= Nas discography =

East Coast hip hop recording artist discography

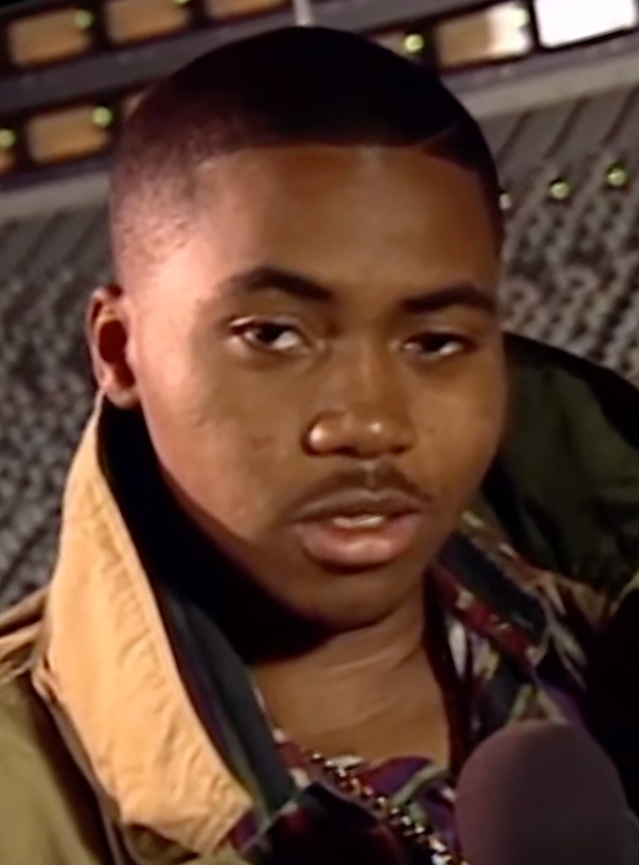
- Nas in 1993
- Studio albums: 17
- Extended plays: 1
- Compilation albums: 5
- Singles: 79
- Music videos: 51
- Collaborative albums: 2
- Mixtapes: 4
- Group albums: 1

The discography of Nas, an American rapper, consists of seventeen studio albums, one collaborative album, one group album, five compilations, four mixtapes, one extended play, and seventy-nine singles (including twelve collaboration singles and thirty-three as a featured artist). Nas has sold over 20 million records in the United States alone, and 35 million albums worldwide.

The son of jazz musician Olu Dara, Nas dropped out of school during ninth grade and began his music career in 1991 with a guest performance on the song "Live at the Barbeque" by Main Source. In 1992, Nas featured on the MC Serch posse cut, “Back to the Grill”, alongside Chubb Rock and Red Hot Lover Tone, and later contributed the track, "Halftime" to the soundtrack to the film Zebrahead. Soon after, Nas signed to Columbia Records, where he released his debut album Illmatic in 1994. Including Nas's solo debut track "Halftime", Illmatic was certified double platinum in the US, spawned several singles including "It Ain't Hard to Tell" and "The World Is Yours", earning considerable critical acclaim.

With a more mainstream-oriented sound, Nas's second album It Was Written was released in 1996 and included the Lauryn Hill collaboration "If I Ruled the World (Imagine That)" and "Street Dreams", the latter of which reached number 22 on the Billboard Hot 100 chart and number 1 on the Hot Rap Singles chart. It Was Written was later certified triple platinum. In 1999, Nas released two albums: I Am... and Nastradamus. I Am reached double platinum status like its preceding album It Was Written and spawned two singles that reached the top ten spots of the Hot Rap Singles chart, "Hate Me Now" and "Nas Is Like". While Nastradamus signaled a decrease in critical reception and sold only half as many units, it still featured two charting singles ("You Owe Me" and the title track), and was eventually certified platinum by the RIAA.

Nas released Stillmatic in 2001, with two singles that once again made the top ten spots of the Billboard rap chart, "Got Ur Self A..." and "One Mic". Nas's 2002 album God's Son included "I Can", his most successful single on the Hot 100 that charted at number 12 there. Nas's 2004 double album Street's Disciple, however, failed to produce any major charting singles. Nas then signed to Def Jam Recordings Def Jam label in 2006 and debuted on Def Jam with Hip Hop Is Dead, his third album to reach number 1 on the American Billboard 200 album chart. In 2008, Nas released an untitled album that he controversially almost titled Nigger. This album, along with its 2012 follow-up Life Is Good, both topped the Billboard 200.

In 2018, Nas released Nasir, an album produced by Kanye West as part of his so-called "Wyoming sessions". The 2020s then saw Nas release the King's Disease trilogy: the first instalment arrived in August 2020, the second arrived in August 2021 and the third was released in November 2022. Also in 2021, Nas surprise released the album Magic on Christmas Eve.

Nas has also participated in three non-solo albums. In 1997, he teamed up with rappers AZ, Cormega, Foxy Brown, and Nature to form supergroup The Firm, whose self-titled album reached the top of the Billboard 200 and included two modestly charting singles "Firm Biz" and "Phone Tap". With his new imprint Ill Will Records, Nas released in 2000 the collaborative compilation Nas & Ill Will Records Presents QB's Finest, which included "Da Bridge 2001" and "Oochie Wally". A few mixtapes were released, as well. In 2010, Nas and reggae singer Damian Marley released the collaborative studio album Distant Relatives. Among the singles in which Nas did guest performances, notable ones including "Hot Boyz" by Missy Elliott (whose remix also featured Lil' Mo, Eve, and Q-Tip), "Did You Ever Think" by R. Kelly, "Thugz Mansion" by 2Pac, "Thank God I Found You (Make It Last Remix)" by Mariah Carey and "I'm Gonna Be Alright" by Jennifer Lopez. Nas has also appeared on singles and tracks by his ex-wife Kelis, Sean "Diddy" Combs, The Game, Ludacris, and Mobb Deep, among others.

== Albums ==
=== Studio albums ===
List of studio albums, with selected chart positions, sales figures and certifications
| Title | Album details | Peak chart positions | | | | | | | | | | Sales | Certifications |
| Title | Album details | US | US R&B/ HH | AUS | CAN | FRA | GER | NLD | NOR | SWI | UK | Sales | Certifications |
|---|---|---|---|---|---|---|---|---|---|---|---|---|---|
| Illmatic | Released: April 19, 1994; Label: Columbia; Format: CD, LP, cassette, digital download | 12 | 2 | — | 52 | 151 | — | 35 | — | — | 57 | US: 1,654,000 (Note: Sales as of 2014.) | RIAA: 2× Platinum; BPI: Platinum; MC: Gold; RMNZ: Platinum |
| It Was Written | Released: July 2, 1996; Label: Columbia; Format: CD, LP, cassette, digital download | 1 | 1 | — | 8 | 7 | 16 | 16 | 10 | 25 | 38 | US: 2,595,000 | RIAA: 3× Platinum; BPI: Gold; MC: Platinum; SNEP: Gold |
| I Am... | Released: April 6, 1999; Label: Columbia; Format: CD, LP, cassette, digital download | 1 | 1 | 77 | 2 | 23 | 16 | 61 | 34 | 38 | 31 | US: 2,178,000 | RIAA: 2× Platinum; BPI: Gold; MC: Platinum |
| Nastradamus | Released: November 23, 1999; Label: Ill Will, Columbia; Format: CD, LP, cassette, digital download | 7 | 2 | — | 27 | — | 45 | 90 | — | 92 | 90 | US: 1,262,000 | RIAA: Platinum; BPI: Silver; MC: Gold |
| Stillmatic | Released: December 18, 2001; Label: Ill Will, Columbia; Format: CD, LP, cassette, digital download | 5 | 1 | 54 | 28 | 124 | 64 | 40 | — | 56 | 92 | US: 2,179,000 | RIAA: Platinum; BPI: Gold; MC: Gold |
| God's Son | Released: December 13, 2002; Label: Ill Will, Columbia; Format: CD, LP, cassette, digital download | 12 | 1 | 57 | 41 | 46 | 89 | 42 | — | 56 | 57 | US: 1,362,000 | RIAA: Platinum; BPI: Gold; MC: Gold |
| Street's Disciple | Released: November 30, 2004; Label: Ill Will, Sony Urban Music, Columbia; Format: CD, LP, cassette, digital download | 5 | 2 | — | — | 54 | — | 82 | 40 | 27 | 45 | US: 724,000 | RIAA: Platinum; BPI: Silver |
| Hip Hop Is Dead | Released: December 19, 2006; Label: The Jones Experience, Def Jam, Columbia; Format: CD, LP, cassette, digital download | 1 | 1 | 50 | 16 | 89 | — | 95 | — | 22 | 68 | US: 785,000 | RIAA: Gold; BPI: Silver |
| Untitled | Released: July 15, 2008; Label: The Jones Experience, Def Jam, Columbia; Format: CD, LP, cassette, digital download | 1 | 1 | 55 | 5 | 45 | — | — | 31 | 10 | 23 | US: 480,000 | RIAA: Gold |
| Life Is Good | Released: July 17, 2012; Label: The Jones Experience, Def Jam; Format: CD, LP, cassette, digital download | 1 | 1 | 27 | 2 | 33 | 24 | 27 | 16 | 8 | 8 | US: 380,000 | RIAA: Gold |
| Nasir | Released: June 15, 2018; Label: Mass Appeal, Def Jam; Format: CD, LP, cassette, digital download | 5 | 4 | 54 | 8 | — | 59 | 13 | 16 | 12 | 16 | | |
| King's Disease | Released: August 21, 2020; Label: Mass Appeal; Format: CD, LP, cassette, digital download | 5 | 3 | 58 | 12 | — | — | 52 | — | 16 | 24 | US: 47,000 | |
| King's Disease II | Released: August 6, 2021; Label: Mass Appeal; Format: CD, LP, cassette, digital download | 3 | 1 | 28 | 9 | — | 52 | 18 | 40 | 6 | 20 | US: 56,000 | |
| Magic | Released: December 24, 2021; Label: Mass Appeal; Format: CD, LP, cassette, digital download | 27 | 11 | — | 58 | — | — | — | — | 34 | — | | |
| King's Disease III | Released: November 11, 2022; Label: Mass Appeal; Format: CD, LP, cassette, digital download | 10 | 4 | — | 29 | — | — | 97 | — | 42 | 48 | | |
| Magic 2 | Released: July 21, 2023; Label: Mass Appeal; Format: CD, LP, cassette, digital download | 52 | 18 | — | — | — | — | — | — | — | — | | |
| Magic 3 | Released: September 14, 2023; Label: Mass Appeal; Format: CD, LP, cassette, digital download | 65 | 26 | — | — | — | — | — | — | — | — (Note: "Magic 3" did not enter the UK Albums Chart but debuted and peaked at number 20 on the UK Album Downloads Chart on 22 September 2023.) | | |
"—" denotes a recording that did not chart or was not released in that territory. * - denotes ineligible Rap Albums Chart position before chart existed in 2004

=== Compilation albums ===
List of compilation albums, with selected chart positions, sales figures and certifications
| Title | Album details | Peak chart positions | | | | | | | Sales | Certifications |
| Title | Album details | US | US R&B/ HH | US Rap | FRA | NLD | SWI | UK | Sales | Certifications |
|---|---|---|---|---|---|---|---|---|---|---|
| Nas & Ill Will Records Presents QB's Finest (with Ill Will Records) | Released: November 21, 2000; Label: Ill Will, Columbia; Format: CD, LP, cassette, digital download | 53 | 10 | — | — | — | — | — | | |
| The Lost Tapes | Released: September 24, 2002; Label: Ill Will, Columbia; Format: CD, LP, cassette, digital download | 10 | 3 | — | 104 | — | 50 | 124 | US: 361,000 | |
| Greatest Hits | Released: November 6, 2007; Label: Columbia; Format: CD, digital download | 124 | 20 | 11 | — | — | — | 150 | US: 25,000 (Note: Sales as of 2008.) | BPI: Gold |
| The Essential Nas | Released: August 20, 2013; Label: Legacy, Columbia; Format: CD, digital download | — | 57 | — | — | — | — | — | | |
| The Lost Tapes 2 | Released: July 19, 2019; Label: Mass Appeal, Def Jam; Format: CD, LP, cassette, digital download | 10 | 7 | 4 | 177 | 95 | 34 | — | US: 12,000 | |
"—" denotes a recording that did not chart or was not released in that territory.

=== Group albums ===
List of group albums, with selected chart positions, sales figures and certifications
| Title | Album details | Peak chart positions | | | | | | Sales | Certifications |
| Title | Album details | US | US R&B/ HH | CAN | FRA | NLD | UK | Sales | Certifications |
|---|---|---|---|---|---|---|---|---|---|
| The Album (by The Firm) | Released: October 21, 1997; Label: Aftermath, Interscope; Format: CD, LP, cassette, digital download | 1 | 1 | 8 | 54 | 51 | 82 | US: 925,000 | MC: Gold |

=== Collaborative albums ===
List of collaborative albums, with selected chart positions, sales figures and certifications
| Title | Album details | Peak chart positions | | | | | | | | | | | Sales | Certifications |
| Title | Album details | US | US R&B/ HH | US Rap | AUS | CAN | FRA | IRE | NLD | NOR | SWI | UK | Sales | Certifications |
|---|---|---|---|---|---|---|---|---|---|---|---|---|---|---|
| Distant Relatives (with Damian Marley) | Released: May 18, 2010; Label: Def Jam, Universal Republic; Format: CD, digital download | 5 | 1 | 1 | 61 | 9 | 27 | 81 | 65 | 32 | 11 | 30 | US: 258,427 (Note: Sales as of 2012.) | BPI: Silver |
| Light-Years (with DJ Premier) | Released: December 12, 2025; Label: Mass Appeal; Format: CD, digital download | 47 | 9 | — | — | — | — | — | — | — | — | — | | |

== Extended plays ==
List of extended plays, with selected chart positions
| Title | EP details | Peak chart positions | |
| Title | EP details | US | US R&B/ HH |
|---|---|---|---|
| From Illmatic to Stillmatic: The Remixes | Released: July 2, 2002; Label: Ill Will, Columbia; Format: CD, LP, digital download | 123 | 32 |

== Mixtapes ==
| Title | Mixtape details |
|---|---|
| Nasty Nas (demo tape) | Released: 1991; Label: Self-released; Format: Cassette |
| The Prophecy, Vol 1 | Released: 2006; Label: Self-released; Format: Digital download |
| The Prophecy, Vol 2: The Beginning of the N | Released: 2006; Label: Self-released; Format: Digital download |
| The Nigger Tape | Released: 2008; Label: Self-released; Format: Digital download |

== DVDs ==
| Title | DVD details |
|---|---|
| Stillmatic DVD | Released: 2002; Label: Self-released; Format: DVD, digital download |
| Made You Look: God's Son Live | Released: 2003; Label: Sony; Format: DVD, digital download |
| Video Anthology Vol. 1 | Released: March 30, 2004; Label: Columbia, Sony; Format: DVD, digital download |

== Singles ==
=== As lead artist ===
List of singles, with selected chart positions and certifications, showing year released and album name
| Title | Year | Peak chart positions | | | | | | | | | | Certifications | Album |
| Title | Year | US | US R&B/ HH | US Rap | AUS | FRA | GER | NLD | NZ | SWI | UK | Certifications | Album |
|---|---|---|---|---|---|---|---|---|---|---|---|---|---|
| "Halftime" (as Nasty Nas) | 1992 | — | — | — | — | — | — | — | — | — | — | | Zebrahead (Soundtrack) /Illmatic |
| "It Ain't Hard to Tell" | 1994 | 91 | 57 | 13 | — | — | — | — | — | — | 64 | | Illmatic |
| "The World Is Yours" | 1994 | — (Note: "The World Is Yours" did not enter the Billboard Hot 100, but peaked at number 14 on the Bubbling Under Hot 100 Singles chart, which acts as an extension to the Hot 100.) | 67 | 27 | — | — | — | — | — | — | — | RIAA: Gold; BPI: Silver; RMNZ: Gold | Illmatic |
| "Life's a Bitch" (featuring AZ and Olu Dara) | 1994 | — | — | — | — | — | — | — | — | — | — | | Illmatic |
| "One Love" (featuring Q-Tip) | 1994 | — | — (Note: "One Love" did not enter the Billboard Hot R&B/Hip-Hop Songs, but peaked at number 6 on the Bubbling Under R&B/Hip-Hop Singles chart, which acts as an extension to the Hot R&B/Hip-Hop Songs.) | 24 | — | — | — | — | — | — | — | | Illmatic |
| "If I Ruled the World (Imagine That)" (featuring Lauryn Hill) | 1996 | 53 | 17 | 15 | 100 | 4 | 4 | 9 | 2 | 7 | 12 | BPI: Gold; RIAA: Platinum; SNEP: Gold; BVMI: Gold; RMNZ: Platinum | It Was Written |
| "Street Dreams" | 1996 | 22 | 18 | 1 | — | — | — | — | 39 | — | 12 | RIAA: Gold | It Was Written |
| "The Message" | 1996 | — | — | — | — | 19 | — | — | — | — | — | RMNZ: Gold | It Was Written |
| "Escobar '97" | 1997 | — | — | — | — | — | — | — | — | — | — | | Men in Black: The Album |
| "In Too Deep" (featuring Nature) | 1999 | — | — | 31 | — | — | — | — | — | — | — | | In Too Deep (Soundtrack) |
| "Nas Is Like" | 1999 | 86 | 30 | 3 | — | — | — | — | — | — | — | | I Am… |
| "Hate Me Now" (featuring Puff Daddy) | 1999 | 62 | 18 | 8 | 55 | — | 11 | 11 | — | 30 | 14 | | I Am… |
| "Nastradamus" | 1999 | 92 | 27 | 4 | — | — | — | 72 | — | — | 24 | | Nastradamus |
| "You Owe Me" (featuring Ginuwine) | 2000 | 59 | 13 | — | — | — | 87 | 100 | — | — | — | | Nastradamus |
| "Rule" (featuring Amerie) | 2001 | — | 67 | — | — | — | — | — | — | — | — | | Stillmatic |
| "Got Ur Self A..." | 2001 | 87 | 37 | 2 | — | — | 62 | 24 | — | 38 | 30 | | Stillmatic |
| "One Mic" | 2002 | 43 | 14 | 7 | — | — | — | 12 | — | — | — | | Stillmatic |
| "Made You Look" | 2002 | 32 | 12 | 9 | — | — | — | — | — | — | 27 | | God's Son |
| "I Can" | 2003 | 12 | 7 | 6 | 43 | 72 | 53 | 46 | — | 43 | 19 | RIAA: Gold | God's Son |
| "Get Down" | 2003 | — | 76 | — | — | — | — | — | — | — | 108 | BPI: Silver; RMNZ: Gold | God's Son |
| "Thief's Theme" | 2004 | — (Note: "Thief's Theme" did not enter the Billboard Hot 100, but peaked at number 19 on the Bubbling Under Hot 100 Singles chart, which acts as an extension to the Hot 100.) | 60 | — | — | — | — | — | — | — | — | | Street's Disciple |
| "Bridging the Gap" (featuring Olu Dara) | 2004 | 94 | 49 | — | — | — | — | — | — | — | 18 | | Street's Disciple |
| "Just a Moment" (featuring Quan) | 2005 | — (Note: "Just a Moment" did not enter the Billboard Hot 100, but peaked at number 17 on the Bubbling Under Hot 100 Singles chart, which acts as an extension to the Hot 100.) | 52 | 24 | — | — | — | — | — | — | — | | Street's Disciple |
| "Hip Hop Is Dead" (featuring will.i.am) | 2006 | 41 | 48 | 25 | 84 | — | 84 | — | 28 | — | 35 | | Hip Hop Is Dead |
| "Can't Forget About You" (featuring Chrisette Michele) | 2007 | — | 46 | — | — | — | — | — | — | — | — | | Hip Hop Is Dead |
| "Surviving the Times" | 2007 | — | — | — | — | — | — | — | — | — | — | | Greatest Hits |
| "Hero" (featuring Keri Hilson) | 2008 | 97 | 82 | — | — | — | — | — | — | 70 | 70 | | Untitled album (Nigger) |
| "Make the World Go Round" (featuring The Game and Chris Brown) | 2008 | — | — (Note: "Make the World Go Round" did not enter the Billboard Hot R&B/Hip-Hop Songs, but peaked at number 22 on the Bubbling Under R&B/Hip-Hop Singles chart, which acts as an extension to the Hot R&B/Hip-Hop Songs.) | — | — | — | — | — | — | — | — | | Untitled album (Nigger) |
| "Nasty" | 2011 | — (Note: "Nasty" did not enter the Billboard Hot 100, but peaked at number 1 on the Bubbling Under Hot 100 Singles chart, which acts as an extension to the Hot 100.) | — | — | — | — | — | — | — | — | — | | Life Is Good |
| "The Don" | 2012 | — | — | — | — | — | — | — | — | — | 158 | | Life Is Good |
| "Daughters" | 2012 | — | 78 | — | — | — | — | — | — | — | — | | Life Is Good |
| "Cherry Wine" (featuring Amy Winehouse) | 2012 | — | — | — | — | — | — | — | — | — | 144 | | Life Is Good |
| "Cops Shot the Kid" (featuring Kanye West) | 2018 | 96 | 49 | — | — | — | — | — | — | — | 97 | | Nasir |
| "Ultra Black" (featuring Hit-Boy) | 2020 | — | — | — | — | — | — | — | — | — | — | | King's Disease |
| "Rare" | 2021 | 100 | 39 | | | | | | 27 | | | | King's Disease II |
| "Life Is Like a Dice Game" (featuring Cordae and Freddie Gibbs) | 2021 | — | — | — | — | — | — | — | — (Note: "Life Is Like a Dice Game" did not enter the NZ Top 40 Singles Chart, but peaked at number 40 on the NZ Hot Singles Chart.) | — | — | | Non-album singles |
| "Tomorrow" (with John Legend and Florian Picasso) | 2022 | — | — | — | — | — | — | — | — | — | — | | Non-album singles |
| "One Mic, One Gun" (with 21 Savage) | 2022 | — | — | — | — | — | — | — | — | — | — | | Magic 2 |
| "Meet Joe Black" | 2022 | — | — | — | — | — | — | — | — | — | — | | Magic |
"—" denotes a recording that did not chart or was not released in that territory.

=== Collaboration singles ===
List of singles, with selected chart positions, showing year released and album name
| Title | Year | Peak chart positions | | | | | | Album |
| Title | Year | US | US R&B/ HH | US Rap | GER | NLD | UK | Album |
|---|---|---|---|---|---|---|---|---|
| "East Coast West Coast Killas" (with RBX, KRS-One and B-Real) | 1996 | — | — | — | — | — | — | Dr. Dre Presents the Aftermath |
| "Firm Biz" (Note: "Firm Biz" did not make the main singles charts, but it reached #35 on Billboard's R&B/Hip-Hop Airplay chart.) (with The Firm featuring Dawn Robinson) | 1997 | — | — | — | — | — | — | The Firm: The Album |
| "Phone Tap" (with The Firm) | 1997 | — | — | — | — | — | — | The Firm: The Album |
| "I've Got to Have It" (with Jermaine Dupri featuring Monica) | 2000 | — | 67 | 15 | 76 | — | — | Big Momma's House (soundtrack) |
| "Da Bridge 2001" (with Capone, Cormega, Marley Marl, MC Shan, Millennium Thug, Mobb Deep, Nature, and Tragedy Khadafi) | 2000 | — | 96 | 17 | — | — | — | Nas & Ill Will Records Presents QB's Finest |
| "Oochie Wally" (with Bravehearts) | 2001 | 26 | 11 | 2 | — | 11 | 30 | Nas & Ill Will Records Presents QB's Finest |
| "What's Going On" (with Artists Against AIDS Worldwide) | 2001 | — | 76 | — | — | — | — | What's Going On: All-Star Tribute |
| "Classic (Better Than I've Ever Been)" (with Kanye West, KRS-One, and Rakim) | 2007 | — | — | — | — | — | — | Non-album single |
| "As We Enter" (with Damian Marley) | 2010 | — (Note: "As We Enter" did not enter the Billboard Hot 100, but peaked at number 16 on the Bubbling Under Hot 100 Singles chart, which acts as an extension to the Hot 100.) | — | — | — | — | 39 | Distant Relatives |
| "Strong Will Continue" (with Damian Marley) | 2010 | — | — | — | — | — | — | Distant Relatives |
| "My Generation" (with Damian Marley featuring Joss Stone and Lil Wayne) | 2010 | — | — | — | — | — | — | Distant Relatives |
| "Define My Name" (with DJ Premier) | 2024 | — | — | — | — | — | — | Non-album singles |
| "Scar Tissue" (with Ghostface Killah) | 2024 | — | — | — | — | — | — | Set the Tone (Guns & Roses) |
"—" denotes a recording that did not chart or was not released in that territory.

=== As featured artist ===
List of singles, with selected chart positions and certifications, showing year released and album name
| Title | Year | Peak chart positions | | | | | Certifications | Album |
| Title | Year | US | US R&B/ HH | US Rap | AUS | UK | Certifications | Album |
|---|---|---|---|---|---|---|---|---|
| "Fast Life" (Kool G Rap featuring Nas) | 1995 | 74 | 42 | 7 | — | — | | 4,5,6 |
| "Gimme Yours" (AZ featuring Nas) | 1995 | — (Note: "Gimme Yours" did not enter the Billboard Hot 100, but peaked at number 15 on the Bubbling Under Hot 100 Singles chart, which acts as an extension to the Hot 100.) | 50 | 17 | — | — | | Doe or Die |
| "Head over Heels" (Allure featuring Nas) | 1997 | 35 | 17 | — | — | 18 | | Allure |
| "Love Is All We Need" (Mary J. Blige featuring Nas) | 1997 | 28 | 2 | — | — | 15 | | Share My World |
| "Grand Finale" (DMX featuring Ja Rule, Method Man and Nas) | 1998 | — (Note: "Grand Finale" did not enter the Billboard Hot 100, but peaked at number 17 on the Bubbling Under Hot 100 Singles chart, which acts as an extension to the Hot 100.) | 63 | 18 | — | — | | Belly (soundtrack) |
| "Hot Boyz" (Missy Elliott featuring Lil' Mo, Nas, Eve and Q-Tip) | 1999 | 5 | 1 | 1 | — | 18 | RIAA: Platinum | Da Real World |
| "Did You Ever Think" (R. Kelly featuring Nas) | 1999 | 27 | 2 | — | — | 20 | | R. |
| "It's Mine" (Mobb Deep featuring Nas) | 1999 | — | 71 | 25 | — | — | | Murda Muzik |
| "Sincerity" (Mary J. Blige featuring DMX and Nas) | 1999 | — | 72 | — | — | — | | Mary |
| "The Ultimate High" (Nature featuring Nas) | 2000 | — | — (Note: "The Ultimate High" did not enter the Billboard Hot R&B/Hip-Hop Songs, but peaked at number 18 on the Bubbling Under R&B/Hip-Hop Singles chart, which acts as an extension to the Hot R&B/Hip-Hop Songs.) | 20 | — | — | | For All Seasons |
| "Thank God I Found You (Make It Last Remix)" (Mariah Carey and Joe featuring Nas) | 2000 | — | — | — | — | — | RIAA: Gold | My Name Is Joe |
| "I'm Gonna Be Alright" (Track Masters Remix) (Jennifer Lopez featuring Nas) | 2002 | 10 | 32 | — | 16 | 3 | ARIA: Gold; BPI: Silver | J to tha L–O! The Remixes |
| "I Got It 2" (Jagged Edge featuring Nas) | 2002 | — (Note: "I Got It 2" did not enter the Billboard Hot 100, but peaked at number 3 on the Bubbling Under Hot 100 Singles chart, which acts as an extension to the Hot 100.) | 34 | — | — | — | | Jagged Little Thrill |
| "Thugz Mansion" (2Pac featuring Nas and J. Phoenix) | 2002 | 19 | 10 | 4 | 26 | 24 | RMNZ: Platinum | Better Dayz |
| "Quick to Back Down" (Bravehearts featuring Nas and Lil Jon) | 2003 | — | 48 | — | — | — | | Bravehearted |
| "In Public" (Kelis featuring Nas) | 2005 | — | — | — | — | 17 | | Tasty |
| "Blackout" (Mashonda featuring Nas) | 2005 | — | 34 | — | — | — | | January Joy |
| "Road to Zion" (Damian Marley featuring Nas) | 2006 | — | 57 | — | — | — | RMNZ: Gold | Welcome to Jamrock |
| "Blindfold Me" (Kelis featuring Nas) | 2006 | — | 91 | — | — | — | | Kelis Was Here |
| "My President" (Young Jeezy featuring Nas) | 2008 | 53 | 45 | 13 | — | — | RIAA: Platinum | The Recession |
| "Too Many Rappers" (Beastie Boys featuring Nas) | 2009 | 93 | — | — | — | 134 | | Hot Sauce Committee Part Two |
| "Fall in Love" (Estelle featuring John Legend and Nas) | 2010 | — | 71 | — | — | — | | All of Me |
| "Ghetto Dreams" (Common featuring Nas) | 2011 | — | — | — | — | — | | The Dreamer/The Believer |
| "So Fresh" (CJ Hilton featuring Nas) | 2011 | — | 50 | — | — | — | | Cold Summer EP |
| "Blame" (K'La featuring Nas) | 2012 | — | 92 | — | — | — | | Non-album single |
| "Hard to Love Somebody" (Arlissa featuring Nas) | 2012 | — | — | — | — | — | | Non-album single |
| "I Am Somebody" (Bliss n Eso featuring Nas) | 2013 | — | — | — | 80 | — | ARIA: Gold | Circus in the Sky |
| "Free" (Rudimental featuring Emeli Sandé and Nas) | 2013 | — | — | — | 5 | 26 | ARIA: 4× Platinum; BPI: Silver; RMNZ: Platinum | Home |
| "Hustle" (Rocko featuring Nas and Antozzio) | 2014 | — | — | — | — | — | | Non-album single |
| "Something to Believe In" (Fashawn featuring Nas and Aloe Blacc) | 2015 | — | — | — | — | — | | The Ecology |
| "Chains" (Usher featuring Nas and Bibi Bourelly) | 2015 | — | — | — | — | — | | Non-album single |
| "The Sickness" (J Dilla featuring Nas) | 2016 | — | — | — | — | — | | The Diary |
| "Figure It Out" (French Montana featuring Nas and Kanye West) | 2016 | — | — (Note: "Figure It Out" did not enter the Billboard Hot R&B/Hip-Hop Songs, but peaked at number 4 on the Bubbling Under R&B/Hip-Hop Singles chart, which acts as an extension to the Hot R&B/Hip-Hop Songs.) | — | — | — | | MC4 |
| "Deep" (Robin Thicke featuring Nas) | 2016 | — | — | — | — | — | | Non-album single |
| "Nas Album Done" (DJ Khaled featuring Nas) | 2016 | — | — | — | — | — | | Major Key |
| "Back 2 HipHop" (Black Eyed Peas featuring Nas) | 2018 | — | — | — | — | — | | Masters of the Sun Vol. 1 |
| "Thriving" (Mary J. Blige featuring Nas) | 2019 | — | — | — | — | — | | Non-album single |
| "NY Se Mumbai" (with Naezy, DIVINE, Ranveer Singh) | 2019 | — | — | — | — | — | | Non-album single |
| "Rodeo" (Lil Nas X featuring Nas) | 2020 | 74 | — | — | — | — | | 7 |
| "Fight the Power: Remix 2020" (Public Enemy featuring Black Thought, Questlove, Rapsody, Jahi, YG and Nas) | 2020 | — | — | — | — | — | | What You Gonna Do When the Grid Goes Down? |
| "Die for It" (Belly and the Weeknd featuring Nas) | 2021 | — (Note: "Die for It" did not enter the Billboard Hot 100, but peaked at number 21 on the Bubbling Under Hot 100 Singles chart, which acts as an extension to the Hot 100.) | — | — | — | — | | See You Next Wednesday |
"—" denotes a recording that did not chart or was not released in that territory.

== Other charted or certified songs ==
List of songs, with selected chart positions, showing year released and album name
| Title | Year | Peak chart positions | | | | | Certifications | Album |
| Title | Year | US | US R&B/ HH | CAN | NZ Hot | UK | Certifications | Album |
|---|---|---|---|---|---|---|---|---|
| "N.Y. State of Mind" | 1994 | — | — | — | — | — | RIAA: Gold; BPI: Gold; RMNZ: Platinum | Illmatic |
| "Affirmative Action" (featuring AZ, Cormega and Foxy Brown) | 1996 | — | 78 | — | — | — | | It Was Written |
| "You Won't See Me Tonight" (featuring Aaliyah) | 1999 | — (Note: "You Won't See Me Tonight" did not enter the Billboard Hot 100, but peaked at number 21 on the Bubbling Under Hot 100 Singles chart, which acts as an extension to the Hot 100.) | 44 | — | — | — | | I Am... |
| "K-I-S-S-I-N-G" | 1999 | — | 50 | — | — | — | | I Am... |
| "Ether" | 2001 | — | 50 | — | — | — | | Stillmatic |
| "You're Da Man" | 2002 | — | 76 | — | — | — | | Stillmatic |
| "Heaven" (featuring Jully Black) | 2003 | — | — (Note: "Heaven" did not enter the Billboard Hot R&B/Hip-Hop Songs, but peaked at number 18 on the Bubbling Under R&B/Hip-Hop Singles chart, which acts as an extension to the Hot R&B/Hip-Hop Songs.) | — | — | — | | God's Son |
| "Last Real Nigga Alive" | 2003 | — | — | — | — | — | | God's Son |
| "Nas' Angels...The Flyest" (featuring Pharrell) | 2003 | — | 72 | — | — | — | | Charlie's Angels: Full Throttle soundtrack |
| "You Know My Style" | 2004 | — | 63 | — | — | — | | Street's Disciple |
| "Virgo" (with Ludacris, featuring Doug E. Fresh) | 2004 | — | 69 | — | — | — | | The Red Light District and Street's Disciple |
| "Where Y'all At" | 2006 | — | — (Note: "Where Y'all At" did not enter the Billboard Hot R&B/Hip-Hop Songs, but peaked at number 18 on the Bubbling Under R&B/Hip-Hop Singles chart, which acts as an extension to the Hot R&B/Hip-Hop Songs.) | — | — | — | | Hip Hop Is Dead |
| "Black Republican" (featuring Jay-Z) | 2006 | — (Note: "Black Republican" did not enter the Billboard Hot 100, but peaked at number 24 on the Bubbling Under Hot 100 Singles chart, which acts as an extension to the Hot 100.) | — (Note: "Black Republican" did not enter the Billboard Hot R&B/Hip-Hop Songs, but peaked at number 2 on the Bubbling Under R&B/Hip-Hop Singles chart, which acts as an extension to the Hot R&B/Hip-Hop Songs.) | — | — | — | | Hip Hop Is Dead |
| "I Do It for Hip Hop" (Ludacris featuring Nas and Jay-Z) | 2008 | — | 89 | — | — | — | | Theater of the Mind |
| "Patience" (with Damian Marley) | 2010 | — | — | — | — | — | RMNZ: Gold | Distant Relatives |
| "Outro" (Lil Wayne featuring Bun B, Nas, Shyne and Busta Rhymes) | 2011 | — (Note: "Outro" did not enter the Billboard Hot 100, but peaked at number 3 on the Bubbling Under Hot 100 Singles chart, which acts as an extension to the Hot 100.) | — | — | — | — | | Tha Carter IV |
| "Summer On Smash" (featuring Swizz Beatz and Miguel) | 2012 | — (Note: "Summer On Smash" did not enter the Billboard Hot 100, but peaked at number 20 on the Bubbling Under Hot 100 Singles chart, which acts as an extension to the Hot 100.) | — | — | — | — | | Life Is Good |
| "Maybach Curtains" (Meek Mill featuring Nas, John Legend and Rick Ross) | 2012 | — | 82 | — | — | — | | Dreams and Nightmares |
| "We Are" (Justin Bieber featuring Nas) | 2015 | 88 | — | 69 | — | 74 | | Purpose |
| "Nas Album Done" (DJ Khaled featuring Nas) | 2016 | — | — (Note: "Nas Album Done" did not enter the Hot R&B/Hip-Hop Songs chart, but peaked at number one on the Bubbling Under R&B/Hip-Hop Singles chart.) | — | — | — | | Major Key |
| "It's Secured" (DJ Khaled featuring Nas and Travis Scott) | 2017 | — (Note: "It's Secured" did not chart on the Billboard Hot 100 chart but did peak at number 22 on the Bubbling Under Hot 100 Singles chart.) | — (Note: "It's Secured" did not enter the Hot R&B/Hip-Hop Songs chart, but peaked at number seven on the Bubbling Under R&B/Hip-Hop Singles chart.) | — | — | — | | Grateful |
| "Adam and Eve" (featuring The-Dream) | 2018 | — (Note: "Adam and Eve" did not enter the Billboard Hot 100, but peaked at number 18 on the Bubbling Under Hot 100 Singles chart.) | — | — | — | — | | Nasir |
| "Not for Radio" (featuring Puff Daddy and 070 Shake) | 2018 | — (Note: "Not for Radio" did not enter the Billboard Hot 100, but peaked at number five on the Bubbling Under Hot 100 Singles chart.) | — | — | — | — | | Nasir |
| "10k Hours" (Jhené Aiko featuring Nas) | 2020 | — (Note: "10k Hours" did not enter the Billboard Hot 100, but peaked at number 13 on the Bubbling Under Hot 100 Singles chart.) | — | — | — | — | | Chilombo |
| "Spicy" (featuring Fivio Foreign and ASAP Ferg) | 2020 | 96 | 36 | — | — | — | | King's Disease |
| "Sorry Not Sorry" (DJ Khaled featuring Nas, Jay-Z and James Fauntleroy) | 2021 | 30 | 13 | 65 | — | 80 | | Khaled Khaled |
| "EPMD 2" (featuring Eminem and EPMD) | 2021 | 79 | 27 | 81 | 20 | — | | King's Disease II |
| "Rare" | 2021 | 100 | 39 | 100 | 27 | — | | King's Disease II |
| "YKTV" (featuring A Boogie wit da Hoodie and YG) | 2021 | — (Note: "YKTV" did not enter the Billboard Hot 100, but peaked at number 22 on the Bubbling Under Hot 100 chart.) | — | — | — | — | | King's Disease II |
| "Nobody" (featuring Ms. Lauryn Hill) | 2021 | — (Note: "Nobody" did not enter the Billboard Hot 100, but peaked at number two on the Bubbling Under Hot 100 chart.) | 42 | — | 33 | — | | King's Disease II |
| "Speechless" | 2022 | — | — | — | 31 | — | | Magic |
| "Wave Gods" (with ASAP Rocky and DJ Premier) | 2022 | — | — | — | 21 | — | | Magic |
| "Thun" | 2022 | — | — | — | 42 | — | | Kings Disease III |
| "Get Light" | 2022 | — | — | — | 51 | — | | Kings Disease III |
"—" denotes a recording that did not chart.

== Guest appearances ==
List of non-single guest appearances, with other performing artists, showing year released and album name
| Title | Year | Other performer(s) | Album |
|---|---|---|---|
| "Live at the Barbeque" (as Nasty Nas) | 1991 | Main Source, Akinyele, Joe Fatal | Breaking Atoms |
| "Back to the Grill" (as Nasty Nas) | 1992 | MC Serch, Chubb Rock, Red Hot Lover Tone | Return of the Product |
| "One on One" | 1994 | —N/a | Street Fighter (soundtrack) |
| "Eye for a Eye (Your Beef is Mines)" | 1995 | Mobb Deep, Raekwon | The Infamous |
| "Verbal Intercourse" | 1995 | Raekwon, Ghostface Killah | Only Built 4 Cuban Linx... |
| "Mo Money, Mo Murder Homicide" | 1995 | AZ | Doe or Die |
| "Affirmative Action" (Saint-Denis Style Remix) | 1995 | Suprême NTM | Paris sous les bombes |
| "One Plus One" | 1996 | Large Professor | The LP |
| "Give It Up Fast" | 1996 | Mobb Deep, Big Noyd | Hell on Earth |
| "No Love Lost" | 1996 | Shaquille O'Neal, Jay-Z, Lord Tariq | You Can't Stop the Reign |
| "The Prophecy" | 1997 | Daddy Yankee | Boricua Guerrero – First Combat |
| "How Ya Livin'" | 1998 | AZ | Pieces of a Man |
| "John Blaze" | 1998 | Fat Joe, Big Pun, Jadakiss, Raekwon | Don Cartagena |
| "Body in the Trunk" | 1998 | Noreaga | N.O.R.E. |
| "Turn It Out (Intro)" | 1998 | Jermaine Dupri | Life in 1472 |
| "Soundtrack to the Streets" | 1998 | Kid Capri | Soundtrack to the Streets |
| "Money Makes the World Go Round" | 1998 | R. Kelly | R. |
| "To My" | 1998 | Timbaland, Mad Skillz, Static Major | Tim's Bio: Life from da Bassment |
| "Queensfinest" | 1998 | DJ Clue? | The Professional |
| "Blood Money (Part 2)" | 1998 | Noreaga, Nature | Ride (soundtrack) |
| "Where Do We Go from Here" | 1999 | Master P, Mac | Only God Can Judge Me |
| "Me & Nas Bring It to Your Hardest" | 1999 | Slick Rick | The Art of Storytelling |
| "You Made Me" | 1999 | Harlem World, Carl Thomas | The Movement |
| "Want It" | 1999 | E-Moneybags, Horse | In E-Moneybags We Trust |
| "Thugs Calm Down" | 1999 | E-Moneybags, Noreaga | In E-Moneybags We Trust |
| "M.O.M.M.Y." | 1999 | Cha Cha | Dear Diary |
| "Journey Through the Life" | 1999 | Puff Daddy, Lil' Kim, Joe Hooker, Beanie Sigel | Forever |
| "Millennium Thug" | 1999 | Funkmaster Flex, Big Kap | The Tunnel |
| "I Really Want to Show You" | 1999 | The Notorious B.I.G., K-Ci & JoJo | Born Again |
| "I Still Got to Have It" | 2000 | Jermaine Dupri | Big Momma's House (soundtrack) |
| "What You Gonna Do" | 2000 | Bravehearts | Baller Blockin' (soundtrack) |
| "B EZ" | 2000 | Capone-N-Noreaga | The Reunion |
| "Let My Niggas Live" | 2000 | Wu-Tang Clan | The W |
| "I Can't Take It No More" (No More Remix) | 2000 | 3LW | 3LW |
| "Live from the Bridge" | 2001 | DJ Clue? | The Professional 2 |
| "Gangsta Tears" | 2001 | —N/a | Exit Wounds (soundtrack) |
| "Queens Day" | 2001 | Run–D.M.C., Prodigy | Crown Royal |
| "Finer Things" | 2001 | Jon B. | Pleasures U Like |
| "Show Discipline" | 2001 | Jadakiss | Kiss tha Game Goodbye |
| "Let Em Hang" | 2001 | Lakey the Kid, V12 | Lake Entertainment Presents: The 41st Side |
| "Good Life" | 2001 | Nate Dogg, 54th Platoon | The Good Life |
| "Some of 'Em" | 2002 | Devin the Dude, Xzibit | Just Tryin' ta Live |
| "Who U Rep With" | 2002 | 50 Cent, Bravehearts | Guess Who's Back? |
| "Too Hot" | 2002 | 50 Cent, Nature | Guess Who's Back? |
| "The Essence" | 2002 | AZ | Aziatic |
| "U Wanna Be Me" | 2002 | —N/a | 8 Mile (Soundtrack) |
| "Stay Chisel" | 2002 | Large Professor | 1st Class |
| "The Pledge" (Remix) | 2002 | Ja Rule, Ashanti | The Last Temptation |
| "Salute Me" (Remix) | 2002 | Fat Joe, Cassidy | Swizz Beatz Presents G.H.E.T.T.O. Stories |
| "In Between Us" | 2002 | Scarface | The Fix |
| "Nas' Angels... The Flyest" | 2003 | —N/a | Charlie's Angels: Full Throttle (Soundtrack) |
| "Play Me" | 2003 | Korn | Take a Look in the Mirror |
| "Too Much for Me" | 2003 | DJ Kay Slay, Birdman, Amerie, Foxy Brown | The Streetsweeper, Vol. 1 |
| "Streets of New York" | 2003 | Alicia Keys, Rakim | The Diary of Alicia Keys (Deluxe) |
| "Tick Tock" | 2004 | The Alchemist, Prodigy | 1st Infantry |
| "Grand Finale" | 2004 | Lil Jon & The East Side Boyz, Bun B, Jadakiss, T.I., Ice Cube | Crunk Juice |
| "Miracle's Boys Theme Song" | 2005 | —N/a | Miracle's Boys (Soundtrack) |
| "Must Be Nice" (Remix) | 2005 | Lyfe Jennings | —N/a |
| "Can't Fade Me" | 2005 | Cassidy, Quan | I'm a Hustla |
| "Material Things" | 2005 | Jully Black | This Is Me |
| "We Major" | 2005 | Kanye West, Really Doe | Late Registration |
| "We March As Millions" | 2005 | —N/a | One Million Strong Vol. 2: Love Peace & War |
| "Living in Pain" | 2005 | The Notorious B.I.G., 2Pac, Mary J. Blige | Duets: The Final Chapter |
| "Escobar 2006" | 2006 | DJ Clue? | Fidel Cashflow 2006: The New Regime |
| "War" | 2006 | DJ Clue? | The Professional, Pt. 3 |
| "Everything I Love" | 2006 | Sean Combs, CeeLo Green | Press Play |
| "Music for Life" | 2006 | Hi-Tek, Common, J Dilla, Marsha Ambrosius, Busta Rhymes | Hi-Teknology²: The Chip |
| "Choir Song" | 2006 | Nashawn | Napalm |
| "Money Machine" | 2006 | Nashawn, Jungle, Ying Yang Twins | Napalm |
| "Level 7" | 2006 | Nashawn | Napalm |
| "Why You Hate the Game" | 2006 | The Game, Marsha Ambrosius | Doctor's Advocate |
| "I Want You" (Remix) | 2007 | Lloyd, André 3000 | Street Love |
| "Get to Know Me" | 2007 | Joe | Ain't Nothin' Like Me |
| "Shake Down" (Remix) | 2007 | Akon, Ali Vegas | —N/a |
| "Gun 4 Gun" | 2007 | Killah Priest | The Offering |
| "Success" | 2007 | Jay-Z | American Gangster |
| "The Real Hiphop" | 2008 | KRS-One | Adventures in Emceein |
| "Ghetto Rich" (Remix) | 2008 | Rich Boy, Lil Wayne, John Legend | —N/a |
| "I Do It for Hip-Hop" | 2008 | Ludacris, Jay-Z | Theater of the Mind |
| "Gangsta Rap Made Me Do It" (Remix) | 2008 | Ice Cube, Scarface | —N/a |
| "I Want In" | 2008 | Bravehearts | Bravehearted 2 |
| "I'm On" | 2008 | DJ Khaled, Cool | We Global |
| "Oh Oh-Yeah-Yea" | 2008 | Keyshia Cole | A Different Me |
| "Don't Touch Me" (Remix) | 2008 | Busta Rhymes, Reek Da Villain, Spliff Star, The Game, Lil Wayne, Big Daddy Kane | —N/a |
| "Letter to the King" | 2008 | The Game | LAX |
| "NYC" | 2008 | Kevin Rudolf | In the City |
| "Game of Love" | 2009 | Nat King Cole | Re: Generations |
| "Usual Suspects" | 2009 | Rick Ross, Kevin Cossom | Deeper Than Rap |
| "What If" | 2009 | Jadakiss | The Last Kiss |
| "Why R You" (Remix) | 2009 | Amerie, Jadakiss, Caine, Rick Ross | —N/a |
| "Yacht Music" | 2009 | DJ Drama, Willie the Kid, Scarface, Marsha Ambrosius | Gangsta Grillz: The Album (Vol. 2) |
| "Victory" | 2010 | DJ Khaled, John Legend | Victory |
| "With Me" | 2010 | Capone-N-Noreaga | The War Report 2: Report the War |
| "Heartbeat" (Remix) | 2010 | Nneka | Concrete Jungle |
| "Street Riders" | 2010 | Game, Akon | Brake Lights |
| "Soldier Survivors" | 2010 | Jadakiss, Sheek Louch | The Champ Is Here 3 |
| "Topless" | 2010 | Dr. Dre, Eminem, T.I. | —N/a |
| "Rich & Black" | 2011 | Raekwon | Shaolin vs. Wu-Tang |
| "It's a Tower Heist" | 2011 | Rick Ross | Tower Heist (soundtrack) |
| "Outro" | 2011 | Lil Wayne, Bun B, Shyne, Busta Rhymes | Tha Carter IV |
| "Get It Forever" | 2011 | Mobb Deep | Black Cocaine |
| "Feel Inside" | 2011 | Mary J. Blige | My Life II... The Journey Continues (Act 1) |
| "Like Smoke" | 2011 | Amy Winehouse | Lioness: Hidden Treasures |
| "Regeneration" | 2012 | DJ Premier, The Berklee Symphony Orchestra | RE:GENERATION Music Project |
| "Triple Beam Dreams" | 2012 | Rick Ross | Rich Forever / God Forgives, I Don't |
| "Nothing to Lose" | 2012 | K'naan | More Beautiful Than Silence / Country, God or the Girl |
| "Kings & Queens" | 2012 | Tyga, Wale | Careless World: Rise of the Last King |
| "Running" | 2012 | Melanie Fiona | The MF Life |
| "Turn Up the Mic (DJ Premier Remix)" | 2012 | Freddie Foxxx | Kolexxxion |
| "Something" | 2012 | Nelly Furtado | The Spirit Indestructible |
| "Chain Glow" | 2012 | Cocaine 80s | —N/a |
| "Champion" | 2012 | Nicki Minaj, Drake, Young Jeezy | Pink Friday: Roman Reloaded |
| "Maybach Curtains" | 2012 | Meek Mill, Rick Ross, John Legend | Dreams and Nightmares |
| "This Thing of Ours" | 2012 | Omarion, Wale, Rick Ross | Self Made Vol. 2 |
| "Mirage" | 2012 | Chris Brown | Fortune |
| "Hip Hop" | 2012 | DJ Khaled, Scarface, DJ Premier | Kiss the Ring |
| "First Chain" | 2013 | Big Sean, Kid Cudi | Hall of Fame |
| "Serious" | 2013 | AZ | Last of a Dying Breed II |
| "BBC" | 2013 | JAY-Z, Justin Timberlake, Timbaland, Pharrell Williams, Beyoncé Knowles, Swizz Beatz, Niigo | Magna Carta... Holy Grail |
| "Too Late" | 2013 | The Alchemist | The Cutting Room Floor 3 |
| "Refuse to Listen" | 2014 | Dwagie | Refuse to Listen |
| "Dedicated" | 2014 | Mariah Carey | Me. I Am Mariah… The Elusive Chanteuse |
| "Troubeaux" | 2014 | Jennifer Lopez | A.K.A. |
| "We Dem Boyz" (Remix) | 2014 | Wiz Khalifa, Rick Ross, Schoolboy Q | Blacc Hollywood |
| "Studio" (Remix) | 2014 | Schoolboy Q, BJ the Chicago Kid | —N/a |
| "Veni Vidi Vici" | 2015 | Madonna | Rebel Heart |
| "Forbes List" | 2015 | Dave East | Hate Me Now |
| "Do What I Do" | 2015 | Scarface, Rick Ross, Z-Ro | Deeply Rooted |
| "God It" | 2015 | De La Soul | —N/a |
| "The Ghetto" | 2015 | The Game, will.i.am | The Documentary 2.5 |
| "We Are" | 2015 | Justin Bieber | Purpose |
| "GOD (Remix)" | 2015 | Young Jeezy | —N/a |
| "Rain" | 2015 | Jadakiss | Top 5 Dead or Alive |
| "One of Us" | 2015 | Rick Ross | Black Market |
| "Friends" | 2015 | Pimp C, Juicy J | Long Live the Pimp |
| "March Madness (Remix)" | 2016 | Future | —N/a |
| "Tell Your Friends (Remix)" | 2016 | The Weeknd | —N/a |
| "Nas Album Done" | 2016 | DJ Khaled | Major Key |
| "This Bitter Land" | 2016 | Erykah Badu | The Land (Music from the Motion Picture) |
| "Rule the World (I Came from the City)" | 2016 | Michael Kiwanuka | The Get Down |
| "Black Man in a White World (Ghetto Gettysburg Address)" | 2016 | Michael Kiwanuka | The Get Down |
| "War" | 2016 | Raye | The Birth of a Nation: The Inspired By Album |
| "Wrote My Way Out" | 2016 | Dave East, Lin-Manuel Miranda, Aloe Blacc | The Hamilton Mixtape |
| "Elevate (Interlude)" | 2016 | Alicia Keys | Here |
| "Die Young" | 2017 | Chris Brown | —N/a |
| "The Hated" | 2017 | Dave East | Paranoia: A True Story |
| "It's Secured" | 2017 | DJ Khaled, Travis Scott | Grateful |
| "Powers That Be" | 2017 | Rick Ross | Rather You Than Me |
| "On the Road Again" | 2017 | Jack White, Lillie Mae, Fats Kaplin, Dominic Davis, Daru Jones | Music from The American Epic Sessions: Original Motion Picture Soundtrack |
| "One Mic" | 2017 | Jack White, Carla Azar, Dominic Davis | Music from The American Epic Sessions: Original Motion Picture Soundtrack |
| "Systematic" | 2017 | DJ Shadow | Silicon Valley (TV series) |
| "NYCHA" | 2018 | Dave East | Rapture (Netflix Original TV Series) EP |
| "Continental" | 2018 | Kollegah | Monument |
| "Check" | 2018 | Mike Will Made It, Rick Ross | Creed II: The Album |
| "Walk Thru" | 2018 | DJ Esco, Future | Kolorblind |
| "Sorry" | 2018 | Nicki Minaj | —N/a |
| "Echo" | 2018 | Swizz Beatz | Poison |
| "Won't Take My Soul" | 2019 | DJ Khaled, CeeLo Green | Father of Asahd |
| "Godfather 4" | 2019 | Dave East | Survival |
| "10k Hours" | 2020 | Jhené Aiko | Chilombo |
| "Birthday Cake" | 2020 | Davido, Hit-Boy | A Better Time |
| "Until I Met You" | 2020 | Alina Baraz | It Was Devine |
| "Keep It Moving" | 2020 | Statik Selektah, Joey Badass, Gary Clark Jr. | The Balancing Act |
| "The Mecca" | 2020 | Ghostface Killah, Styles P, Dave East, Remy Ma, Rahdamusprime | The Forty-Year-Old Version |
| "Walking Miracle" | 2020 | Divine, Cocoa Sarai | Punya Paap |
| "EPMD" | 2021 | Hit-Boy | Judas and the Black Messiah |
| "Sorry Not Sorry" | 2021 | DJ Khaled, Jay-Z, James Fauntleroy | Khaled Khaled |
| "Bath Salts" | 2021 | DMX, Jay-Z | Exodus |
| "Walking in the Rain" | 2021 | DMX, Exodus Simmons, Kon Artis | Exodus |
| "Too Many Goats" | 2021 | Berner, Jadakiss, Rick Ross, Kevin Cossom | Gotti |
| "Conflicted" | 2022 | Snoop Dogg | BODR |
| "Bigger" | 2022 | M.I Abaga, Olamide | The Guy |
| "No Weapon" | 2022 | YG | I Got Issues |
| "Glorious" | 2022 | Cormega | The Realness II |
| "Beat Breaks" | 2022 | DJ Premier | Hip Hop 50: Vol. 1 |
| "Be Like Water" | 2022 | PJ Morton, Stevie Wonder | Watch the Sun |
| "Nas Morales" | 2023 | Metro Boomin | Spider-Man: Across the Spider-Verse (Soundtrack from & Inspired by the Motion Picture) |
| "Candle of the Devil" | 2023 | R-Mean, Scott Storch | MEAN |
| "The Tide" | 2023 | Hit-Boy | Surf or Drown |
| "Runaway" | 2023 | Swizz Beatz | Hip Hop 50: Vol. 2 |
| "Warriors" | 2024 | Lin-Manuel Miranda, Shenseea, Chris Rivers, RZA, Cam'ron, Busta Rhymes, Ghostface Killah | Warriors |
| "Praise Him" | 2024 | LL Cool J | The FORCE |
| "TIMES" | 2025 | Steel Banglez, Sid Sriram | One Day It Will All Make Sense |
| "Documents" | 2025 | Slick Rick | Victory |
| "Let God Sort Em Out/Chandeliers" | 2025 | Clipse | Let God Sort Em Out |
| "The Omerta" | 2025 | Raekwon | The Emperor's New Clothes |
| "Love Me Anymore" | 2025 | Ghostface Killah | Supreme Clientele 2 |
| "Down for You" | 2025 | Mobb Deep, Jorja Smith | Infinite |
| "Pour the Henny" | 2025 | Mobb Deep | Infinite |
| "Love the Way (Down for You Part 2)" | 2025 | Mobb Deep, H.E.R. | Infinite |
| "U Aint Gotta Chance" | 2025 | Big L | Harlem's Finest: Return of the King |
| "Surprise" | 2026 | AZ | Doe or Die III |
| "MARTIN 4SESE" | 2026 | Westside Gunn | Heelmatic |

== Production discography ==
List of production and songwriting credits (excluding guest appearances, interpolations, and samples)
| Track(s) | Year | Credit | Artist(s) | Album |
|---|---|---|---|---|
| 3. "Life's a Bitch"; (featuring AZ) | 1994 | Co-producer (with L.E.S.) | Nas | Illmatic |
| 11. "Real Live Shit" | 1996 | Songwriter | Real Live | The Turnaround: A Long Awaited Drama |
| 15. "Real Live Shit (Remix)"; (featuring Ghostface Killah, Cappadonna, Killa Sin and Lord Tariq) | 1996 | Songwriter | Real Live | The Turnaround: A Long Awaited Drama |
| 5. "Just Cruisin'" | 1997 | Songwriter | Will Smith | Men in Black: The Album |
| 5. "Chasing Forever" | 1997 | Songwriter | Will Smith | Big Willie Style |
| 9. "Yes Yes Y'all"; (featuring Camp Lo) | 1997 | Songwriter | Will Smith | Big Willie Style |
| 9. "Destined to Be" | 1998 | Songwriter | McGruff | Destined to Be |
| 14. "Right Now" | 1998 | Songwriter | Tela | Now or Never |
| 17. "Now or Never (They Wanna Kill Me)" | 1998 | Songwriter | Tela | Now or Never |
| 20. "Money & the Power" | 1998 | Songwriter | Tela | Now or Never |
| 18. "I Wanna Live" | 1998 | Songwriter | Bravehearts | Various artists — Belly (soundtrack) |
| 1. "The Prediction" | 1999 | Producer (with Rich Nice) | Nas | Nastradamus |
| 8. "Nature's Shine" | 2000 | Songwriter | Nature | For All Seasons |
| 3. "We Live This" | 2000 | Songwriter | Big Noyd, Havoc, Roxanne Shanté | Nas & Ill Will Records Presents QB's Finest |
| 4. "Smokin'" | 2001 | Producer (with Precision) | Nas | Stillmatic |
| 7. "One Mic" | 2001 | Producer (with Chucky Thompson) | Nas | Stillmatic |
| 1. "Get Down" | 2002 | Producer (with Salaam Remi) | Nas | God's Son |
| 12. "I Ain't The One"; (featuring WC) | 2002 | Songwriter | Scarface | The Fix |
| 21. "I Know" | 2003 | Songwriter | Ashanti | Chapter II and Johnson Family Vacation |
| D2;1. "Suicide Bounce" | 2004 | Producer | Nas | Street's Disciple |
| D2;3. "U.B.R. (Unauthorized Biography of Rakim)" | 2004 | Producer | Nas | Street's Disciple |
| D2;13. "Thief's Theme" | 2004 | Producer (with Salaam Remi) | Nas | Street's Disciple |
| 8. "The Zenith" | 2012 | Songwriter | Rick Ross, Stalley, Wale | Self Made Vol. 2 |
| 4. "Higher" | 2015 | Songwriter | Fashawn | The Ecology |
| —N/a | 2016 | Executive producer | Various artists | The Get Down (soundtrack) |
| —N/a | 2017 | Executive producer | Dave East | Paranoia: A True Story |
| 8. "Maneuver"; (featuring French Montana) | 2017 | Songwriter | Dave East | Paranoia: A True Story |
| —N/a | 2019 | Executive producer | Various artists | The Get Down: Part II (soundtrack) |
| 1. "Break the Locks" | 2019 | Songwriter | The Get Down Brothers (Jaden Smith, Justice Smith, Shameik Moore, Skylan Brooks, Tremaine Brown Jr.) | The Get Down: Part II (soundtrack) |
| 4. "The Internationale Pt. 1" | 2019 | Songwriter | The Get Down Brothers (Jaden Smith, Justice Smith, Shameik Moore, Skylan Brooks, Tremaine Brown Jr.) | The Get Down: Part II (soundtrack) |
| 14. "Legacy (Outro)" | 2021 | Producer (with Shortfyuz) | Termanology | GOYA III |

== Music videos ==
=== As lead artist ===
List of music videos, with directors, showing year released
| Title | Year | Director(s) |
|---|---|---|
| "Halftime" | 1992 | —N/a |
| "It Ain't Hard to Tell" | 1994 | Ralph McDaniels |
| "The World Is Yours" | 1994 | Josh Taft |
| "The World Is Yours (Q-Tip Remix)" | 1994 | —N/a |
| "One Love" | 1994 | Fab 5 Freddy |
| "If I Ruled the World (Imagine That)" (featuring Lauryn Hill) | 1996 | Hype Williams |
| "Street Dreams" | 1996 | Hype Williams |
| "The Message" | 1996 | —N/a |
| "Firm Biz" (with The Firm featuring Dawn Robinson) | 1997 | Hype Williams |
| "Phone Tap" (with The Firm featuring Dr. Dre) | 1998 | Nick Quested |
| "Nas Is Like" | 1999 | Nick Quested |
| "Hate Me Now" (featuring Puff Daddy) | 1999 | Hype Williams |
| "Nastradamus" | 1999 | Nastradamus |
| "You Owe Me" (featuring Ginuwine) | 2000 | David Meyers |
| "Da Bridge 2001" | 2000 | —N/a |
| "Oochie Wally" (Remix) (featuring The Bravehearts) | 2001 | —N/a |
| "Got Ur'Self A..." | 2001 | Benny Boom |
| "One Mic" | 2002 | Chris Robinson |
| "Made You Look" | 2002 | Benny Boom |
| "I Can" | 2003 | Chris Robinson |
| "Thief's Theme" | 2004 | Ben Mor |
| "Bridging the Gap" (featuring Olu Dara) | 2004 | Diane Martel |
| "Just a Moment" (featuring Quan) | 2005 | Ben Mor |
| "U.B.R." | 2005 | |
| "Hip Hop Is Dead" (featuring will.i.am) | 2006 | Nas, Ulysses Terrero |
| "Shine on 'Em" | 2006 | —N/a |
| "Can't Forget About You" (featuring Chrisette Michelle) | 2007 | Chris Robinson |
| "Hustlers" (featuring The Game) | 2007 | R. Malcolm Jones |
| "Be a Nigger Too" | 2008 | Rik Cordero |
| "Hero" (featuring Keri Hilson) | 2008 | Taj |
| "Make the World Go Round" (featuring The Game and Chris Brown) | 2008 | Chris Robinson |
| "As We Enter" (with Damian Marley) | 2010 | NABIL |
| "Patience" (with Damian Marley) | 2011 | NABIL |
| "Land of Promise" (with Damian Marley) | 2011 | Ras Kassa |
| "Nah Mean" (with Damian Marley) | 2011 | Ras Kassa |
| "Nasty" | 2011 | Jason Goldwatch |
| "The Don" | 2012 | Aristotle |
| "Daughters" | 2012 | Chris Robinson |
| "Bye Baby" | 2012 | Aristotle |
| "Cherry Wine" (featuring Amy Winehouse) | 2012 | Jay Martin |
| "Cops Shot the Kid" | 2018 | Rohan Blair-Mangat |
| "Adam and Eve" | 2018 | Rohan Blair-Mangat |
| "Everything" | 2018 | Rohan Blair-Mangat |
| "No Bad Energy" | 2019 | Vincent Lou |
| "Ultra Black" (featuring Hit-Boy) | 2020 | Spike Jordan |
| "Spicy" (featuring Fivio Foreign and A$AP Ferg) | 2020 | Jack Begert |
| "Replace Me" (featuring Don Toliver and Big Sean) | 2020 | Christian Sutton |
| "27 Summers" | 2021 | Jon J |
| "EPMD" | 2021 | Child |

=== As featured artist ===
List of music videos, with directors, showing year released
| Title | Year | Director(s) |
|---|---|---|
| "Back to the Grill" (MC Serch featuring Nas, Red Hot Lover Tone and Chubb Rock) | 1992 | —N/a |
| "Mo Money, Mo Murder (Homicide)" (AZ featuring Nas) | 1995 | —N/a |
| "Fast Life" (Kool G Rap featuring Nas) | 1995 | —N/a |
| "East Coast/West Coast Killas (Fire Version)" (Group Therapy [Nas, KRS-One, B-Real and RBX]) | 1996 | —N/a |
| "Head Over Heels" (Allure featuring Nas) | 1997 | Diane Martel |
| "Love Is All We Need" (Mary J. Blige featuring Nas) | 1997 | Paul Hunter |
| "Grand Finale" (DMX, Ja Rule, Method Man and Nas) | 1998 | |
| "John Blaze" (Fat Joe featuring Nas, Big Pun, Jadakiss and Raekwon) | 1998 | Chris Robinson |
| "Did You Ever Think" (Remix) (R. Kelly featuring Nas) | 1999 | R. Kelly and Bille Woodruff |
| "It's Mine" (Mobb Deep featuring Nas) | 1999 | |
| "Hot Boyz" (Missy Elliott featuring Eve, Lil' Mo, Q-Tip and Nas) | 1999 | Hype Williams |
| "Thank God I Found You (Make It Last Remix)" (Mariah Carey featuring Joe and Nas) | 2000 | —N/a |
| "I've Got to Have It" (Jermaine Dupri featuring Nas and Monica) | 2000 | —N/a |
| "I'm Gonna Be Alright" (Remix) (Jennifer Lopez featuring Nas) | 2002 | Dave Meyers |
| "I Got It 2" (Jagged Edge featuring Nas) | 2002 | —N/a |
| "The Pledge" (Remix) (Ja Rule featuring Ashanti and Nas) | 2002 | Irv Gotti |
| "Thugz Mansion" (2Pac featuring Nas) | 2002 | David Nelson |
| "Quick to Back Down" (Remix) (Bravehearts featuring Nas and Lil Jon) | 2003 | —N/a |
| "Road to Zion" (Damian Marley featuring Nas) | 2005 | —N/a |
| "Blindfold Me" (Kelis featuring Nas) | 2006 | Marc Klasfeld |
| "My President" (Young Jeezy featuring Nas) | 2009 | Gabriel Hart |
| "Too Many Rappers" (Beastie Boys featuring Nas) | 2009 | Nathanial Hornblower |
| "Fall in Love" (Estelle featuring Nas) | 2010 | —N/a |
| "Rich & Black" (Raekwon featuring Nas) | 2011 | Woodworks |
| "Ghetto Dreams" (Common featuring Nas) | 2011 | Matt Alonzo |
| "Hard to Love Somebody" (Alissa featuring Nas) | 2012 | —N/a |
| "Blame" (K'La featuring Nas) | 2012 | —N/a |
| "I Am Somebody" (Bliss N Eso featuring Nas) | 2014 | Allan Hardy |
| "Refuse to Listen" (Dwagie featuring Nas) | 2014 | —N/a |
| "Chains" (Usher featuring Nas and Bibi Bourelly) | 2015 | Ben Louis Nicholas and Daniel Arsham |
| "The Sickness" (J Dilla featuring Nas) | 2016 | Ruffmercy |
| "Nas Album Done" (DJ Khaled featuring Nas) | 2016 | Eif Rivera, DJ Khaled |
| "Figure It Out" (French Montana featuring Kanye West and Nas) | 2016 | |
| "It's Secured" (DJ Khaled featuring Nas and Travis Scott) | 2017 | Grateful |
| "Back 2 HipHop" (Black Eyed Peas featuring Nas) | 2018 | Pasha Shapiro |
| "Echo" (Swizz Beatz featuring Nas) | 2018 | HOEDOWN & VINCENT LOU FILM |
| "Rodeo" (Lil Nas X featuring Nas) | 2020 | Bradley and Pablo |
| "Fight the Power: Remix 2020" (Public Enemy featuring Black Thought, Questlove, Rapsody, Jahi, YG and Nas) | 2020 | Unknown |
| "Sorry Not Sorry" (DJ Khaled featuring Jay-Z and Nas) | 2021 | Unknown |
| "Die for It" (The Weeknd and Belly featuring Nas) | 2021 | James Larese |
| "The Tide" (Hit-Boy featuring Nas) | 2023 | THIRDEYERAZ |
| "Times" (Steel Banglez featuring Nas and Sid Sriram) | 2025 | Nathan James Tettey |
