= Video Anthology Vol. 1 =

Video by Nas
- Released: March 30, 2004
- Genre: East Coast hip hop
- Length: 61 minutes
- Label: Columbia/Sony

Nas chronology
| Made You Look: God's Son Live (2002) | Video Anthology Vol. 1 (2004) |

Professional ratings
Review scores
| Source | Rating |
|---|---|
| RapReviews.com | 8/10 |

Video Anthology Vol. 1 is an album of Nas' music videos in DVD format. Its songs are presented in a slightly altered chronological order and feature songs from all of his first six albums. It was released when the Illmatic: 10th Anniversary Platinum Edition was released to commemorate the last 10 years of Nas' career. It also features four music videos from Illmatic, a disproportionately higher amount than any other album. Nas provides commentary for all of the videos, except "The World Is Yours".

== Track listing ==
1. "It Ain't Hard To Tell"
  - Director: Ralph McDaniels
2. "One Love"
  - Director: Fab Five Freddy
3. "Halftime"
4. "Nas Is Like"
  - Director: Nick Quested
  - Guest Appearance: DJ Premier and Ron Artest
5. "The World Is Yours"
  - Director: Josh Taft
  - Guest Appearance: Pete Rock
6. "If I Ruled The World (Imagine That)"
  - Director: Hype Williams
  - Guest Appearance: Big Noyd, Cormega, Mobb Deep, Lauryn Hill & Prodigy
7. "Hate Me Now"
  - Director: Hype Williams
  - Guest Appearance: P. Diddy & Jungle
  - Film Editing: Harvey White
8. "Street Dreams"
  - Director: Hype Williams
  - Guest Appearance: Kenya Moore & Frank Vincent
  - Video Production: Martine Capalbo
  - Cinematography: Malik Hassan Sayeed
9. "Nastradamus"
  - Director: Jeffrey W. Byrd
10. "You Owe Me"
  - Director: Dave Meyers
  - Guest Appearance: Ginuwine and Destiny's Child
11. "Got Ur Self A..."
  - Director: Benny Boom
12. "One Mic"
  - Director: Chris Robinson
13. "Made You Look"
  - Director: Benny Boom
  - Guest Appearance: Jadakiss, DJ Kay Slay, Lord Jamar & Fat Joe
14. "I Can"
  - Director: Chris Robinson
