= Level 7 =

Level 7 may refer to:

== Film and television ==
- "Level Seven", episode of Out of the Unknown, 1966 adaptation of the Roshwald novel by J. B. Priestley
- Level Seven, 2008 film by Geraint Wyn Davies

== Music ==
- "Level 7", song by D.R.I. from Full Speed Ahead
- "Level 7", song by Nashawn, from Nas discography, 2008

== Other uses ==
- Level 7 (novel) by Mordecai Roshwald, 1959
- Level 7 nuclear accident, meltdown - Chernobyl or Fukushima
- Level 7 Diploma, master level education without academic dissertation
- Level Seven (hacking group)
