= Jay Shetty =

British influencer (born 1987)

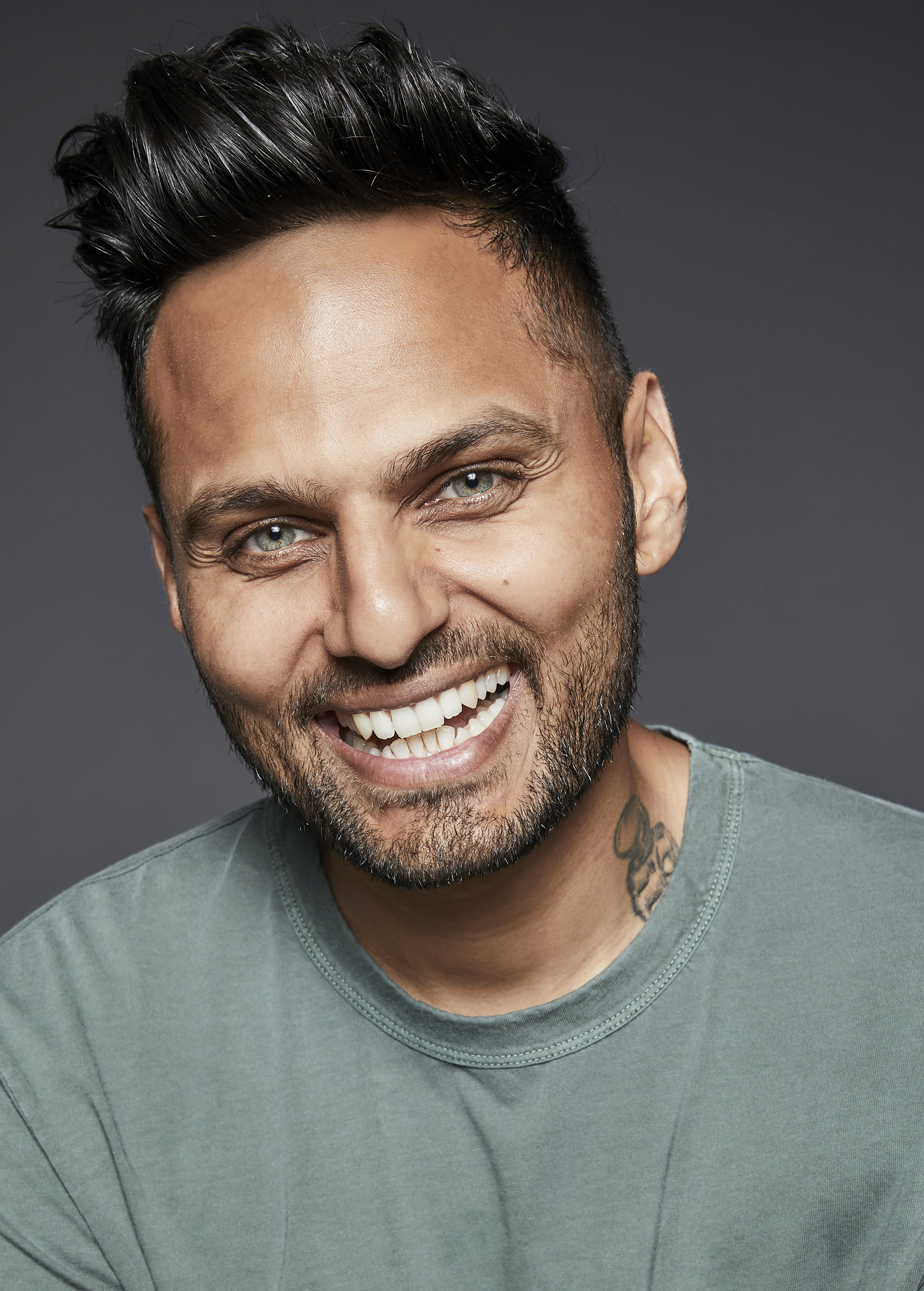
- Shetty in August 2021
- Born: 6 September 1987 (age 39); London, England
- Education: Queen Elizabeth's School
- Alma mater: City, University of London
- Occupations: Podcaster; Internet personality; author
- Years active: 2013–present
- Notable work: Think Like a Monk
- Spouse: Radhi Devlukia
- Awards: 11th Shorty Awards

Jay Shetty (born 6 September 1987) is a British podcaster, author, entrepreneur, and life coach. He has appeared on television programs to informally discuss mental health and life purpose.

== Early life ==
Shetty was born in London on 6 September 1987 to a Hindu family of Indian origin. He was raised in Barnet, North London and has a sister. He says he has been a member of the International Society for Krishna Consciousness, known as the Hare Krishna movement or Hare Krishnas, since childhood. His mother is a Gujarati who was raised in Yemen and his father is a Tulu Bunt from Mangalore.

He attended Queen Elizabeth's School, Barnet, then graduated from the Bayes Business School at the City St George's, University of London in 2010 with a degree in Management science.

== Career ==
In a 2008 interview, Shetty claims that at a 2006 event in France of the Iskcon Pandava Sena (the Hare Krishna youth group) he had undergone a "massive transformation" and become appreciative of the Hare Krishna movement.

In business school around 2007 (though Shetty had provided inconsistent accounts of when the event took place), Shetty claimed to have met Gauranga Das, a monk invited to speak at the school on selflessness and living a minimalist lifestyle. Shetty claimed to have spoken with Gauranga after his talk and followed him for the remainder of Gauranga's lecture circuit around the United Kingdom.

Shetty claims to have then spent four summers in India interning at corporations and training with the International Society for Krishna Consciousness (ISKCON). Shetty has often claimed that he spent three years, from 2010 to 2013, living the ISKCON lifestyle at an undisclosed ashram in Mumbai, India. Despite this claim, his blog posts and people familiar with his movements during that period indicate he actually spent a majority of this time making promotional videos at Bhaktivedanta Manor in Watford, England, with Shetty writing in a blog post that he had arrived in India in October 2010 and had spent less than four months in the country before leaving again.

Shetty began his career at Accenture, working on digital strategy and as a social media coach for the company's executives. In 2016, Shetty broke away to become an independent content creator. His work caught the attention of Arianna Huffington, who hired him to produce videos for Huffington Post about topics such as relationships. Shetty stopped working for the HuffPost in early 2017, later releasing videos independently on Facebook and YouTube. By 2019, Shetty had over 1 million subscribers on YouTube and 20 million followers on Facebook.

In 2018, Shetty appeared on The Ellen DeGeneres Show and the Red Table Talk show (hosted by Jada Pinkett Smith) on Facebook, and became the "personal spiritual adviser" to Will Smith.

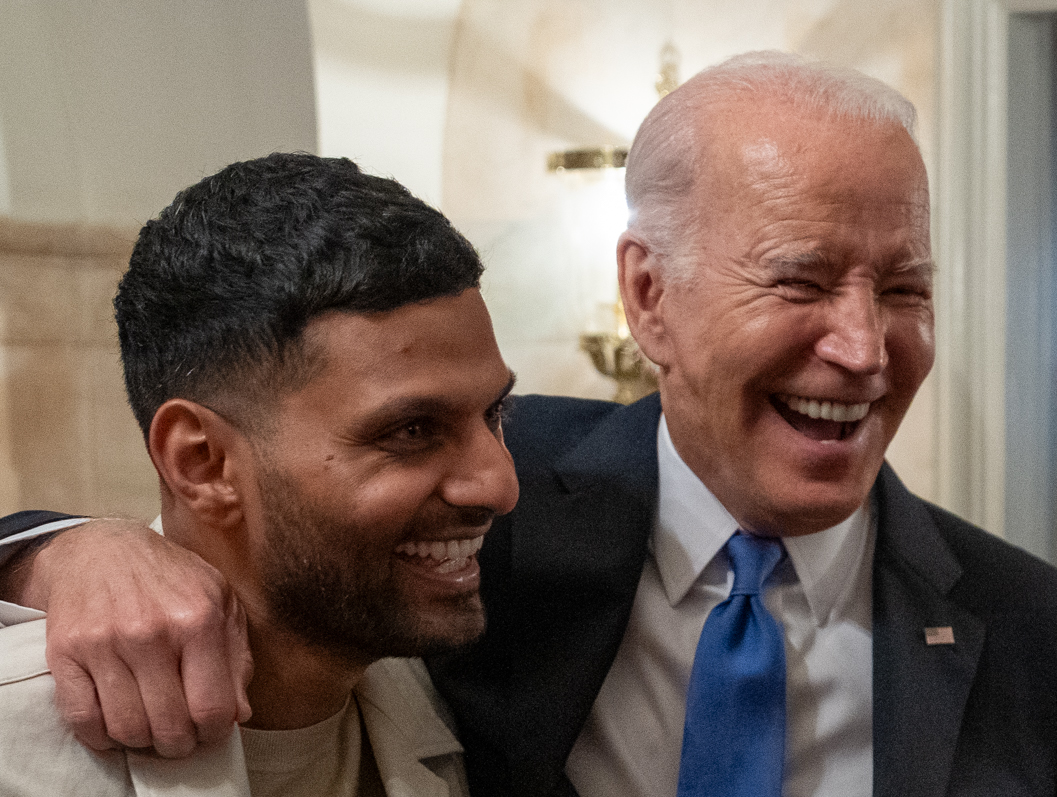
President Joe Biden with Jay Shetty on 26 July 2023, in the White House

In 2019, Shetty launched the podcast On Purpose. The podcast was downloaded 64 million times in its first year. On Purpose became the number one health podcast in the world according to Forbes. In July 2023, Shetty interviewed US President Joe Biden on his mental health initiatives in a podcast episode filmed at the White House. Shetty has conducted interviews with a number of other public figures.

In August 2019, YouTuber Nicole Arbour criticized Shetty for posting quotes without proper attribution. This led him to add attributions to 113 posts on his Instagram.

Shetty's website previously referred to him holding a degree in "behavioural science", rather than "management science". Shetty's ex-girlfriend, a practicing psychotherapist and head of mental health services at a university in the UK, opined that he misrepresented his knowledge and credentials.

=== Jay Shetty Certification School ===
In 2020, Shetty founded the Jay Shetty Certification School, an online learning platform for becoming an in-house accredited life coach. Shetty's school advertised a Level 7 diploma, billed at $7,400-a-term, claiming the certification was equivalent to a Master's degree in the United Kingdom.

A 2024 investigation by The Guardian found that the school had made several misleading and erroneous claims regarding its status as being regulated by the Office of Qualifications and Examinations Regulation (Ofqual). In response to the investigation, Ofqual stated “Ofqual do not recognise Jay Shetty – the Centre is not linked to any OTHM Ofqual-regulated qualifications,” and made demands that references to Ofqual must be removed from the school website as they "might mislead".

The investigation also found the school claimed to be in progression arrangements with the University of Chichester as well as several other UK universities. During an interview, a spokesperson from the University of Chichester stated “We have never worked with Jay Shetty Certification School" and "I’m very unhappy that we are included on the website. We are unsure why we are being mentioned. We will immediately be making contact to get our name taken off.”

Marketing professor William Keep of The College of New Jersey likened the school's business model to a multi-level marketing scheme, as many students are encouraged to recoup the $7,400-a-term tuition cost by starting their own training centers. Following the investigation, Shetty directed his team to delete a number of posts, and hire a crisis PR firm for a SEO campaign.

=== Other enterprises and roles ===
Shetty is the co-founder of a video production company, Icon Media, along with Alex Kushneir.

In 2021, Shetty and his wife Radhi launched an adaptogenic tea brand, Juni, inspired by Ayurveda.

In 2022, Shetty joined meditation product company Calm.

He is also in the ownership group of Angel City of the National Women's Soccer League.

=== Books ===
Shetty's first book, Think Like a Monk, was published in 2020 by Simon & Schuster. Shetty's second book, 8 Rules of Love: How to Find It, Keep It, and Let It Go was also published by Simon & Schuster. Within a week it became a New York Times best-seller.

=== Recognition ===
In 2012, he was a winner of Accenture UK's 'Superstar Analyst' award, in which he attended a dinner in London's Saville Row with another unknown recipient.

Shetty won a 2016 Asian Media Award for Best Blog and a 2018 Streamy Award.

In April 2019, Shetty was honoured with the Outstanding Achievement Online Award at The Asian Awards and in May 2019 he won Best in Health & Wellness at the 11th Shorty Awards.

In July 2025, Shetty was named in Time magazine's inaugural "TIME100 Creators" list.

== Personal life ==
Shetty lives in Los Angeles with his wife, Radhi Devlukia Shetty. He follows a vegan diet.
