= I Am... (Nas album) =

Studio album by Nas
- Released: April 6, 1999
- Recorded: 1998–1999
- Genre: East Coast hip-hop
- Length: 64:54
- Label: Columbia
- Producers: L.E.S.; DJ Premier; Trackmasters; Timbaland; Alvin West; Dame Grease; Nashiem Myrick; Carlos "Six July" Broady

Nas chronology
The Album (1997)	I Am... (1999)	Nastradamus (1999)

Singles from I Am...
- 1. "Nas Is Like" Released: February 20, 1999; 2. "Hate Me Now" Released: April 6, 1999

I Am... is the third studio album by American rapper Nas, released on April 6, 1999, by Columbia Records. Following the commercial and critical success of 1996's It Was Written, Nas put to work on a double album that merged the styles of his first two albums and detailed entire aspects of his life. Although he was able to use most songs, other songs that would have made I Am... a double album leaked onto the internet in MP3 format, forcing him to record new material for two separate single-disc releases (hence, the release of Nastradamus in the same year). The album features guest appearances from Puff Daddy, Scarface, DMX, and Aaliyah.

The album incorporates a mix of hardcore hip-hop and storytelling, with themes predominantly based on Nas' reflections on fame, the rap industry, urban life in America and his childhood in Queensbridge. I Am... addresses a variety of social issues and personal experiences, offering a deeper look into Nas' life and his perspective on the world around him.

The album debuted at number 1 on the Billboard 200, selling over 470,000 copies in its first week of sales. I Am... would later be certified double platinum in the United States, making it Nas' second best-selling release behind It Was Written. Upon its release, I Am... received generally mixed reviews from critics.

== Background ==
This album was originally to have been a double album titled I Am...The Autobiography. However, most of the original sessions were bootlegged forcing Nas to discard many songs and adjust the release to one disc. I Am...became one of the first major label releases to be widely leaked using MP3 technology. Some of the leaked songs were later released on the compilation LP The Lost Tapes in 2002. The concept of this album as can be seen by tracks such as "Fetus" from The Lost Tapes was to be an autobiography of sorts for Nas. Although several bootleg versions have appeared on the internet over the years, an official version of the intended double album has never leaked and it remains unclear whether or not it was ever completed.

=== 1999 leak tracklisting ===
1. Fetus (Belly Button Window) (later on The Lost Tapes)
2. Small World (later on I Am...)
3. Money Is My Bitch (later on I Am...)
4. Project Windows (later on Nastradamus)
5. Poppa Was a Player (later on The Lost Tapes)
6. Dr. Knockboots (Do's and Don't) (later on I Am...)
7. Day Dreamin' Stay Schemin'
8. Sometimes I Wonder
9. The Hardest Thing to Do Is Stay Alive
10. Drunk by Myself (later on The Lost Tapes)
11. Wanna Play (later on Dame Grease's "Live on Lenox" The Album)
12. Blaze a 50 (later on The Lost Tapes)
13. We Will Survive (later on I Am...)

Other leaked songs include Find Ya Wealth (later on QB's Finest), U Gotta Love It (later on The Lost Tapes), My Worst Enemy, Amongst Kings and The Rise & Fall.

An official two-LP pressing of the "Autobiography" version (utilizing the 1999 leak tracklisting) was released by Columbia/Legacy/Sony for Record Store Day Black Friday on November 24, 2023.

== Music ==
The two singles from I Am... were "Hate Me Now" and "Nas Is Like". "Hate Me Now" features Puff Daddy and is produced by D-Moet, Pretty Boy and The Trackmasters. It was a Billboard Hot 100 hit, and had a controversial music video directed by Hype Williams. The song had a version of the O Fortuna from Carl Orff's "Carmina Burana." "Nas Is Like" is one of two tracks produced by DJ Premier who scratches vocal samples from Nas' "It Ain't Hard to Tell" into the chorus. The "Nas Is Like" music video was directed by Nick Quested and is still very popular in underground circles and continued a long list of popular Nas/DJ Premier collaborations.

The album also contained the song "We Will Survive", a tribute to Tupac Shakur and The Notorious B.I.G. The song criticized his peers, most notably Jay-Z, who "claimed to be New York's king" following B.I.G.'s death, the record has been cited as potentially encouraging the Nas vs. Jay-Z feud.

== Cover art ==
Famed photographer Danny Hastings has shot iconic cover images for Big Pun's Capital Punishment and Raekwon's Only Built 4 Cuban Linx, but his album art shoot for I Am... almost ended in disaster. In order to make the iconic mask featured on the cover, Hastings and his crew put a clay mold on Nas' face and poked air holes so he could breathe, but he almost suffocated after clay got lodged in his nose.

"The funny part was that the first attempt, Nas was getting asphyxiated. We almost killed Nas," Hastings told MTV.com. "We cleaned him up, and he was like, 'Let's do it again!' [...] Nas was a true sport."

He also explained the meaning behind the cover, and how it built off of previous album art for Illmatic and It Was Written. "The first one, you have him being a boy, very young. The second was a little bit older. And the third one, he was a king," he continued. "He already conquered the world. He was on top of the world. He was doing a lot of big things. We came with the concept of making a King Tut sarcophagus piece."

== Critical reception ==
Professional ratings
Review scores
Source	Rating
AllMusic	3/5 stars
Chicago Sun-Times	2.5/4 stars
Entertainment Weekly	B
Los Angeles Times	3/4 stars
NME	8/10
Rolling Stone	3.5/5 stars
The Source	4.5/5 stars
USA Today	4/4 stars
The Village Voice	B−

Yahoo! Music's Billy Johnson Jr. described the album's production as "somber" and described its songs as "thought-provoking, though average quality". Jeff Stark of Salon noted "distinct identities" for each song and wrote that it does not sound "coherent", but "as if it belongs to a scattershot demographic of subway riders". Franklin Soults of The Village Voice viewed that its music attempts to meet "halfway" with consumer demographics, noting that Nas' "most salient talent is finding and exploiting the middle ground". In his consumer guide for The Village Voice, critic Robert Christgau gave I Am... a B− rating and named it "dud of the month", indicating "a bad record whose details rarely merit further thought". Christgau criticized Nas' "ethos" and stated, "The question is how convincing he is, and only two themes ring true: the bad ones, revenge and money. His idea of narrative detail is to drop brand names like Bret Easton Ellis; his idea of morality is everybody dies". Craig Seymour of The Washington Post attributed its thematic inconsistency to the replacement of tracks that leaked to the Internet prior to the album's release, concluding that "Anyone with a good Web connection might wonder what a profound personal opus 'I Am' could have been". Miles Marshall Lewis of LA Weekly viewed that Nas "tightrope[s] the line between order and chaos, gangsterism and enlightenment" on the album, which he found to be "not a horrendous album. But Nas has now established a pattern of declining album quality, and that makes I Am... Nas' worst album".

Chicago Sun-Times writer Rebecca Little gave the album two-a-and-half out of four stars and stated, "if you get past the torrent of [profanity] and a few terms referring to women as dogs and garden tools, [...] 'I Am' is a notable effort", adding that "The finer moments lie in the rapper's trademark ability to spin a compelling tale about ghetto life". Kris Ex of Rolling Stone gave it three-and-a-half out of five stars and stated, "Nas is still a diamond in the rough — perhaps the rawest lyrical talent of his day but lacking the guidance and vision to create a complete album [...] But what I Am... lacks in content, it makes up for in lyrical acumen; the album doesn't deliver the introspection its title implies, but it compensates for it in storytelling and craftsmanship. I Am... offers tantalizing hints of promise tethered by a need for pop acceptance". Christopher John Farley of Time complimented Nas' lyrics and themes and the album's musical approach, noting "grander, more aggressive, more cinematic" songs. Entertainment Weekly's Tom Sinclair compared the album to "a bona fide hip-hopera", noting string and keyboard-laden songs and "universal themes". Los Angeles Times writer Soren Baker commended Nas for "adroitly balancing hard-core subject matter with production that should easily find its way onto urban radio". Steve Jones of USA Today gave it four out of four stars and complimented Nas' "dense and deft rhymes" and "nimble, cinematic descriptions", writing that the album "nestles nicely between the underground grittiness of 1994's Illmatic and the high gloss of 1996's It Was Written". In a rave review for The Source, Carlito Rodriguez wrote that Nas "wears [his crown] proudly, thorns and all", highlighting "Nas Is Like" as the first track since 1994's "It Ain't Hard to Tell" to "give goose bumps at first listen".

In a retrospective review, AllMusic editor M.F. DiBella gave the album three out of five stars and noted "blandness" in its production, writing that "Musically, I Am is somewhat unimaginative by Nas' stratospheric standards. [...] some of these tracks lack the sonic depth to do justice to the prophecies of the pharaoh, Nas". However, DeBella added that Nas "still shines as the old soul storyteller and crime rhyme chronicler" on some tracks and cited "Nas Is Like" and "N.Y. State of Mind, Pt. 2" as highlights, adding that they "are nothing short of Illmatic perfection". Steve Juon of RapReviews gave I Am... an eight-and-a-half out of 10 rating and viewed it as an improvement over It Was Written, praising Nas' "power of description" and "much improved" lyrics. Writing in The New Rolling Stone Album Guide (2004), music journalist Chris Ryan gave the album two-and-a-half out of five stars and wrote that it has "[its] share of solid material, but ultimately fail[s] in the face of Nas' inability to navigate the divide between the street reporting that made him a legend and the commercial hits that made him a star".

== Track listing ==
I Am... track listing
No.	Title	Writer(s)	Producer(s)	Length
1.	"Album Intro"	Nasir Jones		2:50
2.	"N.Y. State of Mind Pt. II"	Jones; Christopher Martin	DJ Premier	3:36
3.	"Hate Me Now" (featuring Puff Daddy)	Jones; Gavin Marchand	Pretty Boy; D. Moet; Trackmasters	4:44
4.	"Small World"	Jones; Carlos Broady; Nashiem Myrick	Nashiem Myrick & Carlos Broady for The Hitmen	4:45
5.	"Favor for a Favor" (featuring Scarface)	Jones; Brad Jordan; Leshan David Lewis	L.E.S.	4:07
6.	"We Will Survive"	Jones; Jamel Edgerten	Trackmasters; Jamel Edgerten	5:00
7.	"Ghetto Prisoners"	Jones; Damon Blackmon	Dame Grease	4:00
8.	"You Won't See Me Tonight" (featuring Aaliyah)	Jones; Timothy Mosley; Missy Elliott	Timbaland	4:22
9.	"I Want to Talk to You"	Jones; Lewis; Alvin West	L.E.S.; Alvin West	4:36
10.	"Dr. Knockboot"	Jones; Samuel Barnes; Jean-Claude Olivier	Trackmasters	2:25
11.	"Life Is What You Make It" (featuring DMX)	Jones; Lewis; Earl Simmons	L.E.S.	4:04
12.	"Big Things"	Jones; Michael Masser; West	Alvin West	3:39
13.	"Nas Is Like"	Jones; Martin	DJ Premier	3:57
14.	"K-I-SS-I-N-G"	Jones; Robert Kelly; Lewis; West	L.E.S.; Alvin West	4:15
15.	"Money Is My Bitch"	Jones; Barnes; Olivier	Alvin West; Trackmasters	4:02
16.	"Undying Love"	Jones; Lewis	L.E.S.	4:23
Total length:				64:45

Notes

- On the cassette version, "Pray" featuring Bravehearts is included as track 13, produced by EZ Elpee.

=== Samples ===
"Album Intro"

- "Amityville Horror Main Title" by Lalo Schifrin
- "Live at the Barbeque" by Main Source

"N.Y. State of Mind Pt. II"

- "Flight Time" by Donald Byrd
- "Mahogany" by Eric B. & Rakim
- "Coup de Coeur" by Richard Clayderman

"Hate Me Now"

- "O Fortuna" from Carl Orff's Carmina Burana

"Small World"

- "Love to Last Forever" by Zulema

"We Will Survive"

- "This Is It" by Kenny Loggins

"Dr. Knockboot"

- "Say What" by Idris Muhammad
- "We Got It" by Cam'ron

"You Won't See Me Tonight"

- "Hang On" by Jerry Goldsmith

"Life Is What You Make It"

- "Vitroni's Theme - King Is Dead" by Roy Ayers

"Big Things"

- "Theme from Mahogany" by Diana Ross

"Pray"

- "Daydreamin" by Earth, Wind & Fire

"Nas Is Like"

- "Why?" by Don Robertson
- "What Child Is This?" by John V. Rydgren and Bob R. Way
- "It Ain't Hard to Tell" by Nas
- "Nobody Beats the Biz" by Biz Markie
- "Street Dreams" by Nas

"K-I-SS-I-N-G"

- "When a Woman's Fed Up" by R. Kelly

"Undying Love"

- "Milk and Honey" by Jackson C. Frank

== Personnel ==
Credits for I Am... adapted from Muze.

- Eddie Sancho – engineer
- Kevin Crouse – engineer
- Steve Souder – engineer
- Nas – performer
- Puff Daddy – performer
- Aaliyah – performer
- Scarface – performer
- DMX – performer
- DJ Premier – producer
- Pretty Boy – producer
- Nashiem Myrick – producer
- L.E.S. – producer
- Grease – producer

== Charts ==
=== Weekly charts ===
Chart (1999)	Peak position
Australian Albums (ARIA)	77
Canadian Albums (Billboard)	2
Dutch Albums (Album Top 100)	61
French Albums (SNEP)	23
German Albums (Offizielle Top 100)	16
Norwegian Albums (VG-lista)	34
Swedish Albums (Sverigetopplistan)	43
Swiss Albums (Schweizer Hitparade)	38
UK Albums (Official Charts)	31
US Billboard 200	1
US Top R&B/Hip-Hop Albums (Billboard)	1

=== Year-end charts ===
Chart (1999)	Position
US Billboard 200	40
US Top R&B/Hip-Hop Albums (Billboard)	9

== Certifications ==
Region	Certification	Certified units/sales
United States (RIAA)	2× Platinum	2,000,000^{^}
^{^} Shipments figures based on certification alone.

== See also ==
- Number-one albums of 1999 (U.S.)
- List of number-one R&B albums of 1999 (U.S.)
