= Nastradamus =

Studio album by Nas
- Released: November 23, 1999
- Recorded: 1999
- Genres: East Coast hip-hop; R&B
- Length: 62:43
- Labels: Ill Will; Columbia
- Producers: Dame Grease; L.E.S.; Havoc; Rich Nice; DJ Premier; Timbaland

Nas chronology
I Am... (1999)	Nastradamus (1999)	Stillmatic (2001)

Singles from Nastradamus
- 1. "Nastradamus" Released: October 26, 1999; 2. "You Owe Me" Released: 1999

Professional ratings
Review scores
Source	Rating
AllMusic	2.5/5 stars
Chicago Tribune	mixed
Robert Christgau	(neither)
Entertainment Weekly	A−
Los Angeles Times	2.5/4 stars
PopMatters	mixed
Rolling Stone	2/5 stars
USA Today	3.5/4 stars
The Washington Post	favorable
Yahoo! Music	mixed

Nastradamus is the fourth studio album by American rapper Nas, released on November 23, 1999, by Ill Will and Columbia Records. It was originally intended to be composed entirely of material from sessions for I Am... and released October 26, but in response to bootlegging of that material, release was postponed one month for Nas to record new material for Nastradamus.

The album debuted at number 7 on the US Billboard 200, selling over 232,000 copies in its first week. It received generally mixed reviews from critics, and has been regarded by some as Nas's weakest effort. However, it achieved considerable commercial success and spawned two charting singles. On December 22, 1999, the album was certified Platinum in sales by the Recording Industry Association of America (RIAA).

In retrospect, Nas said: "On that album, there’s a couple of songs that have a certain sound to it that doesn’t sound like anything else I’ve done. And it was a gray area in my life and that album represents that gray area. It was personal stuff that I’d rather not elaborate on. But I have nothing against that album."

== Track listing ==
No.	Title	Writer(s)	Producer(s)	Length
1.	"The Prediction"	Nasir Jones; Richard Jackson; Jessica Care Moore	Rich Nice	1:19
2.	"Life We Chose"	Jones; Leshan Lewis; Fred Wesley Jr.	L.E.S.	4:08
3.	"Nastradamus"	Jones; Lewis; James Brown	L.E.S.	4:11
4.	"Some of Us Have Angels"	Jones; Damon Blackmon	Dame Grease	4:15
5.	"Project Windows" (featuring Ronald Isley)	Jones; Nashiem Myrick; Carlos Broady	Nashiem Myrick & Carlos "6 July" Broady for The Hitmen	4:55
6.	"Come Get Me"	Jones; Christopher Martin	DJ Premier	5:31
7.	"Shoot 'Em Up"	Jones; Kejuan Muchita	Havoc	2:53
8.	"Last Words" (featuring Nashawn)	Jones; Lewis; Ralph Middlebrooks; James Williams; Billy Beck; Clarence Satchell; Leroy Bonner; Marshall Jones; Marvin Pierce; Nashawn Jones	L.E.S.	5:31
9.	"Family" (featuring Mobb Deep)	Jones; Lewis; Albert Johnson; Blackmon	Dame Grease	5:16
10.	"God Love Us"	Jones; Blackmon	Dame Grease	4:37
11.	"Quiet Niggas" (featuring Bravehearts)	Jones; Blackmon; Eugene Gray; Jabari Jones; Michael Epps	Dame Grease	4:57
12.	"Big Girl"	Jones; Lewis; Lamar Bryant; Rob Douglas	L.E.S.	4:19
13.	"New World"	Jones; Lewis; Jeff Porcaro; David Paich	L.E.S.	4:00
14.	"You Owe Me" (featuring Ginuwine)	Jones; Tim Mosley; Stephen Garrett	Timbaland	4:47
15.	"The Outcome"	Jones; Moore; Jackson	Rich Nice	1:54
Total length:				62:33

=== Sample credits ===
Life We Chose

- "Peace Fugue" by Bernie Worrell

Nastradamus

- "(It's Not the Express) It's the JB's Monaurail" by The J.B.'s

Come Get Me

- "We’re Just Trying to Make It" by The Persuaders
- "Week-End" by Cox Orange
- "It's Mine" by Mobb Deep

Last Words

- "Good Luck Charm" by Ohio Players

Big Girl

- "You're a Big Girl Now" by The Stylistics

New World

- "Africa" by Toto

Shoot 'Em Up

- "Carol of the Bells" by Mykola Leontovych
- "If I Die 2nite" by 2Pac
- "Shoot 'Em Up" by Cypress Hill

== Charts ==
=== Weekly charts ===
Chart (1999)	Peak position
Dutch Albums (Album Top 100)	90
German Albums (Offizielle Top 100)	45
Swiss Albums (Schweizer Hitparade)	92
US Billboard 200	7
US Top R&B/Hip-Hop Albums (Billboard)	2

=== Year-end charts ===
Chart (2000)	Peak position
US Billboard 200	86
US Top R&B/Hip-Hop Albums (Billboard)	18

== Certifications ==
Region	Certification	Certified units/sales
Canada (Music Canada)	Gold	50,000^{^}
United Kingdom (BPI)	Silver	60,000^{*}
United States (RIAA)	Platinum	1,000,000^{^}
^{*} Sales figures based on certification alone.^{^} Shipments figures based on certification alone.
