= 8 Rules of Love =

2023 book

- Author: Jay Shetty
- Language: English
- Genre: Self-help, relationships, nonfiction
- Published: 31 January 2023
- Publisher: Simon & Schuster

8 Rules of Love: How to Find It, Keep It, and Let It Go is author Jay Shetty’s second book that was published by Simon & Schuster.

The book offers advice for people struggling with their relationships. It was published on January 31, 2023 and within one week the book became a New York Times best-seller.

Shetty went on a 30-city world tour called "Love Rules" when promoting the book.

== 8 Rules of Love ==
The book's rules of love are:

- Rule 1: Let yourself be alone
- Rule 2: Don't ignore your karma
- Rule 3: Define love before you think it, feel it or say it
- Rule 4: Your partner is your guru
- Rule 5: Your purpose comes first
- Rule 6: Win or lose together
- Rule 7: You don't break in a breakup
- Rule 8: Love and love again

== Critical reception ==
People, “Whether single, married or facing relationship obstacles, Shetty's book will "guide you from loneliness to self-awareness."”

According to The New York Times, “The new book explores the four Vedic stages of love — preparing for love, practicing love, protecting love and perfecting love — with simple exercises and takeaways. There is a list of first date questions like, “What is occupying your thoughts most at the moment?” And for readers in relationships, there is a “social calendar” worksheet — to help people make time for themselves that is separate from time with their significant other or with friends.”
