= Choosey Lover =

Single by The Isley Brothers

from the album Between the Sheets
- B-side: "The Highways of My Life"
- Released: 1983
- Recorded: 1983
- Genre: Soul
- Length: 4:41
- Label: T-Neck
- Songwriters: Ernie Isley, Marvin Isley, Chris Jasper, Rudolph Isley, O'Kelly Isley and Ronald Isley.
- Producers: Ronald Isley, Rudolph Isley

The Isley Brothers singles chronology
"Between the Sheets" (1983)	"Choosey Lover" (1983)	"Let's Make Love Tonight" (1984)

"Choosey Lover" is a 1983 soul song by The Isley Brothers (Originally titled "Juicy Lover").

== Background ==
Released on their T-Neck imprint, the song was their second consecutive top ten R&B hit after their seminal "Between the Sheets" hit No. 3 on that chart. It was the second of two chart-topping singles the Isleys released off their aptly titled Between the Sheets album. The song has similarities to the Earth, Wind & Fire song "Devotion".

"Choosey Lover" was also the last charting single to feature the 3 + 3 lineup of the band. A year later, younger brothers Ernie Isley (who played the memorable guitar solos on the song and co-wrote the lyrics), Marvin Isley and their brother-in-law Chris Jasper left to form Isley-Jasper-Isley while older brothers Ronald Isley, Rudolph Isley and O'Kelly Isley continued on under the "Isley Brothers" name.

== Personnel ==
- Ronald Isley – lead vocals, background vocals
- Ernie Isley – guitar, drum machine programming, background vocals
- Marvin Isley – bass guitar, background vocals
- Chris Jasper – keyboards, piano, synthesizers, background vocals
- Rudolph Isley – background vocals
- O'Kelly Isley, Jr. – background vocals
- Produced, written, arranged and composed by The Isley Brothers and Chris Jasper

=== Charts ===
Chart performance for "Choosey Lover"
Chart (1983)	Peak position
US Hot R&B/Hip-Hop Songs	6

== Cover versions ==
- The song was covered by R&B singer Aaliyah as "Choosey Lover (Old School/New School)" on her 1996 album, One in a Million, with the "Old School" section very closely resembling the original before transitioning into the "New School" section, which features more of a hip hop beat and feel to match the contemporary feel of the rest of the album.

== Samples ==
- The song was sampled and redone to make "Buddah Lovaz", a song dedicated to marijuana, by Bone Thugs-n-Harmony
- It was sampled as the remix to "Street Dreams" by Nas featuring R. Kelly.
- The song also has elements which have been used in Keith Sweat's "Nobody" and his 2002 single, One on One.
