= Nas Is Like =

Single by Nas

from the album I Am...
- B-side: "Dr. Knockboot"
- Released: February 20, 1999
- Recorded: 1998
- Genre: East Coast hip-hop
- Length: 3:57
- Label: Columbia
- Songwriter(s): Nasir Jones; Chris Martin
- Producer(s): DJ Premier

Nas singles chronology
"Grand Finale" (1998)	"Nas Is Like" (1999)	"Hate Me Now" (1999)

Music video
- "Nas Is Like" on YouTube

"Nas Is Like" is the first single from Nas' third album I Am.... The song is the sixth collaboration between Nas and producer DJ Premier. It was well received by critics as it was a change from the more commercial and pop-oriented singles from It Was Written and Nas, Foxy Brown, AZ, and Nature Present The Firm: The Album. The song contains a combination of braggadocios and introspective lyrics over a choppy string sample.

== Production ==
In the 14 Deadly Secrets by DJ Premier, he said:

This shit is crazy : the day I made this record, I was at my house in Long Island, and I found this old record that I was gonna throw away. It was a ten inch record from a Lutheran church, and it was pink with a black fish on it. And I was gonna throw it in the garbage, 'cuz it didn't look like it had anything hot on it. But somethin' told me "before you throw it away, put it on the turntable, see if you can find something on it". And I found that sample of "Nas Is Like", and I broke it into 3 parts, scratched it live to the drumbeat that I already had, with the little chirpin' birds and from there, "Nas Is Like" was born, man...

== Samples ==
The song is also notable for featuring one of the most sought-after samples by cratediggers. For almost a decade since the track's release, the main sample used by DJ Premier remained unknown. However, in April 2008, an unnamed MP3 file featuring the original sample used was uploaded to the Internet by Dusty Kid from Strictly Breaks. Right after, the sample was identified as "Cantata of New Life" by John Rydgren. However, it was later revealed that the track was actually John Rydgren and Bob R. Way's 1966 song "What Child Is This?", from their record Thoughts on the Carols.

Other than this, the song also contains scratched vocal samples from Nas' previous songs "It Ain't Hard to Tell" from 1994 and "Street Dreams" from 1996. The song also samples bird chirps from Don Robertson's "Why" and a vocal sample from Biz Markie's "Nobody Beats the Biz".

== Music video ==
The song's music video, directed by Nick Quested, shows Nas rapping in the Queensbridge projects and features cameos by NBA player Ron Artest and fellow Queensbridge rappers Nature and The Bravehearts. It was the first video on his YouTube channel to surpass 100 million views.

== Reception and influence ==
"Nas Is Like" was positively received on a commercial and critical level. It reached number 86 on the Billboard Hot 100, number 14 on the Canadian Singles Chart and peaked at number 3 on the Rap songs chart. M.F. DiBella of Allmusic justifies the success of "Nas Is Like" stating: "Superproducer Premier comes to save the day...["Nas Is Like" is] nothing short of Illmatic perfection. "Nas Is Like"'s symphonic composition is the perfect complement for an MC of Nas' supreme vocal quality and precise lyrics."

The song's popularity caused various songs to borrow "Nas Is Like"'s beat, structure and lyrics:

- During his brief feud with Nas, Memphis Bleek recorded a song named "Memphis Bleek Is..." which stylistically mimicked "Nas Is Like".
- On Royce da 5'9"'s 2007 mixtape The Bar Exam, he freestyles over the "Nas Is Like" instrumental and forms a song with a similar structure.
- Lyrics from "Nas Is Like" were later sampled in Braille and Rob Swift's 2008 song "The IV".
- West Coast rapper Kendrick Lamar made a freestyle to this song in January 2013 on Hot97.
- J. Cole uses the first part of Nas Is Like for the intro of his song, Let Nas Down. Nas himself would later appear on a remix of the song.
- Apathy recorded a song named "Ap is like" with the same instrumental.
- Rapper Wale sampled the song for his single "Folarin Is Like"
- The song was included in the soundtrack of NBA 2K18.

== Track listing ==
=== A-Side ===
1. "Nas Is Like" (Main) (3:50)
2. "Nas Is Like" (Clean) (3:57)
3. "Nas Is Like" (Instrumental) (3:57)

=== B-Side ===
1. "Dr. Knockboots" (Main) (2:25)
  - Produced by Poke & Tone
2. "Dr. Knockboots" (Clean) (2:25)
3. "Dr. Knockboots" (Instrumental) (2:25)

== Charts ==
=== Weekly charts ===
Weekly chart performance for "Nas is Like"
Chart (1999)	Peak position
Canada (Nielsen Soundscan)	14
US Billboard Hot 100	86
US Hot R&B/Hip-Hop Songs (Billboard)	30
US Hot Rap Songs (Billboard)	3

=== Year-end charts ===
Year-end chart performance for "Nas is Like"
Chart (1999)	Position
UK Urban (Music Week)	20
