= Light-Years (Nas and DJ Premier album) =

Studio album by Nas and DJ Premier
- Released: December 12, 2025
- Recorded: 2006–2025
- Studios: Kaufman Astoria Studios (New York City); The Hit Factory (New York City); D&D (New York City)
- Genre: Hip-hop
- Length: 48:21
- Label: Mass Appeal
- Producer: DJ Premier

Nas chronology
Magic 3 (2023)	Light-Years (2025)

DJ Premier chronology
PRhyme 2 (2018)	Light-Years (2025)

Legend Has It... chronology
Cabin in the Sky (2025)	Light-Years (2025)

Light-Years is a collaborative studio album by American rapper Nas and record producer DJ Premier. It was released on December 12, 2025, by Mass Appeal. It is the seventh and final album in Mass Appeal's Legend Has It… series of albums that were released in 2025. The album features guest appearances from rock band Steve Miller Band and fellow rapper and Nas' former Firm cohort AZ. The album earned positive reviews from critics.

== Background ==
In January 2006, during an interview for Scratch, Nas announced that he would be working with DJ Premier on a collaboration album.

In 2011, Nas revealed that the album was still in the works.

On April 19, 2024, a new single entitled "Define My Name" was released by Nas and DJ Premier, to commemorate the 30th anniversary of Nas' debut album Illmatic (1994). In the track, they announced that their long-awaited collaborative album was "coming soon", with a press release by Mass Appeal Records stating that it would be released in late 2024.

On April 16, 2025, Mass Appeal Records announced a series titled Legend Has It..., which features seven albums coming in 2025, from Nas & DJ Premier, Ghostface Killah, Raekwon, Mobb Deep, De La Soul, Big L, and Slick Rick.

On October 7, 2025, Nas revealed in an interview with Rolling Stone, that he and Premier recorded older songs that date back when the project was announced, which would be included for the album.

On November 20, 2025, Premier revealed at a Bristol concert with fellow producer The Alchemist that the album would be released on December 12 and the album's title was announced on November 25, 2025, via Nas' Instagram.

== Critical reception ==
Professional ratings
Aggregate scores
Source	Rating
Metacritic	71/100
Review scores
Source	Rating
AllMusic	3.5/5 stars
Clash	8/10
Hip Hop Golden Age	8.5/10
HotNewHipHop	4/5 stars
Pitchfork	6.2/10
RapReviews.com	7.5/10
Rolling Stone	3.5/5 stars

Light-Years received positive reviews from music critics. According to the review aggregator Metacritic, Light-Years received "generally favorable reviews" based on a weighted average score of 71 out of 100 from 5 critic scores.

== Track listing ==
All tracks are produced by DJ Premier.

Light-Years track listing
No.	Title	Writer(s)	Length
1.	"My Life Is Real"	Nasir Jones; Christopher Martin; Marco Bruno	2:39
2.	"Git Ready"	Jones; Martin; Leon Huff; Kenneth Gamble	2:51
3.	"N.Y. State of Mind Pt. 3"	Jones; Martin; Billy Joel	3:12
4.	"Welcome to the Underground"	Jones; Martin; C. Ivory	3:19
5.	"Madman"	Jones; Martin	2:24
6.	"Pause Tapes"	Jones; Martin	2:37
7.	"Writers"	Jones; Martin; Bruno	4:53
8.	"Sons (Young Kings)"	Jones; Martin; Bruno	3:03
9.	"It's Time" (with Steve Miller Band)	Jones; Martin; Adam Horovitz; Darryl McDaniels; Rick Rubin; Joseph Simmons; Steven Miller	2:28
10.	"Nasty Esco Nasir"	Jones; Martin	2:42
11.	"My Story Your Story" (featuring AZ)	Jones; Martin; Anthony Cruz; Bruno	3:48
12.	"Bouquet (To the Ladies)"	Jones; Martin; E. Record	4:28
13.	"Junkie"	Jones; Martin; P. Callender; Lalo Schifrin	3:40
14.	"Shine Together"	Jones; Martin; Arnie Oliver; Werner Schuchner	2:40
15.	"3rd Childhood"	Jones; Martin; Ivory	3:29
Total length:			48:21

=== Sample credits ===
- "GiT Ready" contains a sample from "Get Me Back on Time, Engine Number 9" written by Roger Miller and performed by Wilson Pickett, and "Queen of My Dreams" written and performed by Rusty Wier.
- "N.Y. State of Mind Pt. 3" contains a sample from "New York State of Mind" written and performed by Billy Joel, and "Flight Time" written and performed by Donald Byrd.
- "Madman" contains a sample from "Main Title and Mountain Visions" written and performed by John Williams.
- "Pause Tapes" contains a sample from "1000 Rads" written and performed by David Axelrod.
- "Writers" contains a sample from "Pete 90" written and performed by the 45 King.
- "It's Time" contains a sample from "Fly Like an Eagle" written and performed by Steve Miller Band.
- "Nasty Esco Nasir" contains a sample from "Tightrope" written and performed by Jeff Lynne.
- "Bouquet (To the Ladies)" contains a sample from "Here Comes the Sun" written and performed by Eugene Record.
- "Junkie" contains a sample from "The Liquidator (Closing Version)" written by Lalo Schifrin and performed by Schifrin and Shirley Bassey.
- "Shine Together" contains a sample from "Let Love Flow for Peace" written and performed by Sunbear.
- "3rd Childhood" contains a sample from "2nd Childhood" written and performed by Nasir Jones and Christopher Martin.

== Personnel ==
Credits adapted from Tidal.

- Nas – lead vocals
- DJ Premier – production, mixing, programming
- Zeke Mishanec – engineering (tracks 1–13)
- Nef – engineering (1, 2, 4–10, 12, 15)
- Mark "Exit" Goodchild – engineering (3, 13, 14)
- King of Chill – engineering (14)
- Parks Vallely – engineering (14)
- Tony Dawsey – mastering
- Sam Lazarev – engineering assistance (1, 9)
- Jared Klinghoffer – engineering assistance (1)
- Maximilien Hein – engineering assistance (2, 5)
- Majeston – engineering assistance (2)
- Brendon O'Neill – engineering assistance (3, 4)
- Ulana Hapij – engineering assistance (3)
- Rich Evatt – engineering assistance (6, 15)
- Kevin Cartwright – engineering assistance (7, 13)
- Wilfried Haslauer – engineering assistance (8, 13)
- Evan Dollar – engineering assistance (9)
- Guenole Georgelin – engineering assistance (10)
- Justin Klatzko – engineering assistance (11, 12)
- Grayson Thomas – engineering assistance (12)

== Charts ==
Chart performance for Light-Years
Chart (2025–2026)	Peak position
Australian Hip Hop/R&B Albums (ARIA)	19
French Physical Albums (SNEP)	121
Japanese Dance & Soul Albums (Oricon)	3
Japanese Digital Albums (Oricon)	29
Japanese Western Albums (Oricon)	12
Japanese Download Albums (Billboard Japan)	23
Scottish Albums (Official Charts)	28
Swiss Albums (Schweizer Hitparade)	33
UK Albums Sales (OCC)	42
UK Independent Albums (Official Charts)	15
UK R&B Albums (Official Charts)	3
US Billboard 200	47
US Independent Albums (Billboard)	3
US Top R&B/Hip-Hop Albums (Billboard)	9

== Release history ==
Light-Years release history
Region	Date	Format	Label	Ref.
Various	December 12, 2025	Cassette; CD; digital download; streaming; vinyl	Mass Appeal	
