= Bravehearted =

Studio album by Bravehearts
- Released: December 23, 2003
- Recorded: 2003
- Genre: East Coast hip hop; hardcore hip hop
- Length: 48:57
- Label: Ill Will; Columbia; Sony Urban
- Producer: Nas (exec.); Bastiany; Ez Elpee; Jungle; L.E.S.; Lil Jon; Midi Mafia; Neo Da Matrix; Paul Poli; Swizz Beatz

Bravehearts chronology
Bravehearted (2003)	Bravehearted 2 (2008)

Singles from Bravehearted
- 1. "Quick to Back Down" Released: 2003

Professional ratings
Review scores
Source	Rating
Allmusic	3/5 stars

Bravehearted is the debut studio album by the American duo the Bravehearts. A group consisting of Nas' brother Jungle and fellow friend Wiz.

== Commercial performance ==
The album did not sell well due to little promotion, it only came in at number 75 in the Billboard 200 Charts and 20 in the Hip Hop/R&B Charts. Besides Nas releasing an album off his Ill Will Records, Bravehearts were the only other label members to release a record off this label.

== Singles ==
The album had one single, "Quick to Back Down". The track was produced by Lil Jon and featured Nas and Lil Jon on the track. The chorus had Nas saying quick phrases in distaste for animosity towards anonymous rappers, followed by Lil Jon yelling "quick to back down!" The song was released in 2003, when the beef with Nas and Jay-Z was still brewing. Nas sent out a subliminal line to Jay-Z with the line "First of all this is Nas I'ma Braveheart veteran/and y'all already know who I'm better than." He also said "Who's the next label I'ma bury?/CEO's, rappers and A&R's go to the rap cemetery," which indirectly implies that of Roc-A-Fella. Overall, Nas as well as Wiz and Jungle rhyme with threatening messages, with "Y'all talk shit but I smell fear, mothafuckas" at the end of the verses.

== Subliminals ==
The album had 2 songs dissing Jay-Z, with “Quick to Back Down” and “Bravehearted” featuring Nas. Nas on “Quick to Back Down” he sent a few subliminal since the beef between him and Jay-Z was still brewing. He said “First of all this is Nas I'ma Braveheart veteran/and y'all already know who I'm better than." He also said "Who's the next label I'ma bury?/CEO's, rappers and A&R's go to the rap cemetery”.

On the album's title track “Bravehearted” which also features Nas, Jungle (Nas’ brother) took shots at Jay-Z by namedropping him and referring to him as a "bitch". It is apparently Jungle's response to Jay-Z dissing him, Nas and Jaz-O on Blueprint 2 that previous year. Furthermore, Jungle had referred to rapper 50 Cent as a "snitch". After the release of the album, the beef with Jay-Z died down and a reconciliation took place in October 2005.

== Track listing ==
No.	Title	Producer(s)	Length
1.	"Intro"		0:54
2.	"B-Train"	Midi Mafia	2:24
3.	"Quick To Back Down" (featuring Nas and Lil Jon)	Lil Jon	4:39
4.	"Twilight" (featuring Nas)	Swizz Beatz	4:08
5.	"Bravehearted" (featuring Nas)	Jungle	3:02
6.	"For The Love" (interlude)		0:49
7.	"Buss My Gun" (featuring Nashawn)	Midi Mafia	4:00
8.	"Cash Flow" (featuring Nashawn)	Lil Jon	4:05
9.	"Situations" (featuring Nas and Jully Black)	Bastiany	3:36
10.	"Freak Off" (interlude)		0:34
11.	"I Wanna"	L.E.S.	4:00
12.	"Sensations"	Midi Mafia	3:29
13.	"Realize" (featuring Nashawn and Teedra Moses)	Paul Poli	3:57
14.	"I Will"	Neo	4:19
15.	"Oochie Wally" (remix) (featuring Nas)	EZ Elpee	5:01
Total length:			48:57

== Chart positions ==
Chart (2003)	Peak position
US Billboard 200	75
US Billboard R&B/Hip-Hop Albums	20
