= Define My Name =

Single by Nas & DJ Premier
- Released: April 19, 2024
- Recorded: 2024; Kaufman Astoria Studios (New York)
- Genre: Hip hop
- Length: 3:11
- Label: Mass Appeal
- Songwriters: Nasir Jones; Christopher Edward Martin
- Producer: DJ Premier

Nas singles chronology
"Ultra Black" (2020)	"Define My Name" (2024)

"Define My Name" is a single from Nas and DJ Premier. The track produced by Premier, was released to streaming services on April 19, 2024.

== Background ==
On April 19, 2024, a new single entitled "Define My Name" was released by Nas and DJ Premier, to commemorate the 30th anniversary of Nas' debut album, Illmatic (1994). In the track, they announced that their long-awaited collaborative album was "coming soon", with a press release by Mass Appeal Records stating that it would be released in late 2024.

On April 16, 2025, Mass Appeal Records announced a series titled Legend Has It..., which features seven albums coming in 2025, from Nas & DJ Premier, Ghostface Killah, Raekwon, Mobb Deep, De La Soul, Big L, and Slick Rick.

The album, titled Light-Years, was released on December 12, 2025. However, "Define My Name" was not included in the tracklist.

== Critical reception ==
Professional ratings
Review scores
Source	Rating
Clash	8/10

Robin Murray of Clash praised the song and wrote, "Out now on – truly, where else? – Mass Appeal, Define My Name comes as Stateside rap’s MVPs become embroiled in a war of words. Finessing his skills, sharpening his pen, Nas – together with sublime sound tapestries from DJ Premier – has provided a bona fide headline-rattling event of his own." Elias Andrews of HotNewHipHop wrote, "It doesn't get more legendary than Nas and DJ Premier. The rapper and producer symbolize the purest form of hip-hop, and they've both been doing it for four decades."

== Release history ==
Release formats for "Define My Name"
Region	Date	Format	Label	Ref.
Various	April 19, 2024	Digital download; streaming	Mass Appeal	
