= Grand Finale (song) =

Single by DMX featuring Ja Rule, Method Man and Nas

from the album Belly (Original Motion Picture Soundtrack)
- Released: October 27, 1998
- Recorded: 1998
- Genre: East Coast hip-hop
- Length: 4:37
- Label: Def Jam Recordings
- Songwriters: Nasir Jones; Irving Lorenzo; Robin Mays; Lorenzo Patterson; Earl Simmons; Clifford Smith; Andre Young
- Producers: Irv Gotti; Lil' Rob

DMX singles chronology
"How's It Goin' Down" (1998)	"Grand Finale" (1998)	"Money, Cash, Hoes" (1998)

Ja Rule singles chronology
"Can I Get A..." (1998)	"Grand Finale" (1998)	"Holla Holla" (1999)

Method Man singles chronology
"Judgement Day" (1998)	"Grand Finale" (1998)	"Pussy Pop" (1998)

Nas singles chronology
"Phone Tap" (1997)	"Grand Finale" (1998)	"Nas Is Like" (1999)

"Grand Finale" is a song by rappers DMX, Ja Rule, Method Man and Nas. It is first single from the soundtrack to the 1998 film, Belly. The single made it to number 63 on the Hot R&B/Hip-Hop Singles & Tracks and number 18 on the Hot Rap Singles.

"Grand Finale" samples "Prelude" by N.W.A.

There's also a remix which features Vita (exclusively on vinyl)

== Charts ==
Chart (1998)	Peak position
US Bubbling Under Hot 100 (Billboard)	17
US Hot R&B/Hip-Hop Songs (Billboard)	63
US Hot Rap Songs (Billboard)	18
