= Hate Me Now =

1999 song by Nas ft. Puff Daddy

- US cover

Single by Nas featuring Puff Daddy

from the album I Am...
- B-side: "If I Ruled the World (Imagine That)"; "Street Dreams"
- Released: April 6, 1999
- Recorded: 1998
- Genre: Hip hop
- Length: 4:44
- Label: Columbia
- Songwriters: Jones; Gavin Marchand
- Producers: D-Moet; Pretty Boy; Trackmasters

Nas singles chronology
"Nas Is Like" (1999)	"Hate Me Now" (1999)	"Did You Ever Think" (1999)

Puff Daddy singles chronology
"All Night Long" (1999)	"Hate Me Now" (1999)	"P.E. 2000" (1999)

Music video
- "Hate Me Now" on YouTube

"Hate Me Now" is the second and final single by rapper Nas featuring Puff Daddy, from Nas' third studio album I Am.... The backbeat is inspired by, and contains some samples from, Carl Orff's "Carmina Burana". It was ranked 119 on XXL's 250 Best Songs of the 1990s.

== Production and release ==
In a 2007 interview with Rolling Stone, Nas recalled the making of the song: "It was a track D-Moet produced for Foxy Brown, and she didn't want the record, she didn't like it. It fit with my album, I Am..., so I did the D-Moet track and it sounded perfect for Puff to be on, so I gave it to him, went to the studio, and he rocked it, knocked it out."

"Hate Me Now" was released as a single in the U.S. by Columbia Records on April 6, 1999.

== Composition ==
Biographer Ronin Ro describes Combs's persona in "Hate Me Now" as "the angry young rapper battling jealous critics," a theme that would influence Combs's 1999 album Forever. The beat samples "Carmina Burana" by Carl Orff. In the second verse, Nas raps "Bill Gate dreams," dropping the final -s from Bill Gates's surname to fit the English noun-noun compound pattern in which the modifying noun appears in singular form (as in "trouser press" or "four-wheel drive").

== Critical reception ==
For RapReviews.com, Steve Juon said that "Hate Me Now" was the "only truly overpowering song" from I Am...: "It may be yet another mad track about playa hating, but the rebuttal of the hate is crisp and well defined - owing little to cliche." In 2013, Complex ranked the "Hate Me Now" video no. 8 in its "50 Best Rap Videos of the '90s" list.

== Charts ==
=== Weekly charts ===
Chart (1999)	Peak position
Australia (ARIA)	55
Austria (Ö3 Austria Top 40)	32
Belgium (Ultratip Bubbling Under Flanders)	4
Germany (GfK)	11
Netherlands (Dutch Top 40)	17
Netherlands (Single Top 100)	11
Scotland Singles (OCC)	35
Sweden (Sverigetopplistan)	55
Switzerland (Schweizer Hitparade)	30
UK Hip Hop/R&B (OCC)	3
UK Singles (OCC)	14
US Billboard Hot 100	62
US Hot R&B/Hip-Hop Songs (Billboard)	18
US Hot Rap Songs (Billboard)	8

=== Year-end charts ===
Chart (1999)	Position
Germany (Official German Charts)	99
Netherlands (Dutch Top 40)	114
Netherlands (Single Top 100)	93

== Music video and Sean Combs assault incident ==
The music video for the single, directed by Hype Williams and featuring Nas being crucified, was the subject of extreme controversy, as the original edit also featured Sean Combs, then known as Puff Daddy, on the cross. Puffy, who was a Catholic, had demanded that his crucifixion scene be excluded from the broadcast edit of the video. However, the wrong edit was incorrectly sent to MTV, which aired that version on the April 15, 1999, edition of TRL. Within minutes of the broadcast, Combs had barged into the offices of Nas' former manager, Steve Stoute, with several bodyguards, and struck Stoute over the head with a champagne bottle. In June 1999, Stoute sued Combs, resulting in a $500,000 out-of-court settlement from Combs.

Combs released a statement afterwards where he said: “I’m glad to get this whole incident behind me. And it’s now time for me to do what I do best – concentrate on my album and give back to my fans.”

== Use in media ==
- The song was used as the entrance song for Nate Diaz at finale of the 5th season of The Ultimate Fighter
- The song was used as the entrance song for Marcus Aurelio at UFC 102.
- The song was used during a promo package for professional wrestler The Miz at WrestleMania XXVII.
- The song was used in Skam Season 3 Episode 6 "Escobar Season".
- The song was used in the soundtrack for basketball video game NBA 2K14
- The song was used in a musical production in Episode 9 of Dear White People (TV series)
- A remix of the song is featured in the first official trailer for the 2023 film Gran Turismo, based on the racing simulation video game series of the same name.
