= Bravehearted 2 =

Studio album by Bravehearts
- Released: April 22, 2008
- Genre: Hip hop
- Length: 55:59
- Label: Money Machine; Ill Will
- Producer: Cover Cod Click; DJ Honda; L.E.S.; Loffy; Money Machine; Nut; Q Butta

Bravehearts chronology
Bravehearted (2003)	Bravehearted 2 (2008)

Bravehearted 2 is the second studio album by American hip hop duo Bravehearts, who have served as New York City rapper Nas's entourage since the 1990s. The group used to consist of Jungle (Nas's younger brother), G-Wiz, Horse, Nashawn and later, Lakey the Kid, but due to personal differences the group split up, and now BraveHearts is currently a duo consisting of remaining members Jungle and Nashawn.

== Track listing ==
No.	Title	Producer(s)	Length
1.	"A Ha"	Money Machine	3:46
2.	"Slide Wit Me"	Loffy	4:24
3.	"Good Money"	Money Machine	3:14
4.	"Live or Die" (featuring AD)	Money Machine	5:12
5.	"Pocket or Two" (featuring D-Stress and Cory Gunz)	Cover Cod Click	4:08
6.	"Gun On Me"	Money Machine	3:28
7.	"I Want In" (featuring Nas)	L.E.S.	3:42
8.	"It's Getting Hot"	Nut	2:50
9.	"Is You Aight"	L.E.S.	3:57
10.	"Mean Tongue"	Money Machine	3:20
11.	"A Bronx Tale" (featuring Sier Castro and Billy Red)	Money Machine	5:28
12.	"Gangsta"	DJ Honda	3:23
13.	"I'm Looking For Him"	Money Machine	3:19
14.	"One Way" (featuring G-Wiz)	Q-Butta	3:03
15.	"When I Find You"	Money Machine	2:45
Total length:			55:59
