= Belly (soundtrack) =

Belly (Original Motion Picture Soundtrack)

Soundtrack album by Def Jam Recordings
- Released: November 3, 1998
- Studio: Battery Studios (Chicago, Illinois); Chicago Trax Recording Studio (Chicago); Electric Lady Studios (New York City); Clinton Recording Studio (New York City); The Hit Factory (New York City); Daddy's House Recording Studio (New York City); Quad Recording Studios (New York City); Alien Flyers (New York City); The Idea Lounge; D&D Studios (New York City); Carriage House Studios (Stamford, Connecticut); 36 Chambers Studio (New York City); Mirror Image West; The Source Sound Lab; Sound Factory (New York City); The Music Palace (New York City)
- Genre: East Coast hip-hop; hardcore hip-hop; gangsta rap; contemporary R&B
- Length: 70:13
- Label: Polygram; Def Jam
- Producer: Hype (also exec.); Lyor Cohen (also exec.); Irv Gotti (also exec.); Dame Grease; Derrick Trotman; DJ Premier; EZ Elpee; Hangmen 3; Knobody; Lil' Rob; P. Diddy; Poisoned Ivy; Poke & Tone; R. Kelly; RZA; Spencer Bellamy; Swizz Beatz; Tony "CD" Kelly

Singles from Belly (Original Motion Picture Soundtrack)
- 1. "Grand Finale" Released: October 27, 1998; 2. "Devil's Pie" Released: October 31, 1998; 3. "What About" Released: 1998

Professional ratings
Review scores
Source	Rating
AllMusic	3/5 stars

Belly (Original Motion Picture Soundtrack) is the soundtrack to Hype Williams' 1998 film Belly. It was released on November 3, 1998, through Def Jam Recordings and featured production from the likes of Poke & Tone, Dame Grease, Sean Combs and Swizz Beatz. The soundtrack was a success, peaking at number 5 on the Billboard 200 and number 2 on the Top R&B/Hip-Hop Albums, and spawned the single "Grand Finale" by rappers DMX, Ja Rule, Method Man and Nas. "Grand Finale" made it to number 63 on the Hot R&B/Hip-Hop Songs and number 18 on the Hot Rap Songs. Four music video singles were released for "What About", "Grand Finale", "Movin' Out", and "Tommy's Theme", with the last three music videos being directed by Williams.

== Track listing ==
No.	Title	Writer(s)	Producer(s)	Length
1.	"No Way in, No Way Out" (performed by Lady)	R. Kelly	R. Kelly	4:34
2.	"Devil's Pie" (performed by D'Angelo)	M. Archer; C. Martin	DJ Premier	5:20
3.	"Grand Finale" (performed by DMX, Ja Rule, Method Man and Nas)	C. Smith; E. Simmons; N. Jones; I. Lorenzo; R. Mays; A. Young; L. Patterson	Irv Gotti; Lil' Rob	4:37
4.	"Never Dreamed You'd Leave in Summer" (performed by Jerome)	S. Wonder; S. Wright	Sean "Puffy" Combs	3:03
5.	"What About" (performed by Sparkle)	R. Kelly	R. Kelly	4:43
6.	"Two Sides" (performed by Hot Totti)	L. Raynor; D. Blackmon	Dame Grease	3:50
7.	"Movin' Out" (performed by Mýa, Raekwon and Noreaga)	M. Harrison; C. Woods; V. Santiago; J. Foster; C. M. Johnson	Knobody	5:03
8.	"Top Shotter" (performed by DMX, Sean Paul and Mr. Vegas)	C. Smith; E. Simmons; S. Henriques; A. Kelly	Tony "CD" Kelly	3:22
9.	"Story to Tell" (performed by Ja Rule)	J. Atkins; I. Lorenzo; R. Mays	Irv Gotti; Lil' Rob	3:48
10.	"Crew Love" (performed by Jay-Z, Beanie Sigel and Memphis Bleek)	D. Grant; M. Cox; S. Carter; D. Trotman; K. Young	Derrick Trotman	3:47
11.	"Sometimes" (performed by Noreaga and Maze)	V. Santiago; M. Allen; L. Porter; J. Peters	EZ Elpee	5:04
12.	"We All Can Get It On" (performed by Drag-On)	M. Smalls; K. Dean	Swizz Beatz	3:17
13.	"Militia Remix" (performed by Gang Starr, Rakim and WC)	K. Elam; W. Calhoun; W. Griffin; C. Martin	DJ Premier; GuRu (co.)	3:38
14.	"Windpipe" (performed by RZA, Ghostface Killah and Ol' Dirty Bastard)	D. Coles; R. Diggs	RZA	4:48
15.	"Pre-Game" (performed by Sauce Money and Jay-Z)	S. Carter; T. Gaither; S. Bellamy	Spencer Bellamy	1:51
16.	"Tommy's Theme" (performed by Made Men and The Lox)	A. Grant; D. Styles; J. Phillips; J. Neal; J. Bynoe; M. Ennis; R. Scott; S. Jacobs	Hangmen 3	4:22
17.	"Some Niggaz" (performed by Half-a-Mil)	J. Wardlaw; M. Hines	Poisoned Ivy	3:06
18.	"I Wanna Live" (performed by Bravehearts)	E. Gray; J. Jones; M. Epps; J. Olivier; S. Barnes; N. Jones	Poke & Tone	4:51
Total length:				1:13:04

== Personnel ==
- Abdul Haqq Islam – executive producer (track 7)
- Andy Katz – recording (track 13)
- Anthony Grant – performer (track 16)
- Anthony Harmon – bass guitar (track 1)
- Anthony "CD" Kelly – producer & recording (track 8)
- Anthony Kilhoffer – programming & recording (track 1)
- Brian "Big Bass" Gardner – mastering (track 13)
- Byron Rickerson – assistant recording (track 1)
- Chandra Crawford – backing vocals (track 1)
- Chris Brickley – recording (track 5)
- Christopher Martin – producer (tracks: 2, 13), mixing (track 13)
- Claude Reynolds – assistant engineering (track 8)
- Clifford Smith – performer (track 8)
- Clifford Smith Jr. – performer (track 3)
- Corey Woods – performer (track 7)
- Crystal M. Johnson – vocal arranger (track 7)
- Cynthia Jernigan – backing vocals (tracks: 1, 5)
- Damon Blackman – producer & recording (track 6)
- Dave O'Donnell – assistant engineering (track 15)
- David Styles – performer (track 16)
- Dennis Coles – performer (track 14)
- Derrick Trotman – producer (track 10)
- Dexter Thibou – assistant engineering (track 13)
- Doug Wilson – mixing (track 7)
- Dragan Čačinović-Čač – recording (track 7)
- Dwight Equan Grant – performer (track 10)
- Earl Simmons – performer (tracks: 3, 8)
- Ed Raso – recording (track 4)
- Eddie Sancho – engineering (track 13)
- Eugene Gray – performer (track 18)
- Franchon Priolenau – A&R
- Gail Hansen – A&R
- Gordon Chambers – backing vocals & vocal producer (track 4)
- Greg Landfair – guitar (track 1)
- Harold "Hype" Williams – executive producer
- Irving Domingo Lorenzo Jr. – producer (tracks: 3, 9), A&R, executive producer
- Jabari Jones – performer (track 18)
- Jason Phillips – performer (track 16)
- Jasun Wardlaw – performer (track 17)
- Jean-Claude Olivier – producer (track 18)
- Jean-Marie Horvat – mixing (track 4)
- Jeff Vereb – assistant mixing (track 1)
- Jeffrey Atkins – performer (tracks: 3, 9)
- Jeffrey Backues Neal – performer & producer (track 16)
- Jeffery "J Dub" Walker – producer (track 4)
- Jermain Baxter – performer (track 18)
- Jerome Childers – performer (track 4)
- Jerome Foster – producer (track 7)
- Joey Donatello – programming & recording (track 1)
- John Bynoe – producer (track 16)
- John Montagnese – assistant recording (track 13)
- Julie Greenwald – management
- Kasseem Dean – producer (track 12)
- Ken "Duro" Ifill – mixing (tracks: 3, 9, 18)
- Kendall D. Nesbitt – backing vocals & keyboards (track 1)
- Kenny Ortiz – recording (track 16)
- Kevin Crouse – mixing (track 11)
- Keith Edward Elam – performer & co-producer (track 13)
- Kimberly A. Jefferson – backing vocals (track 1)
- Kristin A. Partee – backing vocals (track 1)
- Lamont Porter – producer (track 11)
- Larry Sturm – programming & recording (track 1)
- Lyor Cohen – executive producer
- LaVita Raynor – performer (track 6)
- Malik Deshawn Cox – performer (track 10)
- Marco Ennis – performer (track 16)
- Marcus Vest – bass (track 6)
- Mario Rodriguez – mixing (track 16)
- Mark Hines – producer (track 17)
- Melvin Jason Smalls – performer (track 12)
- Michael Epps – performer (track 18)
- Michael Eugene Archer – performer (track 2)
- Michael J. Allen – performer (track 11)*Mike Koch – assistant engineering (track 15)
- Miles "Nastee" Balochian – recording (track 17)
- Mýa Harrison – performer (track 7)
- Nasir bin Olu Dara Jones – performer (tracks: 3, 18)
- Patrick Viala – mixing (track 8), recording (tracks: 3, 9–11)
- Percy Bady – additional keyboards (track 5)
- Raymond Scott – performer & producer (track 16)
- Rich Keller – mixing & recording (tracks: 6, 12)
- Rick Behrens – assistant recording (track 5)
- Robert Diggs – performer & producer (track 14)
- Robert Kelly – backing vocals & producer (tracks: 1, 5)
- Robert "Lil' Rob" Mays – producer (tracks: 3, 9)
- Ron Lowe – assistant mixing (track 5)
- Roy Hamilton – backing vocals & drum programming (track 1)
- Russell Elevado – mixing & recording (track 2)
- Russell Jones – performer (track 14)
- Samuel Barnes – producer (track 18)
- Sean "Puffy" Combs – producer (track 4)
- Sean Divine Jacobs – performer (track 16)
- Sean Paul Henriques – performer (track 8)
- Shawn Carter – performer (tracks: 10, 15)
- Spencer Bellamy – producer (track 15)
- Stan Wood – programming & recording (track 1)
- Stephanie Edwards – performer (track 5)
- Stephen George – mixing & recording (tracks: 1, 5), programming (track 5)
- Ted Wohlsen – mixing (track 7)
- Tina Davis – A&R
- Todd Gaither – performer (track 15)
- Thomas Coyne – mastering
- Tommy Uzzo – mixing & recording (track 15)
- Troy Hightower – mixing & recording (track 15)
- Victor Santiago – performer (tracks: 7, 11)
- William Loshawn Calhoun Jr. – performer (track 13)
- William Michael Griffin Jr. – performer (track 13)
- William Raynard Greer – backing vocals (track 1)

== Charts ==
=== Weekly charts ===
Chart (1998)	Peak position
US Billboard 200	5
US Top R&B/Hip-Hop Albums (Billboard)	2

=== Year-end charts ===
Chart (1999)	Position
US Top R&B/Hip-Hop Albums (Billboard)	86

== Certifications ==
Region	Certification	Certified units/sales
United States (RIAA)	Gold	500,000^{^}
^{^} Shipments figures based on certification alone.
