= Level 7 Diploma =

Level 7 Diploma is a format of formalized postgraduate learning in the United Kingdom at the master level without an academic dissertation, as recognised by the national education accreditation regulator, Ofqual.

Examples of recognised diplomas at the RQF’s seventh level include Trinity College London’s FTCL, the ABRSM’s FRSM and the University of West London’s FLCM music diplomas.
