= Nastradamus (song) =

Single by Nas

from the album Nastradamus
- Released: October 26, 1999
- Genre: East Coast hip-hop
- Length: 4:44
- Label: Ill Will; Columbia
- Songwriters: Nasir Jones; Leshan Lewis; James Brown
- Producer: L.E.S.

Nas singles chronology
"It's Mine" (1999)	"Nastradamus" (1999)	"Hot Boyz" (1999)

"Nastradamus" is the first single from Nas' fourth album of the same name. It was produced by L.E.S. The song contains the lyrics "You wanna ball 'til you fall, I can help you with that" which were viewed as a jab at Roc-A-Fella artist Memphis Bleek, sparking the beef which would eventually involve Jay-Z. The music video, directed by Jeff Byrd, was originally released in 3D with Tower Records providing "Nastradamus" 3D glasses as a tie in (this was the first ever Music Video to use the 3-D technology, wrongly credited to the 2008 Missy Elliott video "Ching-a-Ling"). Nas debuted the video with Carson Daly on MTV's TRL in November 1999. The beat uses the sample "The Monorail Express" by the J.B.'s, the same one EPMD used on their song "Let the Funk Flow" from their 1988 album Strictly Business.

== Track listing ==
=== A-side ===
1. "Nastradamus" (Album version) (4:13)
2. "Nastradamus" (Clean version) (4:13)
3. "Nastradamus" (Instrumental) (4:13)

=== B-side ===
1. "Shoot 'Em Up" (Album version) (2:56)
  - Produced by Havoc
2. "Shoot 'Em Up" (Clean version) (2:56)
3. "Shoot 'Em Up" (Instrumental) (2:51)

== Charts ==
=== Weekly charts ===
Chart (1999–2000)	Peak position
US Billboard Hot 100	92
US Hot R&B/Hip-Hop Songs (Billboard)	27
US Hot Rap Songs (Billboard)	4
UK Singles (OCC)	24
