= You Owe Me (Nas song) =

Single by Nas featuring Ginuwine

from the album Nastradamus
- Released: 1999
- Recorded: 1999
- Genre: Hip-hop; R&B
- Length: 4:48
- Label: Ill Will; Columbia
- Songwriters: Nasir Jones; Stephen Garrett; Timothy Mosley
- Producer: Timbaland

Nas singles chronology
"Hot Boyz" (1999)	"You Owe Me" (1999)	"I've Got to Have It" (2000)

Ginuwine singles chronology
"It Wasn't Me" (1999)	"You Owe Me" (1999)	"There It Is" (2001)

"You Owe Me" is a song by the American rapper Nas featuring Ginuwine, released by Ill Will and Columbia Records in 1999 as the second single from Nas's fourth album, Nastradamus (1999). Nas wrote the song with Static Major and its producer Timbaland.

"You Owe Me" was a hit on the Billboard Hot R&B/Hip-Hop Songs chart, peaking at number 13, and it was also a minor hit on the Billboard Hot 100 chart, peaking at number 59. A music video directed by David Meyers was also released; it featured cameo appearances from Destiny's Child and DMX. The song has been referenced by Jay-Z in "Blueprint 2", and also by J. Cole in his track "Let Nas Down".

== Charts ==
=== Weekly charts ===
Chart (2000)	Peak position
Germany (GfK)	87
Netherlands (Single Top 100)	100
US Billboard Hot 100	59
US Hot R&B/Hip-Hop Songs (Billboard)	13

=== Year-end charts ===
Chart (2000)	Position
US Hot R&B/Hip-Hop Songs (Billboard)	48
