= Bravehearts =

American hip hop group

- Origin: New York City, U.S.
- Genre: Hip hop
- Years active: 1998–2008
- Labels: Ill Will; Def Jam; Columbia
- Members: Jungle; Nashawn
- Past members: Wiz; Horse

Bravehearts were an American hip hop group from New York City. The group's roster originally included Jungle (born Jabari Jones, son of jazz trumpeter Olu Dara, and younger brother of hip hop star Nas), Wiz (born Mike Epps), and Horse (born E. Gray). Horse left the group in 2002, and Jungle and Wiz carried on as a duo. Wiz was in turn replaced by Nashawn, Nas's cousin.

== Biography ==
Signed to Columbia Records as part of Nas's Ill Will Records imprint, Bravehearts first emerged in 1998, collaborating with Nas, Nature, and Trackmasters on "I Wanna Live," a song on the soundtrack to the Hype Williams film Belly. From there, the Nas protégés moved on to the Nas & Ill Will Records Presents QB's Finest compilation album, and saw their track "Oochie Wally" go gold. Jungle and Wiz then began working on their full-length debut for Columbia Records. In the meantime, they appeared on 50 Cent's mixtape-style compilation Guess Who's Back?, supporting 50 Cent and Nas on the track "Who U Rep With."

The group's debut full-length album Bravehearted was released in December 2003 with Jungle and Wiz making up the core group. The album featured guest appearances from Nas, Nashawn, Lil Jon, Jully Black and Teedra Moses, and the group scored a hit single with the Lil Jon-produced track "Quick to Back Down". There may also have been a slight diss at 50 Cent on track 5 called "Bravehearted" on their album and Jungle also takes a shot at Jay-Z. Jungle states in his verse: "Jungle will live by the morals of the street, not like snitch C.J. or bitch Jay-Z." Recently Jungle was featured on a diss track on G-Unit and The Diplomats with rapper Q-Butta called "Gun On Me." In 2009, Nashawn appeared twice on Memphis rapper C-Rock's album "Tha Weight Is Over". He was featured on the track "Street Niggaz", which is a diss to Juelz Santana/Jim Jones, and on the track "We Dons".

In 2008, they released their final studio album, Bravehearted 2, with Jungle and Nashawn making up the core group.

== Ventures ==
In 2019, Jungle started his own record label; Street Dreams Record, following in his brothers Nas' footsteps with Mass Appeal Records. The first artist signed to the label was Kiing Shooter.

== Discography ==
Studio albums

- 2003: Bravehearted
- 2008: Bravehearted 2

Collaboration albums

- 2000: Nas & Ill Will Records Presents QB's Finest

Soundtrack Appearances

- 1998: Belly ("I Wanna Live")
- 2000: Baller Blockin' ("What You Gonna Do")
