= Street Dreams (song) =

Single by Nas

from the album It Was Written
- B-side: "Affirmative Action"
- Released: October 22, 1996
- Recorded: 1996
- Genre: Hip-hop; gansta rap
- Length: 4:39 (Original); 4:27 (Remix)
- Label: Columbia
- Songwriters: Nasir Jones; Samuel Barnes; David Stewart; Ann Lennox
- Producer: The Trackmasters

Nas singles chronology
"If I Ruled the World (Imagine That)" (1996)	"Street Dreams" (1996)	"The Message" (1997)

Music video
- "Street Dreams" on YouTube

"Street Dreams" is a song by American rapper Nas. It was released in October 1996 by Columbia Records as the second single from his second studio album, It Was Written (1996), following "If I Ruled the World (Imagine That)". "Street Dreams" contains an interpolation from the Eurythmics song "Sweet Dreams (Are Made of This)" and a sample from Linda Clifford's "Never Gonna Stop". A remix, including an appearance by R. Kelly, was released shortly after the original. It featured samples from The Isley Brothers' "Choosey Lover" along with some elements from Marvin Gaye's "Mercy Mercy Me." The remix version was performed live on an episode of the Nickelodeon series All That in February 1997.

The song's big-budget video, directed by Hype Williams, was an allusion to the Martin Scorsese film Casino. It was filmed in Las Vegas around the time Tupac Shakur was murdered and featured a cameo appearance by Frank Vincent. Famed actress and beauty pageant model Kenya Moore is also featured in the video.

The song was Nas's first to enter the top 40 on the Billboard Hot 100, reaching number 22. It also peaked at number 32 on the US Cash Box Top 100 and was certified Gold by the Recording Industry Association of America on January 8, 1997.

== Music video ==
There is a music video for both the original and the remix featuring R. Kelly. The original music video was directed by Hype Williams and was filmed in September 1996. It was released in the fall of 1996. The music video was released for the week ending on October 6, 1996. The video is an homage to Casino (film) and features Frank Vincent. The video contains an additional sample of Love Is Strange by Mickey & Sylvia, which can be heard at the beginning and at the end of the song.

== Live performances ==
Nas performed the song live at the American Music Awards of 1996 on January 27, 1997.

== Single track listing ==
=== A-Side ===
1. "Street Dreams" (Album Version) (4:08)
2. "Street Dreams" (Bonus Verse) (4:08)
3. "Street Dreams" (Instrumental) (4:08)

=== B-Side ===
1. "Affirmative Action" (Remix) (4:09)
  - Produced by Poke & Tone
2. "Affirmative Action" (Album Version) (4:19)
  - Produced by Dave Atkinson
3. "Affirmative Action" (Instrumental) (3:44)

== Charts ==
Chart (1996–97)	Peak position
Netherlands (Dutch Top 40 Tipparade)	20
New Zealand (Recorded Music NZ)	39
Scottish Singles Sales (Official Charts)	27
Sweden (Sverigetopplistan)	50
UK Singles (Official Charts)	12
UK Dance (Official Charts)	6
UK Hip Hop/R&B (Official Charts)	1
US Billboard Hot 100	22
US Dance Singles Sales (Billboard)	1
US Hot R&B/Hip-Hop Songs (Billboard)	18
US Hot Rap Songs (Billboard)	1
US Cash Box Top 100	32

== Certifications ==
Region	Certification	Certified units/sales
United States (RIAA)	Gold	500,000^{^}
^{^} Shipments figures based on certification alone.
