= Hit-Boy production discography =

Production discography of American record producer Hit-Boy

This is the production discography of American record producer Hit-Boy. It includes songs and recordings he has produced, co-produced, remixed or additionally produced, organized chronologically by release year.

== Singles produced ==
List of singles as either producer or co-producer, with selected chart positions and certifications, showing year released, performing artists and album name
Title	Year	Peak chart positions										Certifications	Album
Title	Year	US	US R&B	US Rap	AUS	CAN	GER	IRL	NZ	SWI	UK	Certifications	Album
"Stronger" (Mary J. Blige)	2009	—	84	—	—	—	—	—	—	—	—		More than a Game soundtrack
"Drop the World" (Lil Wayne featuring Eminem)	2010	18	—	—	56	24	—	43	—	—	51	RIAA: 5× Platinum; ARIA: Platinum	Rebirth
"Lay It on Me" (Kelly Rowland featuring Big Sean)	2011	109	43	—	—	—	—	—	—	—	69		Here I Am
"Niggas in Paris" (Kanye West and Jay-Z)	2011	5	1	1	66	16	40	22	38	43	10	RIAA: Diamond; ARIA: 2× Platinum; MC: Platinum	Watch the Throne
"Cold" (Kanye West featuring DJ Khaled)	2012	86	69	—	—	85	—	—	—	—	—	RIAA: Gold	Cruel Summer
"Goldie" (ASAP Rocky)	2012	—	55	—	—	—	—	—	—	—	98	RIAA: Platinum	Long. Live. ASAP
"1Train" (ASAP Rocky feat. Kendrick Lamar, Joey Badass, Yelawolf, Danny Brown, Action Bronson, & Big K.R.I.T.)	2012	—	31	—	—	—	—	—	—	—	—	RIAA: Gold	Long. Live. ASAP
"I Wish You Would" (DJ Khaled featuring Kanye West and Rick Ross)	2012	78	37	19	—	—	—	—	—	—	—		Kiss the Ring
"Clique" (Kanye West, Jay-Z and Big Sean)	2012	12	2	3	39	19	—	—	—	—	22	RIAA: 3× Platinum	Cruel Summer
"Backseat Freestyle" (Kendrick Lamar)	2013	106	29	22	—	—	—	—	—	—	79	RIAA: Platinum	Good Kid, M.A.A.D City
"Scream & Shout" (Remix) (will.i.am featuring Britney Spears, Lil Wayne, Waka Flocka Flame, Hit-Boy and Diddy)	2013	—	49	—	—	—	—	—	—	—	—		#willpower
"XO" (Beyoncé)	2014	45	—	—	16	36	72	27	10	—	37		BEYONCÉ
"Trophies" (Drake)	2014	50	13	5	—	—	—	—	—	—	—		Young Money: Rise of an Empire
"Sicko Mode" (Travis Scott)	2018	1	1	—	6	3	43	11	7	17	9	RIAA: Diamond; ARIA: 9× Platinum; CRIA: 9× Platinum; BVMI: Gold; RMNZ: 2× Platinum; BPI: 2× Platinum	Astroworld
"K-Town" (Jay Park)	2019	—	—	—	—	—	—	—	—	—	—		This Wasn't Supposed to Happen
"Bezerk" (Big Sean featuring ASAP Ferg & Hit-Boy)	2019	89	39	—	—	85	—	—	26	—	—	RIAA: Gold	Bezerk - Single
"Racks in the Middle" (Nipsey Hussle feat. Roddy Ricch & Hit-Boy)	2019	26	11	—	—	47	—	70	15	—	59	RIAA: Platinum; BPI: Silver; CRIA: Platinum	Racks in the Middle
"4 Thangs" (Freddie Gibbs featuring Big Sean and Hit-Boy)	2020	—	—	—	—	—	—	—	—	—	—		Soul Sold Separately
"What You Need" (Don Toliver)	2021	82	34	—	—	87	—	—	26	—	—	RIAA: Gold	Life of a Don
"Thique" (Beyoncé)	2022	—	—	—	—	—	—	—	—	—	—	RIAA: Gold	Renaissance
"Gunehgar" (Divine)	2022	—	—	—	—	—	—	—	—	—	—		Gunehgar
"Can't Get Enough" (Jennifer Lopez)	2024	—	—	—	—	—	—	—	—	—	—		This Is Me... Now
"—" denotes a recording that did not chart or was not released in that territory.

== 2007 ==
=== Jennifer Lopez - Brave ===
- 2. "Forever" (produced with The Clutch and Cory Rooney)

=== Gucci Mane - Back to the Trap House ===
- 4. "I Know Why" (featuring Pimp C, Rich Boy and Blaze-1) (produced with Butta, Polow da Don, and Rio the Superproducer)

== 2008 ==
=== Snoop Dogg - Ego Trippin' ===
- 20. "Why Did You Leave Me" (featuring Chilly Chil) (produced with Polow da Don)

=== Flo Rida - Mail on Sunday ===
- 6. "Priceless" (featuring Birdman) (produced with Chase N. Cashe)

=== Tiffany Evans - Tiffany Evans ===
- 6. "Lay Back & Chill" (produced with B. Carr and Chase N. Cashe)

=== G-Unit - T·O·S (Terminate on Sight) ===
- 10. "Kitty Kat"

=== The Pussycat Dolls - Doll Domination ===
- 14. "Love the Way You Love Me" (produced with Chase N. Cashe and DioGuardi)

=== Brandy - Human ===
- 14. "1st & Love" (produced with Chase N. Cashe)

== 2009 ==
=== Mary J. Blige - Stronger with Each Tear ===
- 11. "Stronger" (from motion picture More than a Game) (produced with Polow da Don)

== 2010 ==
=== Lil Wayne - Rebirth ===
- 8. "Drop the World" (featuring Eminem) (produced with Chase N. Cashe)

=== Dom Kennedy - From the Westside, With Love ===
- 2. "Still Me"
- 6. "The 4 Heartbeats" (featuring Overdoz)

=== Latif - Love Is Love ===
- 13. "Rock It"

=== Macy Gray - The Sellout ===
- 1. "The Sellout" (produced with Chase N. Cashe)
- 11. "On & On" (produced with Don Cannon)

=== Kanye West - GOOD Fridays ===
- "Christmas in Harlem" (featuring Cam'ron, Jim Jones, Vado, Cyhi the Prynce, Pusha T, Musiq Soulchild, Teyana Taylor and Big Sean)

== 2011 ==
=== Casey Veggies - Sleeping in Class ===
- 16. "I Be Over Shit"

=== Dom Kennedy - The Original Dom Kennedy ===
- 8. "Can't Let Go"
- 9. "CDC" (featuring Casey Veggies and Carter)

=== Bobby V - Fly on the Wall ===
- 13. "Outfit" (featuring Cyhi Da Prynce) (produced with B. Carr of Surf Club)

=== Jennifer Hudson - I Remember Me ===
- 6. "Gone" (produced with Polow da Don and Harvey Mason Jr.)

=== Smoke DZA - The Hustler's Catalog ===
- 12. "How Far We Go (Uptown 81)" (featuring Kendrick Lamar)

=== Kelly Rowland - Here I Am ===
- 4. "Lay It on Me" (featuring Big Sean)

=== JAY-Z and Kanye West - Watch the Throne ===
- 3. "Niggas in Paris" (produced with Kanye West, Mike Dean, and Anthony Kilhoffer)

=== Kid Ink - Wheels Up ===
- 14. "On My Own"

=== Wale - The Eleven One Eleven Theory ===
- 17. "Underdogg"

=== The Game - The R.E.D. Album ===
- 9. "The Good, the Bad, the Ugly"

=== Joe Jonas - Fastlife ===
- 11. "Lighthouse" (produced with Chris Brown)

=== Pusha T - Fear of God II: Let Us Pray ===
- 10. "My God" (produced with Deezy)

=== Rihanna - Talk That Talk ===
- 10. "Watch n' Learn" (produced with Kuk Harrell)

== 2012 ==
=== The Wrldfms Tony Williams - King or the Fool ===
- 16. "I Know You Missed It" (featuring John Legend)

=== Nicki Minaj - Pink Friday: Roman Reloaded ===
- 2. "Come on a Cone"
- 3. "I Am Your Leader" (featuring Cam'ron and Rick Ross)

=== Justin Bieber - Believe ===
- 6. "Right Here" (featuring Drake) (produced with Kuk Harrell)

=== 50 Cent - 5 (Murder by Numbers) ===
- 4. "Business Mind" (featuring Hayes)

=== T.I. - Fucc da City Up ===
- 14. "Harry Potter"

=== Starlito - Post Traumatic Stress ===
- 9. "Nightmares Pt. 2"

=== Sir Michael Rocks - Lap of Lux ===
- 14. "You Know What"

=== Hit-Boy - HITstory ===
- 1. "HITstory" (produced with Hanine)
- 2. "Brake Lights"
- 3. "Option" (featuring Big Sean) (produced with Rey Reel)
- 4. "Old School Caddy" (featuring Kid Cudi)
- 5. "Fan"
- 6. "She Belongs to the City"
- 11. "Running in Place" (featuring Stacy Barthe)

=== DJ Khaled - Kiss the Ring ===
- 3. "I Wish You Would" (featuring Kanye West and Rick Ross)

=== Slaughterhouse - On the House ===
- 8. "Where Sinners Dwell"

=== Tyga - Well Done 3 ===
- 9. "King Company" (featuring Honey Cocaine)

=== Slaughterhouse - Welcome to: Our House ===
- 3. "Coffin" (featuring Busta Rhymes) (produced with Eminem)

=== Big Sean - Detroit ===
- 16. "Once Bitten, Twice Shy" (produced with M3rge)

=== GOOD Music - Cruel Summer ===
- 2. "Clique" (featuring Kanye West, Jay-Z and Big Sean) (produced with Kanye West, Anthony Kilhoffer, and Noah Goldstein)
- 6. "Cold" (featuring Kanye West and DJ Khaled)
- 7. "Higher" (featuring The-Dream, Pusha T, Mase and Cocaine 80s) (produced with Kanye West and Mike Dean)

=== DJ Drama - Quality Street Music ===
- 10. "My Way" (featuring Common, Lloyd, and Kendrick Lamar)

=== Kendrick Lamar - Good Kid, M.A.A.D City ===
- 3. "Backseat Freestyle"

=== Keyshia Cole - Woman to Woman ===
- 17. "Wonder"

== 2013 ==
=== ASAP Rocky - Long. Live. ASAP ===
- 2. "Goldie"
- 9. "1 Train" (featuring Kendrick Lamar, Joey Badass, Yelawolf, Danny Brown, Action Bronson and Big K.R.I.T.)

=== HS87 - All I've Ever Dreamed Of ===
- 8. "Cypher" (featuring Audio Push, Hit-Boy, Kent M$ney, B Mac the Queen, Schoolboy Q, Casey Veggies, Xzibit, Rick Ross, Method Man, Redman, and Raekwon)
- 11. "Make Something" (featuring K. Roosevelt, Hit-Boy, Kent M$ney, and Common)

=== Kid Cudi - Indicud ===
- 10. "Red Eye" (featuring Haim) (produced with Kid Cudi)

=== K. Roosevelt - RoseGold ===
- 6. "Point of Impact"

=== Kent M$ney - Eyes Wide Shut ===
- 2. "God Bless"
- 6. "I Know"
- 10. "Think About It" (featuring Nicka)

=== Jay-Z - Magna Carta Holy Grail ===
- 7. "Somewhereinamerica" (produced with Hey DJ Camper and Mike Dean)

=== John Legend - Love in the Future ===
(Tracks produced with Kanye West and Dave Tozer)

- 2. "The Beginning..."
- 16. "Caught Up"

=== Audio Push - Come As You Are ===
- 2. "Come As You Are" (produced with Key Wane and Mars1500)
- 4. "I Like It" (featuring K. Roosevelt) (produced with S. Dot and Mars1500)
- 7. "Tis the Season" (featuring Joey Badass)
- 11. "Told You So / Block Party" (featuring Overdoz and Hit-Boy)
- 12. "Club 380" (produced with HazeBanga)
- 13. "Anything Goes" (featuring Wale) (produced with HazeBanga)
- 14. "Do It All" (featuring James Fauntleroy and Vic Mensa) (produced with HazeBanga and Eric Choice)

=== Maybach Music Group - Self Made Vol. 3 ===
- 11. "What Ya Used To" (Rockie Fresh featuring Hit-Boy)

=== Vic Mensa - Innanetape ===
- 14. "That Nigga"

=== M.I.A. - Matangi ===
- 4. "Warriors"
- 9. "Boom Skit" (produced with HazeBanga)
- 15. "Sexodus" (featuring The Weeknd) (produced with HazeBanga)
- 16. "Like This" (produced with HazeBanga)

=== Lil Bibby - Free Crack ===
- 11. "Whole Crew" (produced with Rey Reel)

=== Beyoncé - Beyoncé ===
(All tracks produced with Beyoncé)

- 7. "Jealous" (produced with Detail, The Order, Boots, HazeBanga, and Dre Moon)
- 10. "XO" (additional production; primary production by Ryan Tedder, The-Dream, and Beyoncé)
- 11. "Flawless" (featuring Chimamanda Ngozi Adichie) (produced with Rey Reel, HazeBanga, and Boots)
- 18. "Ring Off" (produced with Mike Caren, Cook Classics, HazeBanga, Preach Bal4, Mike Dean, Ariel Rechtshaid, and Derek Dixie)

=== Casey Veggies and Rockie Fresh - Fresh Veggies ===
(Tracks produced with HazeBanga)

- 4. "I Been Workin'"
- 8. "Circle"

== 2014 ==
=== Mariah Carey - Me. I Am Mariah... The Elusive Chanteuse ===
(All tracks produced with Mariah Carey)

- 3. "Dedicated" (featuring Nas) (produced with Darhyl "Hey DJ" Camper and HazeBanga)
- 5. "Thirsty" (produced with Rey Reel)
- 12. "Money ($ * / ...)" (featuring Fabolous)

=== HS87 - We the Plug ===
- 1. "Plug Music" (produced with K. Roosevelt, Rey Reel, and WondaGurl)
- 2. "Stripes"
- 3. "No Talkin'" (produced with HazeBanga)
- 5. "On Everything"
- 7. "Rude Awakening"
- 8. "The Pay" (produced with Rey Reel)
- 9. "Shit Shit"
- 11. "Scorn" (produced with HazeBanga and Cairo Mayeson)
- 12. "Picture" (produced with K. Roosevelt and HazeBanga)
- 13. "Members Only" (produced with K. Roosevelt, HazeBanga, and Don Cannon)
- 15. "Parade" (produced with Peter Cottontale)
- 17. "B.B.H." (produced with HazeBanga and Cairo Mayeson)
- 18. "Grindin' My Whole Life" (produced with HazeBanga and Rey Reel)
- 19. "Alert" (produced with HazeBanga)

=== Young Money Entertainment - Young Money: Rise of an Empire ===
- 2. "Trophies" - Drake

=== Nicki Minaj - The Pinkprint ===
- 5. "Feeling Myself" (featuring Beyoncé) (produced with Beyoncé)

=== Nipsey Hussle - Mailbox Money ===
- 2. "A Hunnit a Show" (featuring Rick Ross)

== 2015 ==
=== Joey Badass - B4.Da.$$ ===
- 8. "Belly of the Beast" (featuring Chronixx)

=== Audio Push - The Good Vibe Tribe ===
- 3. "Reppin"
- 4. "Ask Me" (produced with Rey Reel)
- 6. "Normally" (produced with Dot da Genius)
- 9. "Sweep" (produced with Cardo)
- 12. "Mind Trap" (featuring Vince Staples and Casey Veggies) (produced with Preach)

=== Sevyn Streeter - Shoulda Been There, Pt. 1 ===
- 8. "Boomerang" (featuring Hit-Boy)

=== Rich the Kid - Flexin on Purpose ===
- 7. "Where the Cash At"

=== Puff Daddy - MMM (Money Making Mitch) ===
- 8. "All or Nothing" (featuring French Montana & Wiz Khalifa) (co-produced by The Mekanics)
- 9. "Workin'" (featuring Travi$ Scott and Big Sean) (co-produced by Key Wane)

=== Casey Veggies - Live & Grow ===
- 6. "Wonderful" (featuring Ty Dolla Sign)

=== Stacy Barthe - BEcoming ===
- 1. "My Suicide Note (Intro)" (produced with Malay)

=== Selena Gomez - Revival ===
(All tracks produced with Rock Mafia)

- 1. "Revival" (produced with Dubkiller)
- 10. "Body Heat"
- 11. "Rise"

=== Fabri Fibra - Squallor ===
- 17. "Non Me Ne Frega Un Cazzo" (featuring Madman & Gemitaiz) (produced with Rey Reel)
- "Alieno" (produced with HazeBanga)

=== The Game - The Documentary 2 ===
- 11. "Dedicated" (featuring Future and Sonyae) (produced with Bongo)

=== Ty Dolla Sign - Free TC ===
- 9. "Guard Down" (featuring Kanye West and Diddy)

== 2016 ==
=== Rihanna - Anti ===
(Tracks produced with Travis Scott and Kuk Harrell)

- 6. "Woo"
- 15. "Pose"

=== Santigold - 99¢ ===
- 2. "Big Boss Big Time Business" (produced with HazeBanga and Batmanglij)

=== Chloe x Halle - Sugar Symphony ===
- 2. "Red Lights" (produced with HazeBanga)

=== Rockie Fresh - The Night I Went To... Los Angeles ===
- 2. "All I Want"

=== Beyoncé - Lemonade ===
- 4. "Sorry" (produced with Beyoncé, MeLo-X, Diana Gordon, HazeBanga, and Stuart White)

=== Casey Veggies - Customized Greatly Vol. 4: The Return of the Boy ===
- 13. "Take Me Where It's Love (Searching Pt. 2)"

=== YG - Still Brazy ===
- 17. "Police Get Away wit Murder"

=== Travis Scott - Birds in the Trap Sing McKnight ===
- 2. "Way Back" (produced with Cashmere Cat, Honorable C.N.O.T.E., Rogét Chahayed, and Mike Dean)

=== Audio Push - 90951 ===
- 2. "Leftside"
- 6. "Praise You" (featuring Musiq Soulchild)
- 7. "Slow Motion" (featuring BJ the Chicago Kid)
- 8. "Play Action" (featuring Hit-Boy)

=== Ty Dolla Sign - Campaign ===
- 5. "3 Wayz" (featuring Travis Scott) (produced with Mike Dean and HazeBanga)

== 2017 ==
=== Syd - Fin ===
- 1. "Shake Em Off"

=== Jidenna - The Chief ===
- 7. "2 Points" (produced with Nana Kwabena and Andrew Horowitz)

=== Half-A-Mil - Half-A-Mil 2 ===
- All tracks

=== Dom Kennedy and Hit-Boy - Courtesy of Half-a-Mil ===
- All tracks

=== OverDoz. - 2008 ===
- 7. "Rich White Friends"

=== Playboi Carti - Playboi Carti ===
- 8. "Other Shit"

=== Jimmy Wopo - Jordan Kobe ===
- 17. "All My Life"

=== Mary J. Blige - Strength of a Woman ===
- 14. "Hello Father"

=== ASAP Mob - Cozy Tapes Vol. 2: Too Cozy ===
- 11. "Frat Rules" (featuring ASAP Rocky, Playboi Carti and Big Sean) (produced with Southside)
- 13. "Feels So Good" (featuring ASAP Rocky, ASAP Ferg, ASAP Nast, ASAP Twelvyy and ASAP Ant) (produced with Frank Dukes)

=== Eminem - Revival ===
- 13. "Nowhere Fast" (featuring Kehlani) (produced with Rock Mafia)

== 2018 ==
=== Tinashe - Joyride ===
- 2. "Joyride" (produced with Allen Ritter)

=== Jay Rock - Redemption ===
- 11. "Wow Freestyle" (featuring Kendrick Lamar) (produced with G Dav)

=== Bebe Rexha - Expectations ===
- 9. "Mine" (produced with Devon Corey)

=== Travis Scott - Astroworld ===
(Tracks produced with Rogét Chahayed and Mike Dean)

- 2. "Carousel"
- 3. "Sicko Mode" (produced with OZ, Tay Keith, and Cubeatz)

=== Ariana Grande - Sweetener ===
- 12. "Better Off" (produced with Tommy Brown and Brian Malik Baptiste)

=== Machine Gun Kelly - Binge ===
- 7. "Signs" (featuring 24hrs)

=== MadeinTYO - Sincerely, Tokyo ===
- 6. "Lil Bih" (featuring 24hrs)

=== Hit-Boy - Tony Fontana ===
- All tracks

=== 24hrs - Houses on the Hill ===
- 1. "Family & Money"
- 2. "7AM in Beverly" (featuring Dom Kennedy)
- 3. "Not Always Right" (featuring Hit-Boy)
- 6. "Fifty Ball" (featuring Moneybagg Yo and Smokepurpp)
- 7. "Champagne" (featuring MadeinTYO)
- 9. "Police" (featuring Jay305)
- 10. "Contagious"
- 11. "Love" (featuring Vic Mensa)
- 12. "Stay 2 Myself"

=== Meek Mill - Championships ===
- 15. "100 Summers"

== 2019 ==
=== Kehlani - While We Wait ===
- 3. "Nunya" (featuring Dom Kennedy) (produced with G Dav and Teddy Walton)

=== Juice Wrld - Death Race for Love ===
- 3. "HeMotions"
- 7. "Big"
- 15. "Out My Way"
- 16. "The Bees Knees" (produced with No I.D. and G. Ry)
- 20. "She's the One"

=== Khalid - Free Spirit ===
- 14. "Self"

=== Tinashe - Songs for You ===
- "Feelings" (produced with Hitmaka and Smash David)

=== Q Da Fool ===
- "Playoffs" (featuring Maxo Kream)

=== Hit-Boy and SOB X RBE - Family Not a Group ===
- All tracks
  - 3. "Stuck in the Streets" (produced with Chase N. Cashe)
  - 4. "Family Not a Group" (produced with G Dav)
  - 5. "Can't Fold" (produced with G. Ry and JayB)

=== YG - 4Real 4Real ===
- 10. "Do Not Disturb" (featuring Kamaiyah and G-Eazy) (produced with Corbett)

=== Wynne - If I May... ===
- 2. "Rose City"

=== Nas - The Lost Tapes 2 ===
- 6. "Royalty" (featuring RaVaughn)

=== Ameer Vann - Emmanuel ===
- 4. "Los Angeles"
- 6. "Plastic"

=== Jay Park and Hit-Boy - This Wasn't Supposed to Happen ===
- All tracks
  - 3. "K-Town" (produced with G. Ry)
  - 4. "Fade Away" (produced with G. Ry)
  - 6. "Killa" (produced with G. Ry)

=== Nipsey Hussle - Non-album single ===
- "Racks in the Middle" (featuring Roddy Ricch & Hit-Boy)

=== Zhavia Ward - 17 ===
- 1. "17"
- 5. "EZ"

=== Wale - Wow... That's Crazy ===
- 12. "50 in da Safe" (featuring Pink $weatz)

== 2020 ==
=== Hit-Boy - The Chauncey Hollis Project ===
- All tracks

=== Dom Kennedy and Hit-Boy - Also Known As ===
- All tracks

=== Mick Jenkins - The Circus ===
- 1. "Same Ol"

=== Tee Grizzley ===
- "Red Light"

=== Lil Baby - My Turn ===
- 15. "Catch the Sun"

=== Jay Electronica - A Written Testimony ===
- 3. "The Blinding" (featuring Travis Scott) (produced with Swizz Beatz, AraabMuzik, and G. Ry)

=== Polo G - The Goat ===
- 4. "Flex" (featuring Juice Wrld) (produced with Corbett)

=== Wafia - Good Things ===
- 4. "Flowers & Superpowers" (produced with Rogét Chahayed)

=== Casey Veggies and Rockie Fresh - Fresh Veggies 2 ===
- 14. "Miss My Dogs" (featuring Hit-Boy) (produced with G. Ry)

=== Kyle - See You When I Am Famous ===
- 1. "Bouncin"

=== Davido - A Better Time ===
- 14. "Birthday Cake" (featuring Nas & Hit-Boy)

=== Big Sean - Detroit 2 ===
- 1. "Why Would I Stop?" (produced with Rogét Chahayed)
- 2. "Lucky Me" (produced with DJ Dahi, Rogét Chahayed, and Teddy Walton)
- 3. "Deep Reverence" (featuring Nipsey Hussle) (produced with G Ry, Rogét Chahayed, Audio Anthem, and Johan Lenox)
- 10. "Guard Your Heart" (featuring Anderson .Paak, Earlly Mac and Wale) (produced with Corbett and Rogét Chahayed)
- 11. "Respect It" (featuring Young Thug and Hit-Boy) (produced with G Dav and Corbett)
- 12. "Lithuania" (featuring Travis Scott) (produced with Audio Anthem)
- 18. "Don Life" (featuring Lil Wayne) (produced with Key Wane, Amaire Johnson, Aaron Bow, Johan Lenox, and Teddy Walton)
- 19. "Friday Night Cypher" (featuring Tee Grizzley, Kash Doll, Cash Kidd, Payroll, 42 Dugg, Boldy James, Drego, Sada Baby, Royce da 5'9" and Eminem) (produced with Key Wane, Jay John Henry, and Helluva)
- 23. "Overtime" (produced with Key Wane and The Tucker Brothers)
- 25. "Bezerk" (featuring ASAP Ferg and Hit-Boy) (produced with G Dav and Corbett)

=== Brandy - B7 ===
- 12. "Baby Mama" (featuring Chance the Rapper) (produced with Brandy and LaShawn Daniels)

=== Nas - King's Disease ===
- All tracks
  - 1. "King's Disease" (produced with Corbett, J. Pelham, Pat Junior, and Cyanca)
  - 2. "Blue Benz" (produced with Penthouse Parti and Rogét Chahayed)
  - 4. "Ultra Black" (featuring Hit-Boy) (produced with Audio Anthem and Corbett)
  - 5. "27 Summers" (produced with Rogét Chahayed)
  - 6. "Replace Me" (featuring Big Sean and Don Toliver) (produced with HazeBanga and Eric Choice)
  - 8. "All Bad" (featuring Anderson .Paak) (produced with Dwayne "MonoNeon" Thomas Jr.)
  - 10. "Full Circle" (featuring The Firm) (produced with G. Ry)

=== Conway the Machine - From King to a God ===
- 2. "Fear of God" (featuring DeJ Loaf)

=== ASAP Ferg - Floor Seats II ===
- 5. "Mask" (featuring Antha Pantha)

=== Benny the Butcher - Burden of Proof ===
- All tracks
  - 4. "One Way Flight" (featuring Freddie Gibbs) (produced with Jansport J)
  - 7. "New Streets" (produced with Jansport J)
  - 9. "Trade It All" (produced with Corbett)
  - 12. "Legend" (with Hit-Boy) (produced with G. Ry)

=== Ty Dolla Sign - Featuring Ty Dolla Sign ===
- 3. "Temptations" (featuring Kid Cudi) (produced with Skrillex)

=== Jack Harlow - Thats What They All Say ===
- 1. "Rendezvous" (produced with Khirye Tyler)

== 2021 ==
=== Various artists - Judas and the Black Messiah: The Inspired Album ===
- (Executive producer; produced multiple tracks)

=== Sada Baby - Skuba Sada 2.5 ===
- 8. "Little While" (featuring Big Sean)

=== Buddy - Gully (Original Motion Picture Soundtrack) ===
- 1. "Murderer"

=== Paloma Mami - Sueños de Dalí ===
- 4. "Frenesí"

=== Tee Grizzley - Built for Whatever ===
- 4. "In My Feelings" (featuring Quavo and Young Dolph)
- 9. "Evictions"
- 15. "What We On" (featuring Big Sean)

=== H.E.R. - Back of My Mind ===
- 3. "Trauma" (with Hit-Boy featuring Cordae)

=== Nas - King's Disease II ===
- All tracks
  - 1. "The Pressure" (produced with Corbett)
  - 2. "Death Row East" (produced with Corbett)
  - 4. "EPMD 2" (featuring Eminem and EPMD) (produced with Eminem)
  - 5. "Rare" (produced with Corbett)
  - 6. "YKTV" (featuring A Boogie wit da Hoodie and YG) (produced with Corbett)
  - 7. "Store Run" (produced with Ezreaux)
  - 8. "Moments" (produced with Jansport J)
  - 9. "Nobody" (featuring Ms. Lauryn Hill) (produced with Corbett)
  - 10. "No Phony Love" (featuring Charlie Wilson) (produced with Jansport J and Brian Alexander Morgan)
  - 11. "Brunch on Sundays" (featuring Blxst) (produced with Corbett and Rogét Chahayed)
  - 12. "Count Me In" (produced with B. Carr)
  - 13. "Composure" (featuring Hit-Boy) (produced with Rogét Chahayed)

=== Babyface Ray ===
- "It Ain't My Fault" (with Hit-Boy and Big Sean)

=== G-Eazy - These Things Happen Too ===
- 8. "Solar Eclipse"

=== Don Toliver - Life of a Don ===
- 5. "What You Need" (produced with Corbett and Sir Dylan)

=== Dom Kennedy - From the Westside with Love Three ===
- 1. "Still Grind'n"
- 2. "Don't Walk Away"
- 5. "Good Lookin"

=== Maxo Kream - Weight of the World ===
- 13. "Greener Knots"

=== Big Sean and Hit-Boy - What You Expect ===
- All tracks
  - 2. "Into It" (produced with G Dav)
  - 3. "The One" (produced with Oz and Jesse Blum)
  - 4. "Loyal to a Fault" (featuring Bryson Tiller and Lil Durk) (produced with Rogét Chahayed, Don Cannon, G. Ry, Brvyn, PittThaKid, and Ace G.)
  - 5. "Offense" (featuring Babyface Ray and 42 Dugg) (produced with G Dav, Rogét Chahayed, and Jesse Blum)
  - 6. "What a Life" (produced with G. Ry, Rogét Chahayed, and Carter Lang)

=== Nardo Wick - Who Is Nardo Wick? ===
- 8. "Power" (featuring Hit-Boy) (produced with Corbett)

=== Terrace Martin - DRONES ===
- 9. "Griots of the Crenshaw District" (with Kamasi Washington, Robert Glasper & Hit-Boy) (produced with Terrace Martin)

=== Nas ===
- "Life Is Like" (featuring Freddie Gibbs & Cordae)
- "Big Nas" (Original Song from Masterclass)

=== Russ - Chomp 2 ===
- 9. "Note to Self" (featuring Big Sean, Hit-Boy, Joey Badass, and Wale)

=== Nas - Magic ===
- All tracks
  - 3. "Ugly" (produced with Corbett)

== 2022 ==
=== Pacman da Gunman and Hit-Boy - Bulletproof Soul ===
- All tracks

=== Cordae - From a Birds Eye View ===
- 9. "Sinister" (featuring Lil Wayne) (produced with Audio Anthem)

=== Cordae - "Checkmate" ===
- "Checkmate" (single)

=== 2 Chainz - Dope Don't Sell Itself ===
- 4. "Outstanding" (featuring Roddy Ricch) (produced with Corbett and G. Ry)

=== Dreezy and Hit-Boy - HITGIRL ===
- All tracks

=== Snoop Dogg - BODR ===
- 5. "Conflicted" (featuring Nas)
- 6. "Daddy" (featuring Emo Trap)
- 10. "House I Built"
- 12. "Jerseys in the Rafters" (featuring The Game)

=== Conway the Machine - God Don't Make Mistakes ===
- 5. "Wild Chapters" (featuring T.I. and Novel)

=== Beyoncé - Renaissance ===
- 12. "Thique" (produced with Beyoncé, LilJuMadeDaBeat, Stuart White, and Ink)

=== Doechii - She / Her / Black Bitch ===
- 4. "This Bitch Matters" (produced with Kal Banx)

=== The Game - "Violence" ===
- "Violence" (non-album single)

=== The Game - Drillmatic – Heart vs. Mind ===
- 2. "Eazy" (with Kanye West) (produced with Mike Dean, Cash Jones, and Big Duke)
- 9. "Change the Game" (featuring Ty Dolla Sign)
- 10. "How Far I Came" (featuring Roddy Ricch)
- 19. "Drake with the Braids (Interlude)"
- 24. "The Black Slim Shady" (produced with Big Duke and Brian King Joseph)
- 25. "Stupid" (featuring Big Sean)
- 30. "A Father's Prayer"

=== YG - I Got Issues ===
- 4. "Maniac" (produced with Corbett)

=== Madden NFL 23 ===
- Created 33 exclusive beats for the game's cinematics.
- "Checkmate" (with Cordae)

=== Freddie Gibbs - Soul Sold Separately ===
- 17. "4 Thangs" (featuring Big Sean and Hit-Boy)

=== Divine - Gunehgar ===
- 1. "Gunehgar"
- 11. "Flex Kar"

=== Ab-Soul - Herbert ===
- 13. "Fallacy" (feat. Alemeda)

=== Nas - King's Disease III ===
- All tracks
  - 11. "WTF SMH" (produced with Jansport J)
  - 12. "Once a Man, Twice a Child" (produced with C3 Official)

== 2023 ==
=== Buddy & Kent Jamz - House Party (Soundtrack) ===
- 2. "House Party" (produced with Corbett & OAK)

=== Don Toliver - Love Sick ===
- 5. "Go Down" (featuring TisaKorean) (produced with Corbett and TisaKorean)
- 14. "Bus Stop" (featuring Brent Faiyaz) (produced with 206derek, Brent Faiyaz, and Dpat)

=== Travis Scott - Utopia ===
- 9. "Delresto (Echoes)" (featuring Beyoncé) (produced with Travis Scott, Beyoncé, Mike Dean, and Allen Ritter)

=== Blxst - Creed III (soundtrack) ===
- 6. "Just Face It" (produced with Corbett & Rondeaux)

=== Ski Mask the Slump God - They Cloned Tyrone (soundtrack) ===
- 5. "Constellation" (produced with Corbett)

=== Musiq Soulchild and Hit-Boy - Victims & Villains ===
- All tracks

=== Hit-Boy - Surf or Drown ===
- All tracks
  - 8. "Slipping Into Darkness" (featuring The Alchemist) (produced with The Alchemist)

=== Hit-Boy and Big Hit - Surf or Drown, Vol. 2 ===
- All tracks

=== Nas - Magic 2 ===
- All tracks

=== Nas - Magic 3 ===
- All tracks

=== Big Hit - The Truth Is in My Eyes ===
- 1. "The Truth Is in My Eyes"
- 2. "Red Lotion" (feat. RJmrLA & Jay Worthy) (produced with Corbett)
- 4. "Take Some off of That" (produced with Rogét Chahayed)
- 5. "Extra Clips"
- 6. "Wigglin'" (featuring Mozzy) (produced with Deezy)
- 7. "Broke the Mold" (produced with Rogét Chahayed)
- 8. "A$VP Chauncey" (featuring Hit-Boy) (produced with Corbett)
- 9. "Boo Bop" (produced with Rogét Chahayed)
- 10. "Shoppin' Monster" (featuring Snoop Dogg) (produced with Corbett)
- 12. "Breaking the Ice" (feat. Musiq Soulchild, Dom Kennedy, & J. Stone) (produced with Johnathan Hulett)
- 13. "The Pain Is Deep" (produced with Corbett)
- 14. "Inspiration" (feat. Figg Newton & Killa Twan)
- 15. "Speaking in Codes" (featuring Benny the Butcher) (produced with Jesse Blum)
- 16. "Stay On" (feat. Tray Deee) (produced with NextWavez)
- 17. "G'z Don't Cry"

=== Madden NFL 24 (video game) ===
- Cinematic score contribution

== 2024 ==
=== Jennifer Lopez - This Is Me... Now ===
- 4. "Can't Get Enough"

=== Usher - Coming Home ===
- "Bop" (produced with The-Dream)

=== Rosecrans Vic and Hit-Boy - "Moscow" ===
- "Moscow" (featuring Spank Nitti James, Big Hit and HitgirlLENA)

=== Hit-Boy and The Alchemist - Theodore and Andre ===
- All tracks

=== The Game and Big Hit - Paisley Dreams ===
- All tracks
  - 3. "P Fiction" (featuring Hit-Boy) (produced with Audio Anthem)
  - 5. "Cutthroat" (featuring TeeFLii) (produced with Nextwavez)
  - 7. "Crisis" (featuring Dom Kennedy) (produced with Jansport J)

=== BlueBucksClan and Hit-Boy - Biggest Out the West ===
- All tracks

=== Kyle - SMYLE AGAIN ===
- 15. "Dirty" (with Hit-Boy) (produced with Johnathan Hulett)

=== Benny the Butcher - Everybody Can't Go ===
- 2. "Bron"
- 4. "Everybody Can't Go" (with Kyle Banks) (produced with Corbett)
- 6. "Back Again" (with Snoop Dogg)
- 7. "One Foot In" (with Stove God Cooks)
- 9. "Pillow Talk & Slander" (with Jadakiss and Babyface Ray)
- 10. "How to Rap"
- 12. "Big Tymers" (with Peezy)

=== Rapsody - Please Don't Cry ===
- 3. "Asteroids" (produced with Corbett)

=== Beyoncé - Cowboy Carter ===
- 5. "Texas Hold 'Em" (additional production and synthesizer)

=== Big Sean - Better Me Than You ===
- 2. "Iconic" (produced with Chahayed, Beam, Hulett, Jasper Harris, Regier, Nami, Levesque, Berg, Otxhell, Bnyx, Beker, Allen Kane)
- 13. "This n That" (with Bryson Tiller & Kodak Black) (produced with Corbett)
- 14. "Million Pieces" (with Teyana Taylor, Larry June and DJ Premier) (produced with Big Sean & Beker)

=== Maxo Kream - Personification ===
- 6. "Smokey" (with BigXthaPlug)

=== Musiq Soulchild ===
- "October 31st" (with Hit-Boy, featuring Dave East) (standalone single)

=== Kurtis Blow & Hit-Boy ===
- "Basketball 2.0" (with Lola Brooke)

=== Hit-Boy and The Alchemist and Big Hit - Black & Whites ===
- All tracks

=== Hit-Boy and LaRusselll - Rent Due ===
- All tracks (released early on EVEN on February 7, 2024; wide release February 23, 2024)

=== Jay 305 and Hit-Boy - DONT WAIT UNTIL I DIE ===
- All tracks

== 2025 ==
=== Hit-Boy and LaRusselll - Rent Paid ===
- All tracks

=== Hit-Boy and Spank Nitti James - High-Class Wiggler ===
- All tracks

=== Hit-Boy - "What's the Deal?" ===
- "What's the Deal?"

=== Hit-Boy and Peezy - "Wheel of Fortune" ===
- "Wheel of Fortune"

=== Hit-Boy, Spank Nitti James, BabyTron and AZ Chike - "Start Dissin'" ===
- "Start Dissin'" (produced with Scott Storch)

=== TiaCorine - Corinian ===
- "Backyard" (featuring JID)

=== 03 Greedo - Another Night Out ===
- "Somebody" (with Hit-Boy) (produced with Whokid Woody)

=== Hit-Boy and The Alchemist - Goldfish ===
- All tracks (all tracks produced by Hit-Boy and The Alchemist)
  - 1. "Doing My Best"
  - 2. "Business Merger"
  - 3. "Show Me The Way"
  - 4. "Mick & Cooley" (featuring Conway the Machine)
  - 5. "Ask For Me"
  - 6. "Ricky"
  - 7. "Groupie Love"
  - 8. "Celebration Moments" (featuring Havoc)
  - 9. "Home Improvement"
  - 10. "Recent Memory"
  - 11. "Walk In Faith"
  - 12. "Not Much" (featuring Boldy James)
  - 13. "Drawing Bridges" (featuring Johnathan Hulett)
  - 14. "All Gas No Breaks" (featuring Jay Worthy and Big Hit)
  - 15. "God Is Great"

=== Hit-Boy and Spank Nitti James - Yeast Talkin' ===
- All tracks
- A deluxe edition, Yeast Talkin' (Deluxe), was released on February 13, 2026.

=== Lefty Gunplay, Hit-Boy and Big Hit - "Think He Me" ===
- "Think He Me" (featuring X4 and FBEAT) (released December 26, 2025)

=== Jay Worthy - Once Upon a Time ===
- 12. "True Story" (with Ty $)

=== Jay Electronica - Power at the Rate of My Dream ===
- 3. "Best Wishes" (with Hit-Boy and Westside Gunn)

== 2026 ==
=== Hit-Boy - "Crow Bars" ===
- "Crow Bars"

=== A$AP Rocky - Don't Be Dumb ===
- "Stay Here 4 Life" (featuring Brent Faiyaz) (produced with Brent Faiyaz, Loukeman, Rance and Thundercat)

=== Bebe Rexha - Dirty Blonde ===
- 4. "$.H.I.T" (produced with Jesse Blum)

=== Hit-Boy - "Block Party" ===
- "Block Party"

=== Lizzo and Sexyy Red - "HOES" ===
- "HOES" (from the Scary Movie 6 soundtrack)

=== Hit-Boy - HITstory 2: Success Is a Dirty Word ===
All tracks produced by Hit-Boy.

- 1. "Intro"
- 2. "Success Is a Dirty Word"
- 3. "Clash"
- 4. "Do It" (featuring Quavo)
- 5. "Friday" (featuring Dom Kennedy)
- 6. "S&V" (featuring Jazze Pha)
- 7. "Franchise Boy"
- 8. "Can't Ignore It"
- 9. "National TV"
- 10. "High Speed Chase"
- 11. "American Pie"
- 12. "Talk Nice to Me"
- 13. "Love Story"
- 14. "New Money"
- 15. "Stitched Lip" (featuring Chase N. Cashe and Johnathan Hulett)
- 16. "Doin' a Look" (featuring Ty Dolla Sign and Ab-Soul)
- 17. "Watch It Come True" (featuring James Fauntleroy)

=== AZ Chike - "Packed Up" ===
- "Packed Up"

=== Hit-Boy - non-album singles ===
- "Who Knows"
- "I'm Still Alive"
- "Percentages"

=== Samara Cyn - "Clink" ===
- "Clink" (from Pigeons & Planes Presents: See You Next Year 3)
