= Magic 3 =

Studio album by Nas
- Released: September 14, 2023
- Recorded: 2023
- Genre: Hip-hop
- Length: 45:43
- Label: Mass Appeal
- Producer: Hit-Boy

Nas chronology
Magic 2 (2023)	Magic 3 (2023)	Light-Years (2025)

Magic 3 is the seventeenth studio album by American rapper Nas. It was released by Mass Appeal Records on September 14, 2023, the rapper's fiftieth birthday. The album serves as a third installment to Nas' Magic series, following up Magic 2. It is also the sixth and final consecutive Nas album produced by Hit-Boy, following the King's Disease trilogy, as well as the previous two Magic albums. The album contains a sole guest appearance from Lil Wayne.

== Background ==
On September 8, 2023, almost two months after the release of Magic 2, Nas posted a cryptic video on his Instagram, hinting at another album being released soon, with the letter "N" of his logo, and the words "The Finale" being shown. On September 12, he officially announced the album, revealing the title and artwork, as well as the release date being his 50th birthday. The tracklist was revealed hours before the album's eventual release.

== Critical reception ==
Professional ratings
Aggregate scores
Source	Rating
Metacritic	86/100
Review scores
Source	Rating
Albumism	4/5 stars
AllMusic	4.5/5 stars
Clash	8/10
HipHopDX	3.8/5
RapReviews	9/10
Sputnikmusic	3.4/5

Magic 3 was met with widespread acclaim. At Metacritic, which assigns a normalized rating out of 100 to reviews from professional publications, the album has received an average score of 86 based on five reviews, indicating "universal acclaim". Robin Murray of Clash wrote, "Reaching greater and greater heights, Magic 3 could well be Nas and Hit-Boy's finest hour together – the closure of this chapter allows us to analyze their relationship, but you're still left yearning for more." Eric Diep of HipHopDX wrote, "Magic 3 is another chapter that doesn't quite surpass the original, but it's the swan song before his decision to retire. [...] Magic 3 puts the stamp on one of the most interesting late-career series in Hip Hop history, a feat that may never be duplicated." Mitch Worden of Sputnikmusic wrote, "Magic 3 is everything special about [Nas and Hit-Boy's] 6-LP run and certainly an excellent effort from modern rap's most surprisingly stellar partnership, and it's everything that might have been left behind.

Reviewing the album for AllMusic. David Crone wrote that, "The ground on which Nas stands here is so effortlessly self-assured that you'd be forgiven for thinking rap was easy. Bars are constructed loosely but never carelessly, rattled out at a headstrong pace and tossed around like playthings, jeweled with slick double entendres and the wisdom of decades behind the mike. The vast weight of the MC's legacy is the bedrock behind the words, but his snapshot living is as high-life as ever, with New York luxuries coursing like paper trails through the wordsmith's verses."

== Track listing ==
All tracks are produced by Hit-Boy.

Magic 3 track listing
No.	Title	Writer(s)	Length
1.	"Fever"	Nasir Jones; Steve Duboff; Chauncey Hollis Jr.	2:47
2.	"TSK"	Jones; Hollis	3:04
3.	"Superhero Status"	Jones; Hollis; Penelope McClendon	2:51
4.	"I Love This Feeling"	Jones; Hollis; Dexter Wansel	3:17
5.	"No Tears"	Jones; Hollis	3:11
6.	"Never Die" (featuring Lil Wayne)	Jones; Hollis; Dwayne Carter; Deke Richards; Beatrice Verdi	3:10
7.	"Pretty Young Girl"	Jones; Leroy Bonner; Hollis; Marshall Jones; Ralph Middlebrooks; Walter Morrison; Norman Napier; Andrew Noland; Marvin Pierce; Gregory Webster	2:20
8.	"Based on True Events"	Jones; Hollis	2:44
9.	"Based on True Events, Pt. 2"	Jones; Hollis	3:14
10.	"Sitting with My Thoughts"	Jones; Hollis	3:00
11.	"Blue Bentley"	Jones; Hollis	2:35
12.	"Jodeci Member"	Jones; Hollis; George Kerr	2:47
13.	"Speechless, Pt. 2"	Jones; Hollis; George Patterson	3:05
14.	"Japanese Soul Bar"	Jones; Hollis	3:01
15.	"1-800-Nas&Hit"	Jones; Hollis; Randolph Muller; Larry Payton	4:37
Total length:			45:43

Sample credits

- TSK contains a sample of "Barabas" performed by Belgian band Hooverphonic.
- I Love This Feeling contains a sample of "I think I'll stay home today" by Billy Paul.

== Commercial performance ==
Magic 3 debuted at number 20 on the UK Album Downloads Chart on September 22, 2023. In the United States, it debuted at number 13 on the Independent Albums chart.

== Personnel ==
- Nas – vocals
- Hit-Boy – production, programming, engineering
- David Kim – mixing, engineering
- Jun Kim – mixing, additional engineering
- Mike Bozzi – mastering

== Charts ==
Chart performance for Magic 3
Chart (2023–2024)	Peak position
UK Album Downloads (Official Charts)	20
UK R&B Albums (Official Charts)	7
US Billboard 200	65
US Independent Albums (Billboard)	13
US Top R&B/Hip-Hop Albums (Billboard)	26
