= King's Disease III =

Studio album by Nas
- Released: November 11, 2022
- Recorded: 2021–2022
- Genres: East Coast hip-hop; boom bap; conscious hip-hop; jazz rap
- Length: 51:52
- Label: Mass Appeal
- Producers: Hit-Boy; Jansport J; C3 Official

Nas chronology
Magic (2021)	King's Disease III (2022)	Magic 2 (2023)

King's Disease III is the fifteenth studio album by American rapper Nas. It was released on November 11, 2022 through Mass Appeal Records. The album is the third entry in Nas' King's Disease series of albums, and acts as a sequel to his 2020 album King's Disease and his 2021 album King's Disease II. The album, as with the previous two albums in the series, was executive produced by Nas and American record producer Hit-Boy. The album received widespread acclaim from critics.

At the 66th Annual Grammy Awards, the album was nominated in the Best Rap Album category.

== Background ==
On December 24, 2021, Nas surprise-released his fourteenth album Magic. On the song "Ugly", Nas confirmed the third installment of the King's Disease series was in the works with the lyrics "KD3 on the way, this just to feed the buzz." On the same day, following the release of the album, American record producer Hit-Boy announced via Twitter that he and Nas had begun working on a third King's Disease album.

On October 18, 2022, Nas announced the album, along with its release date, with a promotional poster via his social media platforms.

== Critical reception ==
Professional ratings
Aggregate scores
Source	Rating
AnyDecentMusic?	7.9/10
Metacritic	88/100
Review scores
Source	Rating
AllMusic	4.5/5 stars
Clash	8/10
HipHopDX	4.1/5
MusicOMH	4/5 stars
NME	5/5 stars
Pitchfork	7.1/10
RapReviews	9.5/10 (Note: An overall score based on a 9/10 rating for the music and a 10/10 rating for the lyrics.)
The Scotsman	4/5 stars
Slant Magazine	3.5/5 stars
The Telegraph	4/5 stars

King's Disease III was met with widespread acclaim. At Metacritic, which assigns a normalized rating out of 100 to reviews from professional publications, the album has received an average score of 88 based on eleven reviews, indicating "universal acclaim".

Concluding the review for AllMusic, David Crone wrote that, "The resulting work is at once loose and deeply complex, effortless in its incisiveness yet still dazzling at its peaks. The three bullions on the album's cover say it best: this duo keep on producing gold." Assessing the album for Clash, Robin Murray declared it, "A fantastically consistent, perpetually illuminating full-length, it shows Nas to retain a hunger and sheer fire that so many of his peers have lost. Recalling former glories while remaining fixed on the future, King's Disease III underlines the rapper's current creative streak." For The Daily Telegraph, Thomas Hobbs stated that, "Although King's Disease III might have some tonal missteps, Nas and Hit-Boy should be applauded for bringing warm soul samples back into hip hop culture at a time of such darkness and uncertainty. This is Godfather: Part III if Michael Corleone retired without all the treachery; music about being comfortable with your place and making it to the other side."

Writing for HipHopDX, Eric Diep claimed that, "KD3 keeps Nas in the relevancy conversation because his voice is still impactful, calling to action when some might say he doesn't need to do this anymore. It's a lesson in purposeful storytelling and aging with grace." Reviewing the album for NME, Niall Smith claimed that, "With King's Disease III, the New York rapper has put the seal on a strong album trilogy that proves that, three decades in, he's still a force to be reckoned with." In the review for The Scotsman, Fiona Shepherd described the Nas' work as, "moving with the times, while imparting some of his experience and wisdom – as such, he looks backwards and forwards over a pitch-shifted Mary J. Blige sample and synth arpeggios on album standout 'Reminisce'."

Reviewing the album for Pitchfork, Paul A. Thompson was more critical of it, declaring that, "The paring down of Nas' verses necessarily makes them feel less improvisatory; he has always been such an exacting writer that little seems to be discovered in the recitation of lyrics themselves, but density brings more opportunity for little bends in inflection and hitches in rhythm. The drabbest moments on KD3 come when he lapses into mechanical entrepreneur-speak ... doled out with a deliberate hand and no room for flourishes that might undercut or deepen its meaning. Fortunately these are far rarer than on the first two King's Disease volumes—and they're balanced by more charming references." Paul Attard from Slant Magazine was also slightly indifferent about the album, stating: "By adhering to a creative formula typically associated with many foundational Golden Era classics, King's Disease III often feels like a spartan exercise in pure technical ability."

== Commercial performance ==
King's Disease III debuted at number ten on the US Billboard 200 chart, earning 29,000 album-equivalent units (including 8,500 copies in pure album sales) in its first week. This became Nas' 16th top-ten album on the chart, tying him with former rival Jay-Z for the most top tens among rap artists. The album also accumulated a total of 26.47 million on-demand official streams from the set’s tracks.

In the United Kingdom, King's Disease III debuted at number 48 on the UK Albums Chart and number 2 on the UK Hip Hop and R&B Albums Chart on November 18, 2022.

== Track listing ==
All tracks produced by Hit-Boy, except where noted.

King's Disease III track listing
No.	Title	Writer(s)	Producer(s)	Length
1.	"Ghetto Reporter"	Nasir Jones; Chauncey Hollis Jr.; Jesse Blum		2:36
2.	"Legit"	Jones; Hollis; Philip Cornish		3:22
3.	"Thun"	Jones; Hollis		3:26
4.	"Michael & Quincy"	Jones; Hollis; Blum		2:47
5.	"30"	Jones; Hollis		2:18
6.	"Hood2Hood"	Jones; Hollis; Quintin Gulledge		3:00
7.	"Recession Proof"	Jones; Hollis		3:03
8.	"Reminisce"	Jones; Hollis; Blum		3:33
9.	"Serious Interlude"	Jones; Hollis; Blum		2:58
10.	"I'm on Fire"	Jones; Hollis		2:29
11.	"WTF SMH"	Jones; Hollis; Justin Keith Williams	Hit-Boy; Jansport J	3:48
12.	"Once a Man, Twice a Child"	Jones; Hollis; Chauncey Hollis III	Hit-Boy; C3 Official	3:59
13.	"Get Light"	Jones; Hollis		2:52
14.	"First Time"	Jones; Hollis		2:44
15.	"Beef"	Jones; Hollis; Dustin James Corbett		3:05
16.	"Don't Shoot"	Jones; Hollis; Jun Kim		2:32
17.	"'Til My Last Breath" (bonus track)	Jones; Hollis; Thom Jongkind^{[a]}; Idir Makhlaf^{[a]}; Timothy Jude Smith^{[a]}		3:10
Total length:				51:52

Notes

- "Serious Interlude" features uncredited background vocals by Mario

Sample credits

- "Legit" contains a sample of "A Heart Is a House for Love" written by Tristin Sigerson, Davitt Sigerson, and Bob Thiele, as performed by Billy Valentine and The Dells from The Five Heartbeats.
- "Ghetto Reporter" contains a sample of "Just Us" performed by Richard Pryor.
- "Thun" contains a sample of "The Bridge Is Over" written and performed by DJ Scott La Rock & KRS-One under the musical group Boogie Down Productions.
- "Hood2Hood" contains an interpolation of "Da Butt" written by Marcus Miller and performed by group E.U.
- "Get Light" contains an interpolation of "Party and Bullshit" written by Easy Mo Bee, as performed by The Notorious B.I.G.
- "Reminisce" contains a sample of "You Remind Me", written by Dave "Jam" Hall and Eric Milteer, as performed by Mary J. Blige.
- "I'm on Fire" contains elements from NBA Jam and Street Fighter II: The World Warrior.
- "Beef" contains a sample of "N.Y. State Of Mind", produced by DJ Premier, as performed by Nas.
- ^{^[a]} "Til' My Last Breath" contains a sample of "Narco", written by Thom Jongkind, Idir Makhlaf and Timothy Jude Smith, as performed by Blasterjaxx and Timmy Trumpet.

== Charts ==
Chart performance for King's Disease III
Chart (2022)	Peak position
Australian Digital Albums (ARIA)	9
Belgian Albums (Ultratop Flanders)	101
Canadian Albums (Billboard)	29
Dutch Albums (Album Top 100)	97
Japanese Digital Albums (Oricon)	46
Swiss Albums (Schweizer Hitparade)	42
UK Albums (Official Charts)	48
UK R&B Albums (Official Charts)	2
UK Independent Albums (Official Charts)	30
US Billboard 200	10
US Top R&B/Hip-Hop Albums (Billboard)	4
