= Shaka Senghor =

American convicted murderer, college lecturer, author

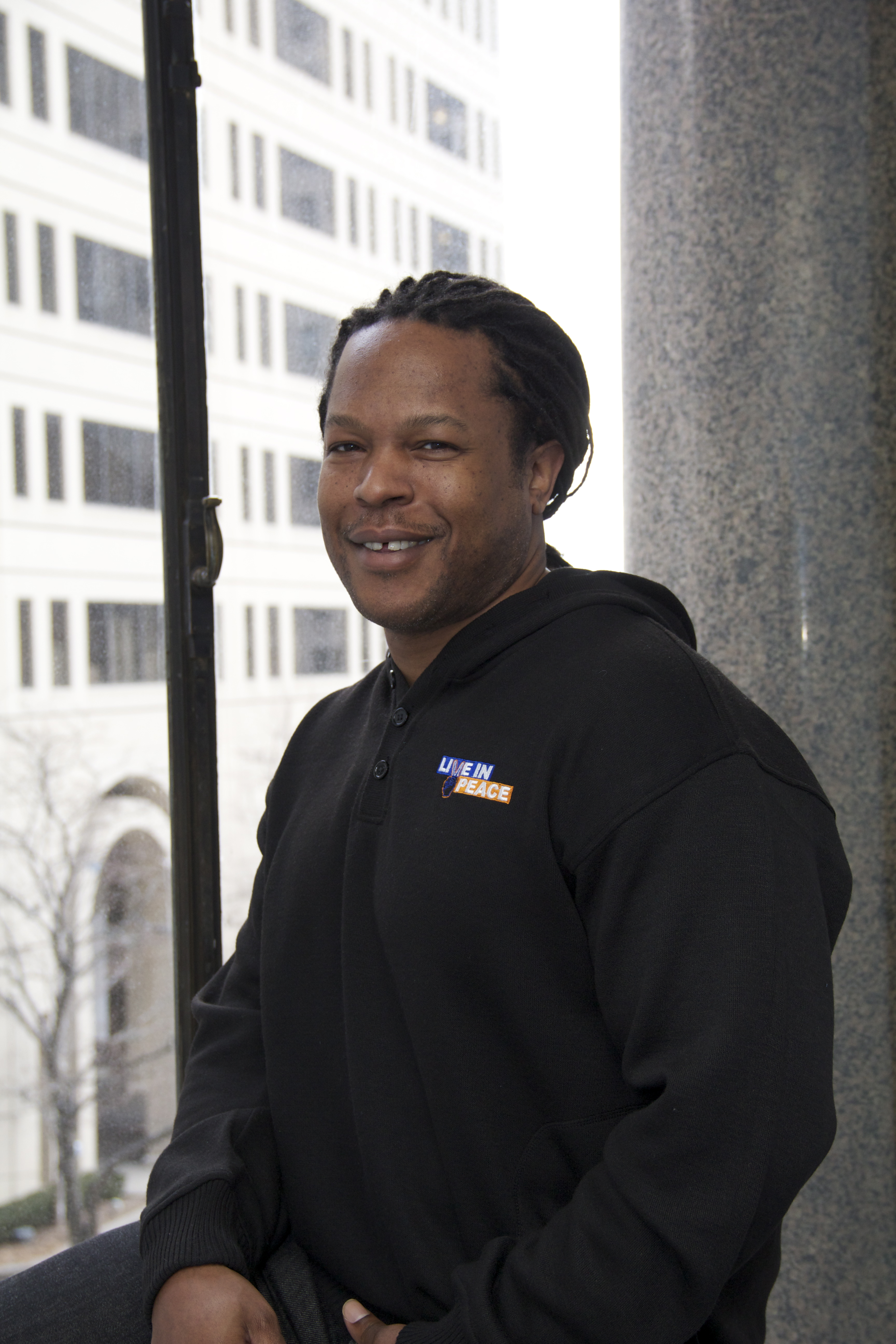
- Born: 21 June 1972 (age 54)
- Occupations: College lecturer, Author
- Website: www.shakasenghor.com

Shaka Senghor is an author, speaker, and coach. He was formerly Vice President of Corporate Communications at Navan, an MIT Media Lab Director's Fellow, and Fellow in the W.K. Kellogg Foundation's Community Leadership Network.

Involved in the drug trade at age 19, Senghor shot and killed a man in 1991, for which he served 19 years in prison. His book about his experience, Writing My Wrongs: Life, Death and Redemption in an American Prison (2016), became a New York Times best-seller. His second book, Letters to the Sons of Society, collects letters written to his sons Jay and Sekou.

== Biography ==
Senghor was raised in a middle class family in Detroit during the 1980s. He ran away from what he claims was an abusive home at the age of 14, after which he claims he was persuaded to join the illegal drug trade by older, more experienced dealers.

In the summer of 1991, Senghor shot and killed a man, after which he spent 19 years incarcerated in different prisons in Michigan, seven years of which were in solitary confinement. Of these seven years, four and a half were consecutive. He was released from prison in 2010. In his book Writing My Wrongs, Senghor discusses rehabilitation and accountability while in incarceration.

In addition to his positions at Navan and the W.K. Kellogg Foundation's Community Leadership Network, Senghor has taught classes at University of Michigan and the MIT Media Lab.

Senghor collaborated with rapper Nas on his 2021 album King’s Disease II, appearing on the track "Composure". Senghor appeared on The Joe Rogan Experience Podcast in July 2025.

== Books ==
- Senghor, Shaka (2016). Writing My Wrongs: Life, Death, and Redemption in an American Prison. Convergent Books. ISBN 978-1101907313.
- Senghor, Shaka (2022). Letters to the Sons of Society: A Father's Invitation to Love, Honesty, and Freedom. Convergent Books. ISBN 978-0593238035.
- Senghor, Shaka (2025). How to Be Free: A Proven Guide to Escaping Life's Hidden Prisons. Authors Equity. ISBN 979-8893310511.

== See also ==
- List of homicides in Michigan
