= Ultra Black =

Song by American rapper Nas

Single by Nas featuring Hit-Boy

from the album King's Disease
- Released: August 14, 2020
- Genre: Conscious hip hop
- Length: 3:18
- Label: Mass Appeal
- Songwriters: Nasir Jones; Chauncey Hollis
- Producers: Hit-Boy; Audio Anthem

Nas singles chronology
"Rodeo (Remix)" (2020)	"Ultra Black" (2020)	"Define My Name" (2024)

Music video
- "Ultra Black" on YouTube

"Ultra Black" is a song by American rapper Nas featuring Hit-Boy, the producer. It was released on August 14, 2020, as the lead single from Nas's thirteenth studio album King's Disease (2020).

== Background and composition ==
In the song, Nas raps his black heritage and African-American culture over a "laid back breakbeat and jazz chords". He pays homage to "all things black", and promotes Black pride. In an interview with NME in November 2020, Nas said that the song "represents love".

== Controversy ==
The song attracted attention for lyrics that were perceived as a diss towards singer and rapper Doja Cat: "We goin' ultra Black, unapologetically Black / The opposite of Doja Cat, Michael Blackson Black". In May 2020, Doja Cat (who is of Zulu South African and American Jewish heritage) had been accused of racism and association with white supremacists, though she denied the allegations.

Shortly after the song was released, Doja responded with a TikTok video in which she sarcastically says, "I'm so offended and upset by this song. Have you guys heard 'Fruit Salad' by The Wiggles?" On August 24, 2020, Nas and Hit-Boy had a joint interview with radio station Power 106, in which Nas stated he meant no disrespect, and that he was only saying something that rhymed with "Ultra Black". In his NME interview in November, Nas commented on how the attention the song received was typical of the social media age.

== Music video ==
A music video was released on August 26, 2020. Directed by Spike Jordan, it opens with Nas rapping in his kitchen while Hit-Boy plays a beat in the living room with a baby girl on his lap. Nas also appears in various areas of New York City, with interspersed scenes of black families bonding. The visual also features cameos from designers Dapper Dan and Kerby Jean-Raymond.

== Personnel ==
Credits adapted from Tidal.

- Hit-Boy – engineering
- Audio Anthem – co-production
- Mike Bozzi – mastering engineering
- David Kim – mixing
- Gabriel Zardes – engineering
- Mark "Exit" Goodchild – engineering
