= Nobody (Nas and Lauryn Hill song) =

2021 song by Nas and Lauryn Hill

Song by Nas featuring Lauryn Hill

from the album King's Disease II
- Released: August 6, 2021
- Genre: Hip hop; jazz rap
- Length: 4:42
- Label: Mass Appeal; The Orchard
- Songwriters: Nasir Jones; Lauryn Hill; Dustin James Corbett; Chauncey Hollis; Joshua Strange
- Producer: Hit-Boy

"Nobody" is a song by American rapper Nas from his thirteenth studio album, King's Disease II (2021). The song was produced by Hit-Boy, and features additional verses from fellow American rapper Lauryn Hill. The song was written by the three aforementioned artists, along with songwriters Dustin James Corbett and Joshua Strange.

"Nobody" received positive reception from music critics, who praised Hill's verse. The song was named one of Barack Obama's favorite songs of 2021, and was nominated for Impact Track at the 2022 BET Hip Hop Awards.

== Background ==
"Nobody" marked the second musical collaboration between Nas and Lauryn Hill. They first worked together on the 1996 hit single "If I Ruled the World (Imagine That)". The two rappers also went on the road together for the Life Is Good/Black Rage tour, in 2012, and again on a joint tour in 2017.

While Hill sang on their previous collaboration, on "Nobody" she gave a comparatively rare rap verse.

== Music and lyrics ==
Nas' verse discussed his desire to escape from the media spotlight: "If Chappelle moved to Ghana to find his peace, then I'm rollin/Where the service always roamin', I'm packin' my bags and goin'." During her verse, Hill explained her absence from the music Industry, with the lyrics: "They tried to box me out while takin' what they want from me/I spent too many years living too uncomfortably," while also defending her habit of arriving late to her own concerts: "My awareness like Keanu in The Matrix/I'm savin' souls and y'all complainin' 'bout my lateness."

== Critical reception ==
Upon its release the song began trending on social media, and received positive feedback from music critics. Dana Scott of HipHopDX, praised Nas' flow, comparing it to his previous acclaimed work.

Most fans and critics mentioned Hill's verse as the highlight of the song. Writing for NME, Will Lavin called the song a "glistening, esoteric gem", and referred to Hill's rhymes as a "lyrical master class". It was named one of the best songs released that week by Entertainment Weekly, who stated that Hill proved "she's still one of the best damn rappers alive"; while Will Schube of UDiscover Music, stated a similar sentiment. Rolling Stone argued that she "manages an impossible balance of fierce memory and unbotheredness" on the song, before proclaiming that she "absolutely levitates above the rap game, offering the learned vantage point of someone who has reached its mountaintop after a treacherous hike up."

=== Recognition ===
Several media outlets declared Hill's contribution to "Nobody" as one of the best verses of 2021, including BET, Okayplayer, and HipHopDX. Complex named it the second best verse of that year. Former United States president Barack Obama listed "Nobody" as one of his favorite songs of 2021.

== Awards and nominations ==
Year	Award	Category	Result
2021	HipHopDX Awards	Best Rap Verse of the Year (Lauryn Hill)	Nominated
2021	HipHopDX Awards	Best Hip Hop Song of the Year	Nominated
2022	BET Hip Hop Awards	Impact Track	Nominated

== Chart performance ==
Chart (2021)	Peak position
New Zealand Hot Singles (RMNZ)	33
UK Singles Sales (Official Charts)	98
US Bubbling Under Hot 100 (Billboard)	2
US Hot R&B/Hip-Hop Songs (Billboard)	42
