= Magic (Nas album) =

Studio album by Nas
- Released: December 24, 2021
- Genres: Hip-hop; hardcore hip-hop
- Length: 29:16
- Label: Mass Appeal
- Producers: Hit-Boy; Corbett

Nas chronology
King's Disease II (2021)	Magic (2021)	King's Disease III (2022)

Magic is the fourteenth studio album by American rapper Nas. It was released on December 24, 2021, through Mass Appeal Records. It serves as the third consecutive Nas album that is produced by Hit-Boy, following King's Disease and King's Disease II. The album features guest appearances from ASAP Rocky and DJ Premier.

== Background ==
On December 23, 2021, Nas announced the album, revealing the title, artwork, and tracklist. On the song "Ugly", Nas confirmed the third installment of King's Disease, saying "KD3 on the way, this just to feed the buzz."

== Critical reception ==
Professional ratings
Aggregate scores
Source	Rating
Metacritic	78/100
Review scores
Source	Rating
AllMusic	3.5/5 stars
Clash	9/10
HipHopDX	4.3/5
Pitchfork	6.8/10
Exclaim!	9/10
Beats Per Minute	87%

At Metacritic, which assigns a normalized rating out of 100 to reviews from professional publications, the album received an average score of 78, based on eight reviews, indicating widespread acclaim.

In the review for AllMusic, Fred Thomas felt that "The nine-track album Magic is cut from a similar cloth as the King's Disease installments that preceded it but works as more of a stopgap release to tide over listeners as King's Disease III is being finalized. Hit-Boy's thick, straightforward, and somewhat retro-stylized production again offers as much of a voice here as Nas' fluid rhyming and wizened lyricism." Concluding the review for HipHopDX, Riley Wallace wrote, "despite how direct the lyricism is, it plays like two friends riffing in the studio and building off each other's energy; listeners can hear how much Nas loves what he's doing. The fact Hip Hop fans are getting appetizers of this caliber to hold us over until an inevitable third entry in the series is, in itself, Magic." Reviewing the album for Clash, Niall Smith declared that, "On 'Magic', Nas seems as tuned into the culture as ever before, fulfilling his prophecy as rap leading lyricist, almost as if he's ushering in a new prime of his career. In the years to come, the 'King's Disease' era ('Magic' in particular) will likely be ranked among the upper echelons of Nas' discography. With a solid foundation of beats, introspective lyricism, and a sharp pen at his disposal, Nas might be the only rapper to have two releases in the best albums of the 2021 conversation. Magic."

Pete Tosiello was more critical in his review for Pitchfork, claiming that "You could knock Magic for being backward-facing, but then again, all of Nas's music is backward-facing. It's charming when he revisits his own gospels, but the nostalgia act would be easier to swallow if it weren't so resentful." Likewise, Robert Christgau, in his positive review of Nas’s previous album King’s Disease II mentions the "bottom falls out" on Magic, to which he did not dedicate a stand-alone review.

== Commercial performance ==
Magic debuted at number 27 on the US Billboard 200 with 22,000 album-equivalent units.

== Track listing ==
All tracks written by Nasir Jones and Chauncey Hollis (Hit-Boy) and produced by Hit-Boy, except as noted.

Magic track listing
No.	Title	Writer(s)	Producer(s)	Length
1.	"Speechless"			3:06
2.	"Meet Joe Black"			2:51
3.	"Ugly"	Jones; Hollis; Dustin Corbett	Hit-Boy; Corbett	3:18
4.	"40-16 Building"			2:55
5.	"Hollywood Gangsta"			3:15
6.	"Wu for the Children"			3:18
7.	"Wave Gods" (with ASAP Rocky and DJ Premier)	Jones; Rakim Mayers; Christopher Martin; Hollis		3:10
8.	"The Truth"			3:27
9.	"Dedicated"			3:52
Total length:				29:16

== Charts ==
Weekly chart performance for Magic
Chart (2021–2022)	Peak position
Belgian Albums (Ultratop Flanders)	173
Canadian Albums (Billboard)	58
Swiss Albums (Schweizer Hitparade)	34
UK Independent Albums (Official Charts)	18
UK R&B Albums (Official Charts)	5
US Billboard 200	27
US Top R&B/Hip-Hop Albums (Billboard)	11
