= What You Expect =

EP by Big Sean and Hit-Boy
- Released: October 29, 2021
- Length: 18:54
- Labels: FF to Def; Def Jam
- Producers: Hit-Boy; Ace G.; Carter Lang; Don Cannon; G Dav; G. Ry; Jesse Blum; Oz; Rogét Chahayed

Big Sean chronology
Detroit 2 (2020)	What You Expect (2021)	Better Me Than You (2024)

Hit-Boy chronology
The Chauncey Hollis Project (2020)	What You Expect (2021)

Singles from What You Expect
- 1. "What a Life" Released: October 22, 2021

What You Expect is a collaborative extended play by American rapper Big Sean and American record producer Hit-Boy. It was released through Big Sean's own label, FF to Def, and Def Jam Recordings on October 29, 2021. The EP features guest appearances from Bryson Tiller, Lil Durk, Babyface Ray, and 42 Dugg. Production was mainly handled by Hit-Boy on every track along with side help from G Dav, Oz, Jesse Blum, Rogét Chahayed, Don Cannon, G. Ry, Bryvn, PittThaKid, and Ace G. It was supported by the release of one single, "What a Life", the closing track, which was released exactly a week prior to the release of the EP.

Professional ratings
Review scores
Source	Rating
AllMusic	3.5/5 stars

== Background and promotion ==
Big Sean and Hit-Boy have extensively collaborated before the release of the EP. On October 28, 2021, both artists announced the EP, with Sean admitting that he planned to release only one single the same day as the EP was released, but decided to release five songs, which would be part of an EP. The tracklist was revealed hours later. The two artists released the closing track, "What a Life", on October 22, 2021, with a music video.

== Track listing ==
All tracks are written by Sean Anderson and Chauncey Hollis, Jr., with additional contributors noted.

What You Expect track listing
No.	Title	Writer(s)	Producer(s)	Length
1.	"Chaos"		Hit-Boy	3:00
2.	"Into It"	Greg Davis	Hit-Boy; G Dav	3:10
3.	"The One"	Ozan Yildirim; Cheryl Gamble; Tamara Johnson-George; Leanne Lyons; Andrea Martin; Ivan Matias; Allen Gordon	Hit-Boy; Oz; Jesse Blum^{[a]}	2:26
4.	"Loyal to a Fault" (featuring Bryson Tiller and Lil Durk)	Bryson Tiller; Durk Banks; Rogét Chahayed; Donald Cannon; Ryan Martinez; Bryan Yepes; Martin Pitt; Alex Ernewein	Hit-Boy; Chahayed^{[a]}; Don Cannon^{[b]}; G. Ry^{[b]}; Bryvn^{[b]}; PittThaKid^{[b]}; Ace G.^{[b]}	4:03
5.	"Offense" (featuring Babyface Ray and 42 Dugg)	Marcellus Register; Dion Hayes; Davis; Chahayed; Jesse Blum	Hit-Boy; G Dav; Chahayed^{[a]}; Blum^{[a]}	3:15
6.	"What a Life"	Martinez; Chahayed; Carter Lang	Hit-Boy; G. Ry; Chahayed^{[a]}; Lang^{[a]}	2:58
Total length:				18:54

Notes

- ^[a] signifies an additional producer.
- ^[b] signifies a co-producer.
- "Into It" features uncredited additional vocals from Nas.
- "The One" contains samples from "You're the One", performed by SWV.

== Personnel ==
Musicians

- Big Sean – vocals (all tracks), songwriting (all tracks)
- Hit-Boy – production (all tracks), songwriting (all tracks)
- G Dav – production (tracks 2, 5), songwriting (tracks 2, 5)
- Jesse Blum – horn (track 1), additional production (tracks 3, 5), songwriting (track 5)
- Oz – production (track 3), songwriting (track 3)
- Coko – songwriting (track 3)
- Tamara Johnson-George – songwriting (track 3)
- Leanne Lyons – songwriting (track 3)
- Andrea Martin – songwriting (track 3)
- Ivan Matias – songwriting (track 3)
- Allen Gordon – songwriting (track 3)
- Bryson Tiller – vocals (track 4), songwriting (track 4)
- Lil Durk – vocals (track 4), songwriting (track 4)
- Rogét Chahayed – additional production (tracks 4–6), songwriting (tracks 4–6), keyboards (tracks 4–6)
- Don Cannon – co-production (track 4), songwriting (track 4)
- G. Ry – co-production (track 4), songwriting (tracks 4, 6), production (track 6)
- Bryvn – co-production (track 4), songwriting (track 4), bass (track 4)
- PittThaKid – co-production (track 4), songwriting (track 4)
- Ace G. – co-production (track 4), songwriting (track 4)
- Babyface Ray – vocals (track 5), songwriting (track 5)
- 42 Dugg – vocals (track 5), songwriting (track 5)
- Carter Lang – additional production (track 6), keyboards (track 6)

Technical

- David Kim – mixer (tracks 1–3, 5, 6), recording engineer (tracks 5, 6)
- Colin Leonard – mastering engineer (tracks 1–6)
- Tom Kahre – recording engineer (tracks 1–4, 6)
- Michael Miller – assistant recording engineer (tracks 1, 4)
- Gregg Rominiecki – mixer (track 4)

== Charts ==
Chart performance for What You Expect
Chart (2021)	Peak position
US Billboard 200	76
US Top R&B/Hip-Hop Albums (Billboard)	41
