= Grammy Award for Best Rap Album =

Honor presented to recording artists for quality rap albums

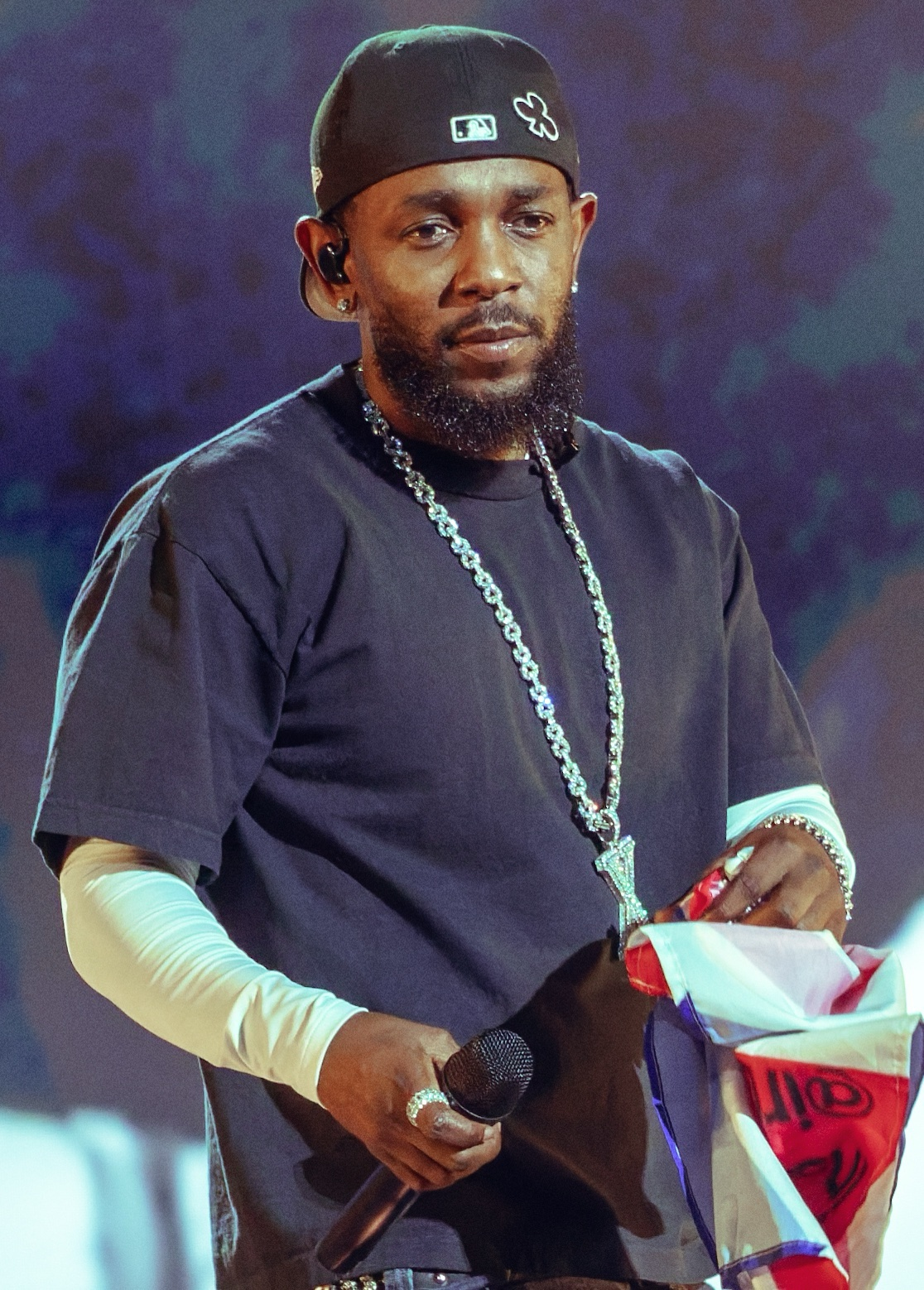
- GNX by Kendrick Lamar is the most recent recipient
- Awarded for: Quality albums with rapping
- Country: United States
- Presented by: National Academy of Recording Arts and Sciences
- First award: 1996
- Currently held by: Kendrick Lamar – GNX (2026)

Highlights
- Most wins: Eminem (6)
- Most nominations: Jay-Z (11)
- Website: grammy.com

The Grammy Award for Best Rap Album is an award presented to recording artists for quality albums with rapping at the Grammy Awards, a ceremony that was established in 1958 and originally called the Gramophone Awards. Honors in several categories are presented at the ceremony annually by the National Academy of Recording Arts and Sciences of the United States to "honor artistic achievement, technical proficiency and overall excellence in the recording industry, without regard to album sales or chart position".

In 1995, the Academy announced the addition of the award category Best Rap Album. The first award was presented to the group Naughty by Nature at the 38th Grammy Awards the following year. According to the category description guide for the 69th Grammy Awards (2027), the award is presented for "albums containing greater than 66% playing time of new rap recordings". Award recipients also include the producers, engineers, and/or mixers of greater than 50% of playing time of the album. As of 2027, songwriters are also included, provided they also worked on at least 50% of playing time.

As of 2025, Eminem holds the record for the most wins in this category, with six. Lauryn Hill was the first female artist to win in this category, when she won in 1997 with the Fugees. The duo Outkast and rapper Tyler, The Creator have both received the award twice. Jay-Z holds the record for the most nominations, with eleven. Drake became the first non-American winner in this category when he won this award in 2013. The Roots have received the most nominations without a win, with five. Eminem and Kanye West are the only artists to win the award in consecutive years, with Eminem achieving the feat twice. In 2016, Drake's If You're Reading This It's Too Late became the first mixtape to get nominated for the award, and in 2017, Chance the Rapper's Coloring Book became the first mixtape to win the award. In 2019, Cardi B became the first solo female rapper to win for Invasion of Privacy.

== Recipients ==
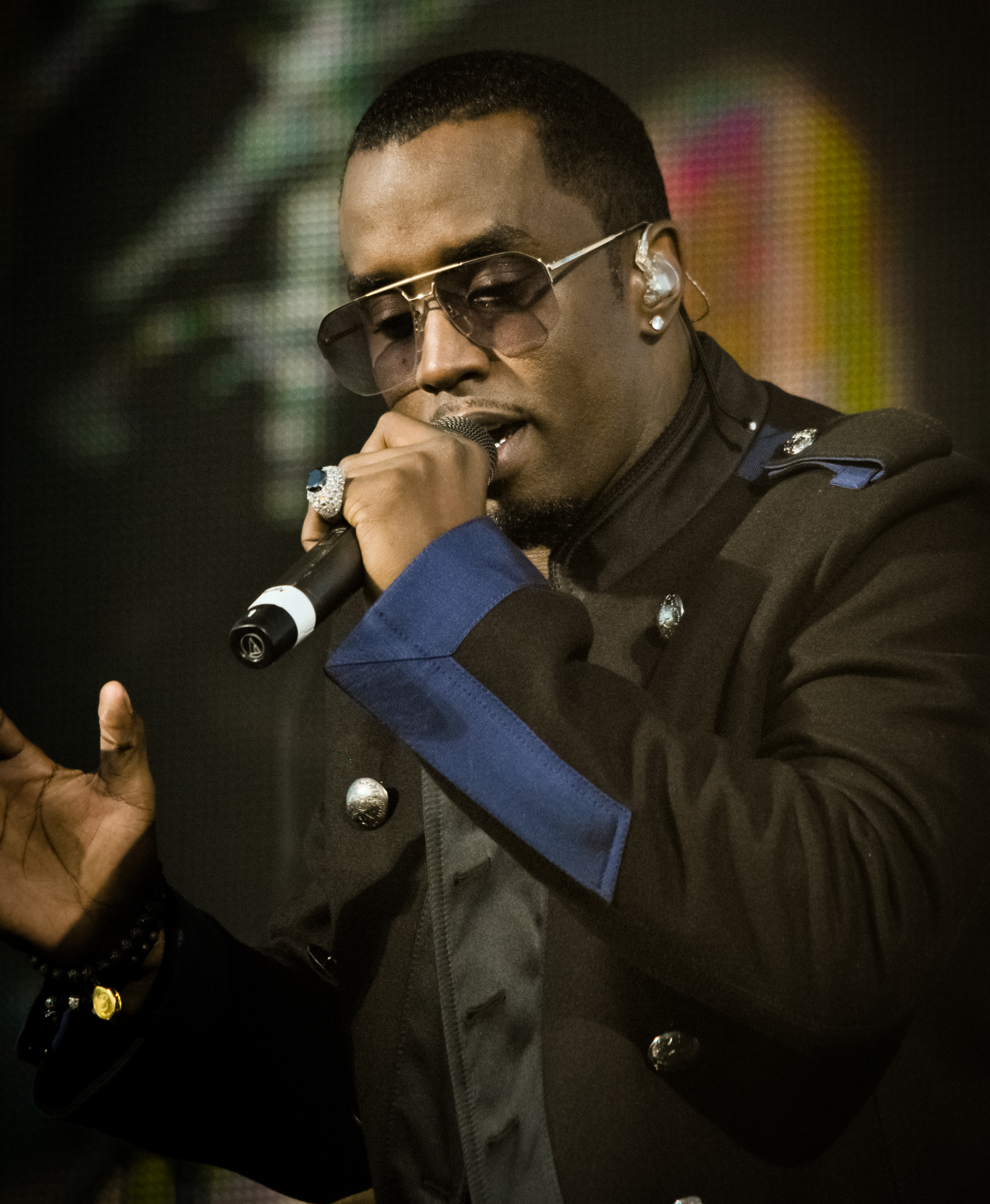
1998 winner Sean Combs (credited as Puff Daddy), performing in 2010

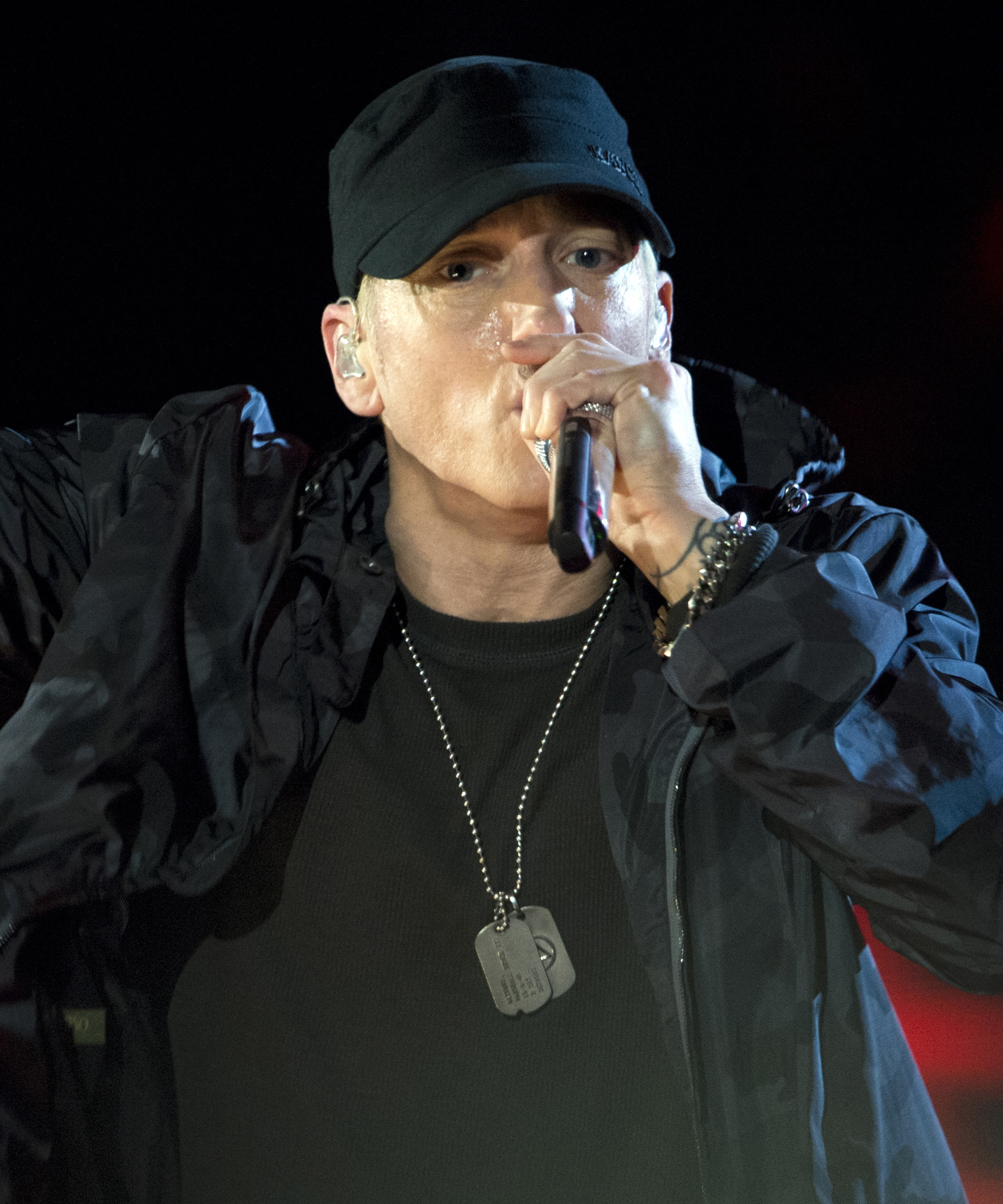
Six-time award winner Eminem, performing in 2014

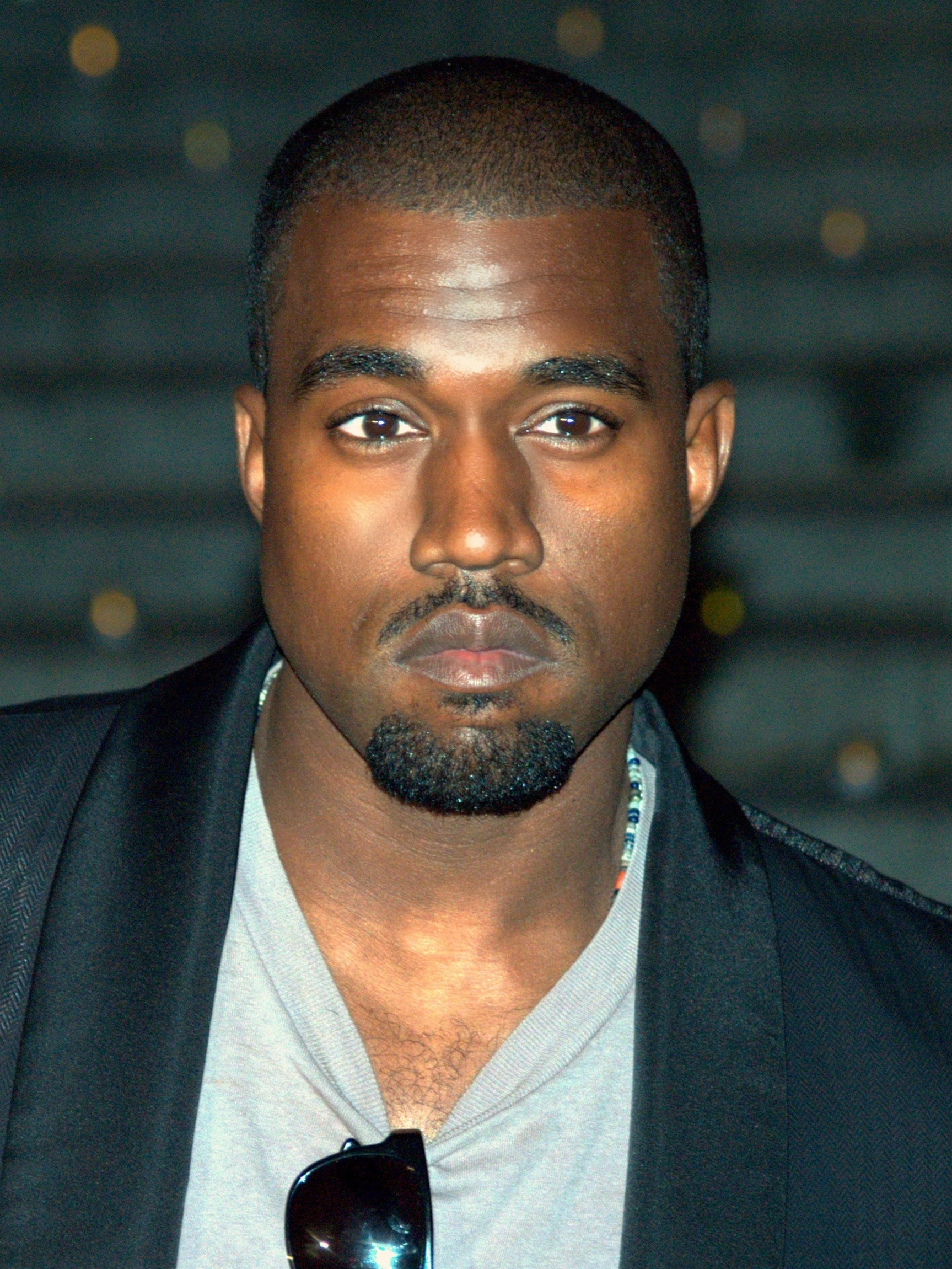
Four-time award winner Kanye West

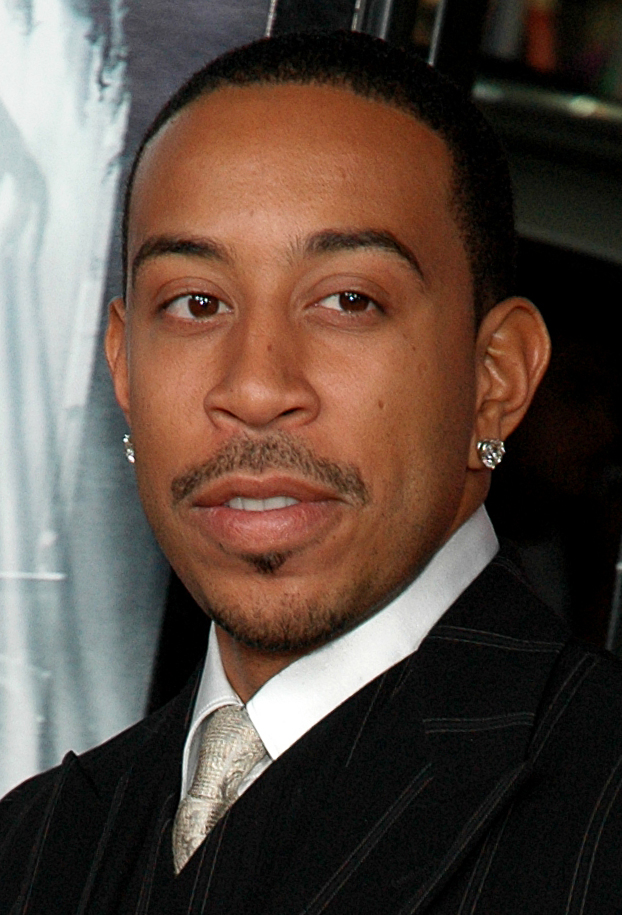
2007 award winner Ludacris

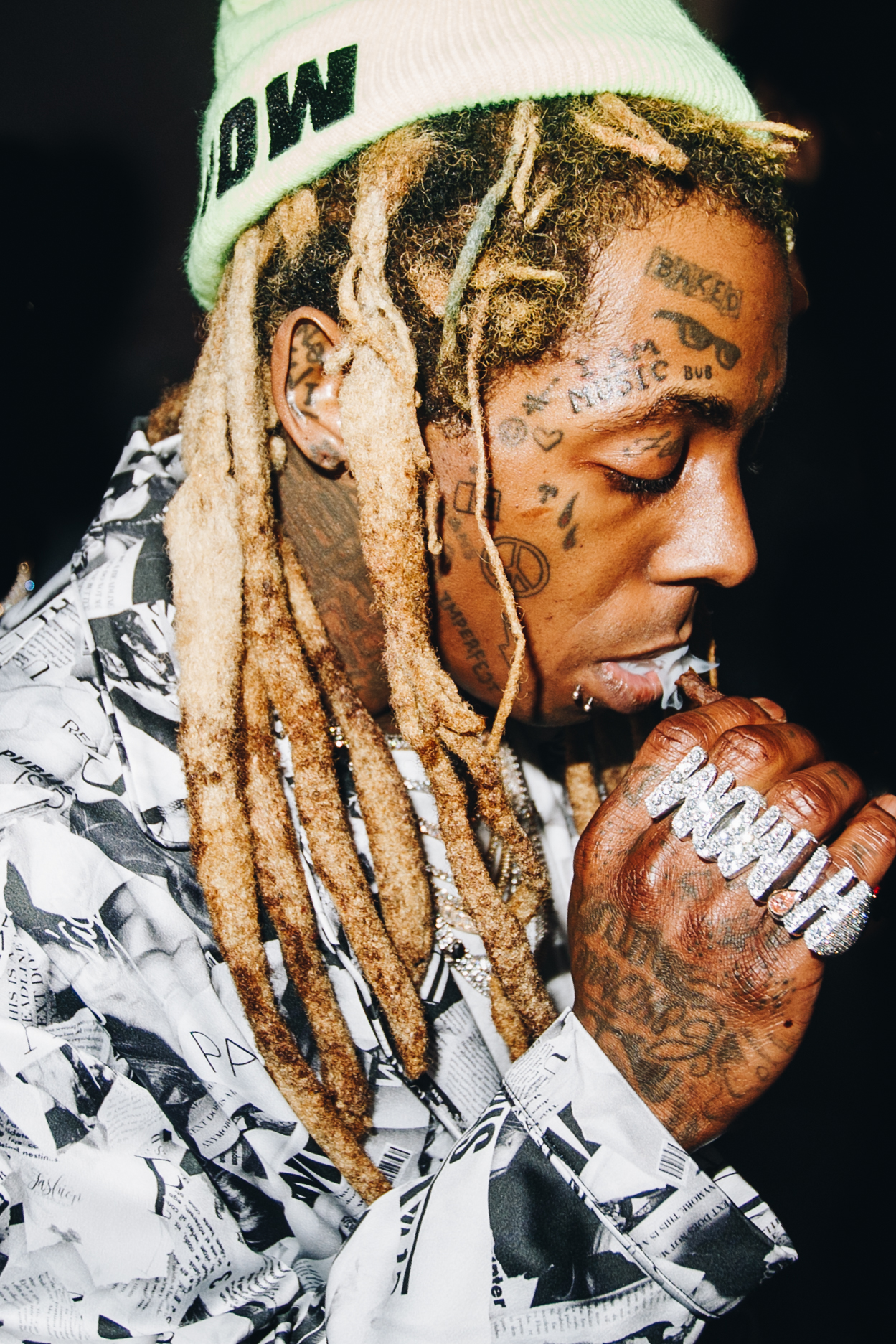
2009 award winner Lil Wayne

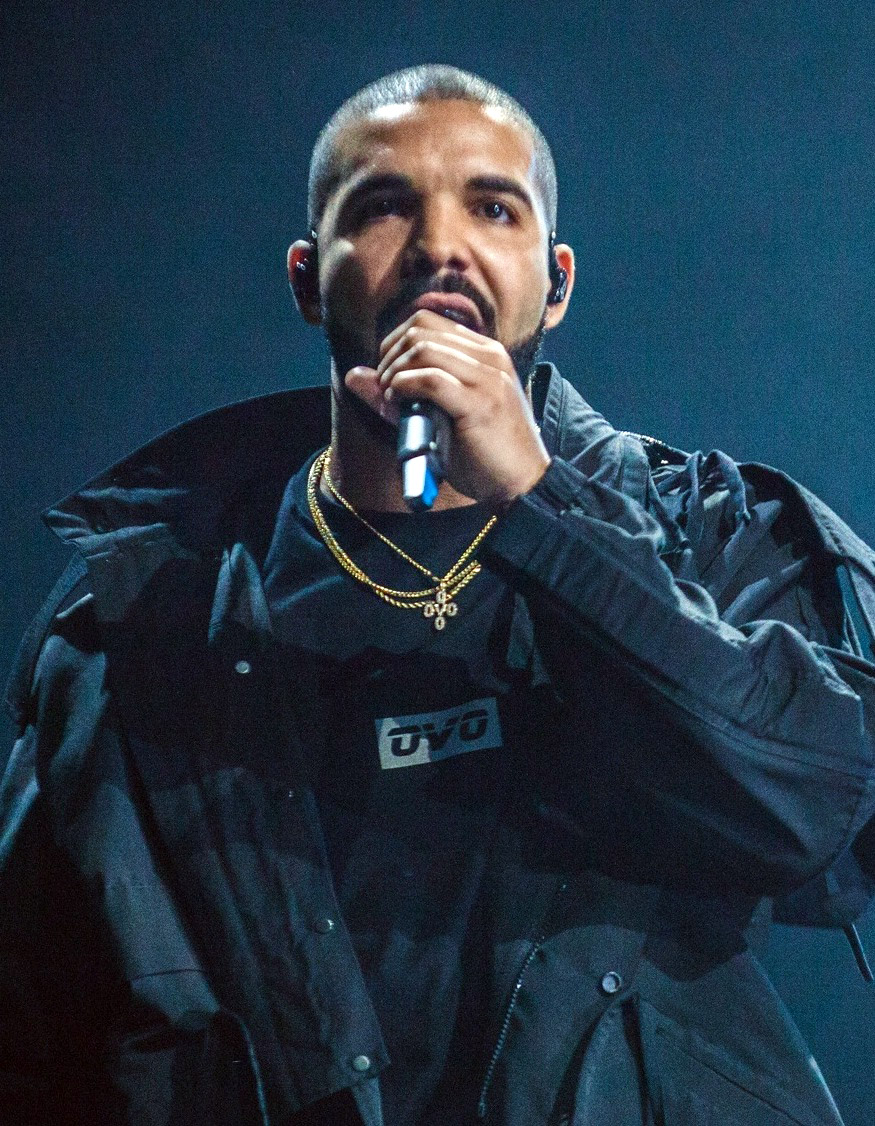
2013 award winner Drake

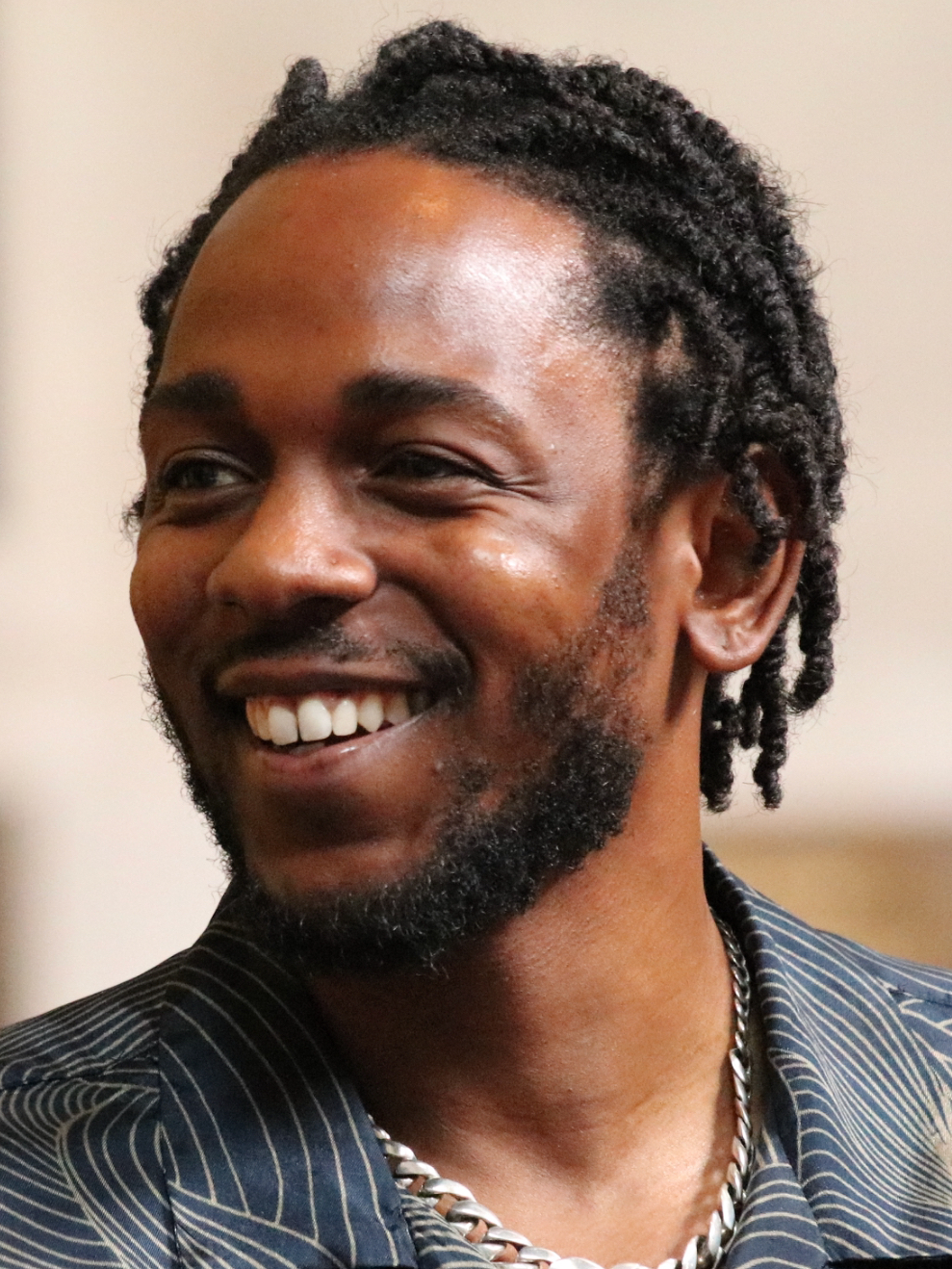
Four-time award winner Kendrick Lamar

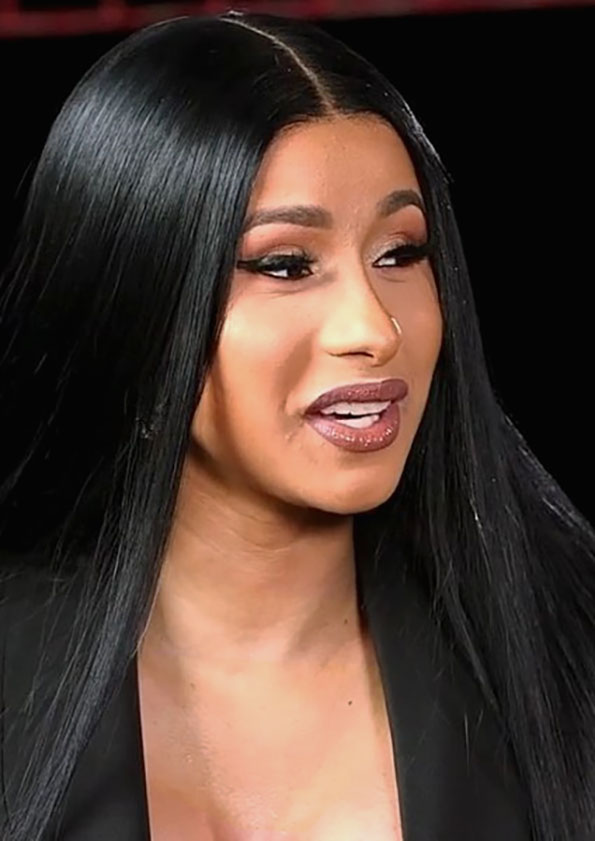
2019 award winner Cardi B, the first solo female rapper to win the award

=== 1990s ===
1990s recipients
Year	Work	Artist
1996	Poverty's Paradise	Naughty by Nature
1996	E. 1999 Eternal	Bone Thugs-n-Harmony
1996	I Wish	Skee-Lo
1996	Me Against the World	2Pac
1996	Return to the 36 Chambers: The Dirty Version	Ol' Dirty Bastard
1997	The Score	Fugees
1997	All Eyez On Me	2Pac
1997	Beats, Rhymes and Life	A Tribe Called Quest
1997	Gangsta's Paradise	Coolio
1997	Mr. Smith	LL Cool J
1998	No Way Out	Puff Daddy and the Family
1998	Life After Death	The Notorious B.I.G.
1998	Supa Dupa Fly	Missy Elliott
1998	Wu-Tang Forever	Wu-Tang Clan
1998	Wyclef Jean Presents The Carnival	Wyclef Jean
1999	Vol. 2... Hard Knock Life	Jay-Z
1999	Capital Punishment	Big Pun
1999	Harlem World	Mase
1999	Life in 1472	Jermaine Dupri
1999	The Love Movement	A Tribe Called Quest

=== 2000s ===
2000s recipients
Year	Work	Artist
2000	The Slim Shady LP	Eminem
2000	Da Real World	Missy Elliott
2000	E.L.E. (Extinction Level Event): The Final World Front	Busta Rhymes
2000	I Am...	Nas
2000	Things Fall Apart	The Roots
2001	The Marshall Mathers LP	Eminem
2001	2001	Dr. Dre
2001	Country Grammar	Nelly
2001	...And Then There Was X	DMX
2001	Vol. 3... Life and Times of S. Carter	Jay-Z
2002	Stankonia	Outkast
2002	Back for the First Time	Ludacris
2002	The Blueprint	Jay-Z
2002	Pain Is Love	Ja Rule
2002	Scorpion	Eve
2003	The Eminem Show	Eminem
2003	Diary of a Sinner: 1st Entry	Petey Pablo
2003	Nellyville	Nelly
2003	Tarantula	Mystikal
2003	Word of Mouf	Ludacris
2004	Speakerboxxx/The Love Below	Outkast
2004	The Blueprint 2: The Gift & the Curse	Jay-Z
2004	Get Rich or Die Tryin'	50 Cent
2004	Phrenology	The Roots
2004	Under Construction	Missy Elliott
2005	The College Dropout	Kanye West
2005	The Black Album	Jay-Z
2005	The DEFinition	LL Cool J
2005	Suit	Nelly
2005	To the 5 Boroughs	Beastie Boys
2006	Late Registration	Kanye West
2006	Be	Common
2006	The Cookbook	Missy Elliott
2006	Encore	Eminem
2006	The Massacre	50 Cent
2007	Release Therapy	Ludacris
2007	Game Theory	The Roots
2007	In My Mind	Pharrell
2007	King	T.I.
2007	Lupe Fiasco's Food & Liquor	Lupe Fiasco
2008	Graduation	Kanye West
2008	Finding Forever	Common
2008	Hip-Hop Is Dead	Nas
2008	Kingdom Come	Jay-Z
2008	T.I. vs. T.I.P.	T.I.
2009	Tha Carter III	Lil Wayne
2009	American Gangster	Jay-Z
2009	Lupe Fiasco's The Cool	Lupe Fiasco
2009	Paper Trail	T.I.
2009	Untitled	Nas

=== 2010s ===
2010s recipients
Year	Work	Artist
2010	Relapse	Eminem
2010	The Ecstatic	Mos Def
2010	The Renaissance	Q-Tip
2010	R.O.O.T.S.	Flo Rida
2010	Universal Mind Control	Common
2011	Recovery	Eminem
2011	The Blueprint 3	Jay-Z
2011	B.o.B Presents: The Adventures of Bobby Ray	B.o.B
2011	How I Got Over	The Roots
2011	Thank Me Later	Drake
2012	My Beautiful Dark Twisted Fantasy	Kanye West
2012	Lasers	Lupe Fiasco
2012	Pink Friday	Nicki Minaj
2012	Tha Carter IV	Lil Wayne
2012	Watch the Throne	Jay-Z and Kanye West
2013	Take Care	Drake
2013	Based on a T.R.U. Story	2 Chainz
2013	Food & Liquor II: The Great American Rap Album Pt. 1	Lupe Fiasco
2013	God Forgives, I Don't	Rick Ross
2013	Life Is Good	Nas
2013	Undun	The Roots
2014	The Heist	Macklemore & Ryan Lewis
2014	Good Kid, M.A.A.D City	Kendrick Lamar
2014	Magna Carta Holy Grail	Jay-Z
2014	Nothing Was the Same	Drake
2014	Yeezus	Kanye West
2015	The Marshall Mathers LP 2	Eminem
2015	Because the Internet	Childish Gambino
2015	Blacc Hollywood	Wiz Khalifa
2015	The New Classic	Iggy Azalea
2015	Nobody's Smiling	Common
2015	Oxymoron	ScHoolboy Q
2016	To Pimp a Butterfly	Kendrick Lamar
2016	2014 Forest Hills Drive	J. Cole
2016	Compton	Dr. Dre
2016	If You're Reading This It's Too Late	Drake
2016	The Pinkprint	Nicki Minaj
2017	Coloring Book	Chance the Rapper
2017	And the Anonymous Nobody...	De La Soul
2017	Blank Face LP	ScHoolboy Q
2017	The Life of Pablo	Kanye West
2017	Major Key	DJ Khaled
2017	Views	Drake
2018	Damn	Kendrick Lamar
2018	4:44	Jay-Z
2018	Culture	Migos
2018	Flower Boy	Tyler, the Creator
2018	Laila's Wisdom	Rapsody
2019	Invasion of Privacy	Cardi B
2019	Astroworld	Travis Scott
2019	Daytona	Pusha T
2019	Swimming	Mac Miller
2019	Victory Lap	Nipsey Hussle

=== 2020s ===
2020s recipients
Year	Work	Artist
2020	Igor	Tyler, the Creator
2020	Championships	Meek Mill
2020	I Am > I Was	21 Savage
2020	The Lost Boy	Cordae
2020	Revenge of the Dreamers III	Dreamville
2021	King's Disease	Nas
2021	Alfredo	Freddie Gibbs and The Alchemist
2021	The Allegory	Royce Da 5'9"
2021	Black Habits	D Smoke
2021	A Written Testimony	Jay Electronica
2022	Call Me If You Get Lost	Tyler, the Creator
2022	Certified Lover Boy (withdrawn)	Drake
2022	Donda	Kanye West
2022	King's Disease II	Nas
2022	The Off-Season	J. Cole
2023	Mr. Morale & the Big Steppers	Kendrick Lamar
2023	Come Home the Kids Miss You	Jack Harlow
2023	God Did	DJ Khaled
2023	I Never Liked You	Future
2023	It's Almost Dry	Pusha T
2024	Michael	Killer Mike
2024	Her Loss	Drake and 21 Savage
2024	Heroes & Villains	Metro Boomin
2024	King's Disease III	Nas
2024	Utopia	Travis Scott
2025	Alligator Bites Never Heal	Doechii
2025	The Auditorium Vol. 1	Common and Pete Rock
2025	The Death of Slim Shady (Coup de Grâce)	Eminem
2025	Might Delete Later	J. Cole
2025	We Don't Trust You	Future and Metro Boomin
2026	GNX	Kendrick Lamar
2026	Chromakopia	Tyler, the Creator
2026	Glorious	GloRilla
2026	God Does Like Ugly	JID
2026	Let God Sort Em Out	Clipse
2027	Am I the Drama?	Cardi B
2027	Bully — Deluxe	Kanye West
2027	Dillagence II	Busta Rhymes and J Dilla
2027	Everything Is a Lot	Wale
2027	God Gotta Afro & Gold Hoops	Rapsody
2027	Octane	Don Toliver

^{^[I]} Each year is linked to the article about the Grammy Awards held that year.

== Artists with multiple wins ==
6 wins

- Eminem

4 wins

- Kendrick Lamar
- Kanye West

2 wins

- Outkast
- Tyler, the Creator

== Artists with multiple nominations ==
11 nominations

- Jay-Z

9 nominations

- Kanye West

8 nominations

- Eminem

7 nominations

- Nas
- Drake

5 nominations

- The Roots
- Common
- Kendrick Lamar

4 nominations

- J. Cole (1 with Dreamville)
- Lupe Fiasco
- Missy Elliott
- Tyler, the Creator

3 nominations

- Ludacris
- Nelly
- Q-Tip (2 with A Tribe Called Quest)
- T.I.
- Pusha T (1 with Clipse)

2 nominations

- Nicki Minaj
- Dr. Dre
- Lil Wayne
- LL Cool J
- 50 Cent
- Outkast
- ScHoolboy Q
- A Tribe Called Quest
- 2Pac
- DJ Khaled
- Travis Scott
- 21 Savage
- Future
- Metro Boomin
- JID (1 with Dreamville)
- Cardi B
- Busta Rhymes
- Rapsody

== See also ==
- Grammy Award for Best Rap Performance
- Grammy Award for Best Rap Song
- Hip-hop
