= Hit-Boy =

American record producer (born 1987)

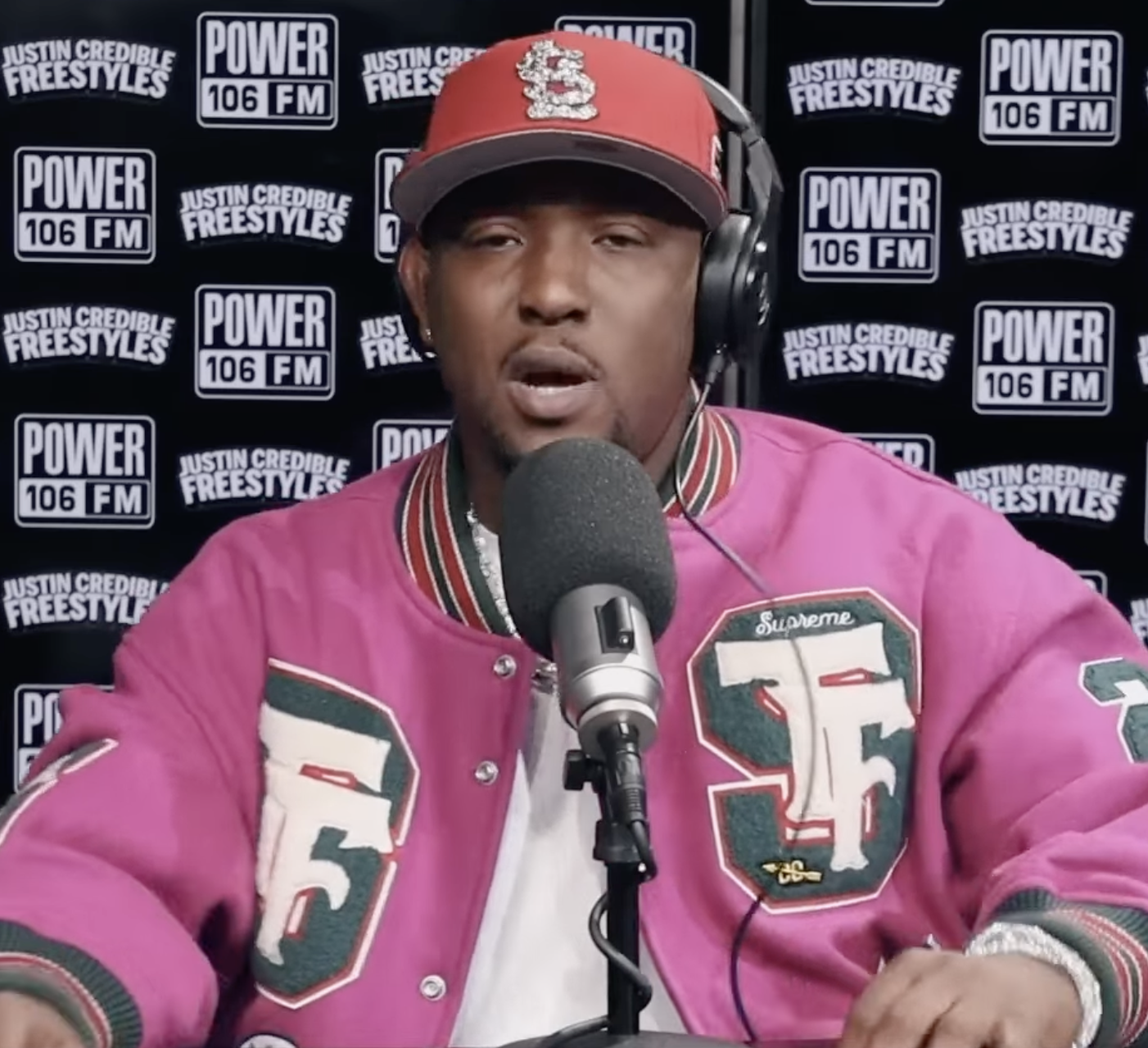
- Hollis in 2026

Background information
- Born: Chauncey Alexander Hollis Jr. May 21, 1987 (age 39); California, U.S.
- Genres: Hip-hop; R&B
- Occupations: Record producer; rapper; songwriter; record executive
- Years active: 2003–present
- Labels: Surf Club Inc.; Hits Since '87; Zone 4; GOOD Music; Interscope; Def Jam
- Website: hit-boy.ai

Chauncey Alexander Hollis Jr. (born May 21, 1987), known professionally as Hit-Boy, is an American music producer, rapper, and record label executive. A three-time Grammy Award winner and eleven-time nominee, he is the founder of Surf Club Inc., an independent label, publishing company, and entertainment company.

He has produced or co-produced charting singles for Jay-Z, Kanye West ("Niggas in Paris"), Travis Scott ("Sicko Mode"), Nipsey Hussle ("Racks in the Middle"), Beyoncé ("Sorry"), Drake ("Trophies"), and Lil Wayne ("Drop the World"); also having helmed the entirety of production on six Nas albums—King's Disease (2020), King's Disease II (2021), Magic, King's Disease III (2022), Magic 2, and Magic 3 (2023). He has released collaborative projects with the Alchemist, Big Sean, and the Game, among others.

He first signed with fellow producer Polow da Don in 2007 as in-house production staff for Don's label Zone 4, and later joined Kanye West's GOOD Music in 2011 to serve a similar role. His first major production credit, Lil Wayne's 2009 single "Drop the World", peaked at number 18 on the Billboard Hot 100. The following year, he produced West and Jay-Z's 2011 single "Niggas in Paris", which peaked at number 5 on the chart and received Diamond certification by the Recording Industry Association of America (RIAA). His record label imprint, Hits Since '87, was founded in 2011 as an imprint of Interscope. In July 2025, with the assistance of Jay-Z and Roc Nation CEO Desiree Perez, he announced his exit from his publishing deal with Universal Music Publishing Group.

== Career ==
=== Early career and Surf Club (2007–2010) ===
Hollis got his start in professional music production upon receiving a message from high-profile record producer Polow da Don on Myspace which read: "Let's get this paper, pimp". He received his first major production credit in tandem with the producer for the 2009 More than a Game documentary soundtrack, which was released by Polow's label Zone 4, to which he signed as an in-house producer. He co-produced the song "Stronger" by Mary J. Blige, which entered the Hot R&B/Hip-Hop Songs chart. Hollis is also a founding member of the collective Surf Club, which he formed with fellow producers Chase N. Cashe, BCarr, and Chili Chill.

=== GOOD Music and breakthrough (2011–2013) ===
While continuing to receive production credits with Zone 4, he became acquainted with rapper Kanye West and produced his 2010 GOOD Friday song, "Christmas in Harlem". On May 2, 2011, he signed to Kanye West's GOOD Music label as an in-house producer, allowing him to work directly with West and the label's further releases. West and Jay-Z's 2011 single "Niggas in Paris" peaked at number 5 on the Billboard Hot 100, won two Grammy Awards (Best Rap Performance and Best Rap Song), and received Diamond certification by the RIAA.

On June 7, 2012, Hollis released his first single as a recording artist, "Jay-Z Interview", which was produced by Bink!. Later in July 2012, Hollis was featured rapping on CyHi the Prynce's mixtape Ivy League Club, on the song "Entourage". Hollis then released the self-produced track "Old School Caddy", which features then-GOOD Music cohort Kid Cudi. These two tracks appeared on his first full-length project, a mixtape titled HITstory, which was released for free download on his website. Also in 2012, he produced three songs from his label GOOD Music's compilation album Cruel Summer, and produced ASAP Rocky's single "Goldie". On December 23, 2012, Hollis secured a solo recording contract with Interscope Records (the former parent label of Zone 4), under the record label Blueprint Group, along with the L.E.P. Bogus Boys. On January 23, 2013, his record label, Hits Since '87, became an imprint of Interscope. On June 29, 2013, he parted ways with GOOD Music, but stated that he was still on good terms with West and his labelmates.

=== Continued production and Half-A-Mil (2014–2019) ===
Throughout this period, Hit-Boy was credited on the Billboard Hot 100-top 50 singles "Trophies" by Drake, "Clique" by GOOD Music, "Sorry" by Beyoncé, and his first to peak the chart: "Sicko Mode" by Travis Scott, among others. He pursued a career as a recording artist while doing so, and signed with Interscope Records to release his debut studio album, We the Plug (2013) in collaboration with his HS87 collective.

Hollis and Los Angeles rapper Dom Kennedy released the joint mixtape Half-A-Mil EP in December 2017, subsequently adopting the name as an alias for the duo. The mixtape consisted of five songs, and was led by the single "100 Rounds". It was followed by the sequel, Half-A-Mil 2 on February 24, 2017, and Half-A-Mil 3 followed thereafter in August 2017. Their debut collaborative album, Courtesy of Half-a-Mil was released in November of that year.

He guest appeared alongside Roddy Ricch on Nipsey Hussle's 2019 single "Racks in the Middle", which won Best Rap Performance at the 62nd Annual Grammy Awards.

=== Nas collaborations and Surf Club era (2020–2024) ===
From 2020 to 2022, Hollis teamed up with Nas to serve as executive producer on the King's Disease series—King's Disease, King's Disease II, and King's Disease III—to close out 2022. King's Disease I and II were consecutively nominated for Best Rap Album of the Year, with the former winning and giving Nas his first Grammy win. They also collaborated on Nas's fifteenth studio album, Magic, in late 2021. He also released the collaborative extended play What You Expect (2021) with Michigan rapper Big Sean, and helmed the entirety of production on Burden of Proof (2020) by Benny the Butcher.

In 2023, Hollis released his albums Surf or Drown in March, which featured guest appearances from Nas, The Alchemist, and Curren$y. Two months later, he followed up with its sequel, Surf or Drown Vol. 2, on Father's Day in June alongside his father, Big Hit, who appears on nine of the ten songs. In May 2023, Big Hit was released from prison after serving nine years and returned to the studio. Before his incarceration in 2014, Big Hit had grown a fanbase following the release of the 2013 singles "Grindin' My Whole Life" and "G'z Don't Cry", both produced by Hit-Boy. Surf or Drown Vol. 2 is a celebration of the reunification of the father-son rap duo. Hollis executive produced Big Hit's debut solo album, The Truth Is In My Eyes (2023).

Hollis also executively produced a number of albums in 2023, including three Nas albums (King's Disease III, Magic 2, and Magic 3), Musiq Soulchild's Victims & Villains, and Benny the Butcher's album Everybody Can't Go (alongside the Alchemist), as well as the Madden NFL 24 video game soundtrack. He worked on two songs from Don Toliver's third album Love Sick, as well as the song "Delresto (Echoes)" by Travis Scott and Beyoncé from Scott's Utopia.

In January 2024, Hollis produced and executive produced the project Paisley Dreams by The Game and Big Hit. The nine-song album was made in one session, the first time the Game and Big Hit had met. Hollis also produced Jennifer Lopez's single "Can't Get Enough" alongside Rogét Chahayed for her eighth album, This Is Me... Now. In May 2024, he released Black & Whites, a collaborative album with The Alchemist and Big Hit.

=== Independence and Surf Club Inc. (2025–present) ===
In July 2025, Hit-Boy publicly announced that he had been released from an 18-year publishing deal with Universal Music Publishing Group, which he had signed at age 19. He credited Jay-Z and Roc Nation CEO Desiree Perez with negotiating his exit from the contract, which he described as having lacked a defined end date. He marked the occasion by releasing "What's the Deal?", his first single following the publishing deal exit, via Surf Club Inc.

In October 2025, Hit-Boy released Goldfish, a collaborative album with The Alchemist, via Surf Club Inc., ALC, and EMPIRE. Hit-Boy serves as founder and chief executive of Surf Club Inc., his independent label, publishing house, and entertainment company.

== Musical style ==
=== Production ===
Hit-Boy uses FL Studio and custom music plug-ins to make his beats.

== Personal life ==
Hollis is the nephew of Rodney Benford, from the R&B group Troop, and the son of rapper Big Hit. He grew up in Fontana, California.

His first child, a son, was born in 2020.

== Discography ==
=== Studio albums ===
List of albums, with selected chart positions
| Title | Album details |
|---|---|
| We the Plug (with HS87) | Released: May 27, 2014; Label: Hits Since '87, Interscope; Format: digital download, streaming |
| Courtesy of Half-a-Mil (with Dom Kennedy) | Released: November 29, 2017; Label: The Other People's Money Company; Formats: digital download, streaming |
| Tony Fontana | Released: May 22, 2018; Label: HS87; Formats: digital download, streaming |
| Family Not a Group (with SOB X RBE) | Released: April 16, 2019; Label: Def Jam; Formats: digital download, streaming |
| The Chauncey Hollis Project | Released: May 1, 2020; Label: HS87; Formats: digital download, streaming |
| Also Known As (with Dom Kennedy) | Released: July 31, 2020; Label: The Other People's Money Company; Formats: digital download, streaming |
| King's Disease (with Nas) | Released: August 21, 2020; Label: Mass Appeal; Formats: CD, LP, digital download, streaming |
| Burden of Proof (with Benny the Butcher) | Released: October 16, 2020; Label: Griselda, Empire; Formats: digital download, streaming |
| King's Disease II (with Nas) | Released: August 6, 2021; Label: Mass Appeal; Formats: CD, LP, digital download, streaming |
| Magic (with Nas) | Released: December 21, 2021; Label: Mass Appeal; Formats: CD, LP, digital download, streaming |
| Bulletproof Soul (with Pacman da Gunman) | Released: March 31, 2022; Label: All Money In No Money Out, Playball Music, OTR; Formats: digital download, streaming |
| Hitgirl (with Dreezy) | Released: May 20, 2022; Label: Dreezy Sound Inc., Empire; Formats: digital download, streaming |
| King's Disease III (with Nas) | Released: November 11, 2022; Label: Mass Appeal; Formats: CD, LP, digital download, streaming |
| Victims & Villains (with Musiq Soulchild) | Released: March 10, 2023; Label: SoulStar Music Company; Formats: digital download, streaming |
| Surf or Drown | Released: March 24, 2023; Label: Surf Club Inc.; Formats: digital download, streaming |
| Surf or Drown, Vol. 2 | Released: June 16, 2023; Label: Surf Club Inc.; Formats: digital download, streaming |
| Magic 2 (with Nas) | Released: July 21, 2023; Label: Mass Appeal; Formats: CD, LP, digital download, streaming |
| Magic 3 (with Nas) | Released: September 14, 2023; Label: Mass Appeal; Formats: CD, LP, digital download, streaming |
| The Truth Is In My Eyes (with Big Hit) | Released: December 16, 2023; Label: Surf Club Inc.; Formats: digital download, physical |
| Paisley Dreams (with The Game & Big Hit) | Released: January 1, 2024; Label: Surf Club Inc., STB Entertainment; Formats: digital download, streaming |
| Rent Due (with LaRussell) | Released: February 23, 2024; Label: Good Compenny; Formats: digital download, streaming |
| Black & Whites (with The Alchemist and Big Hit) | Released: May 30, 2024; Label: ALC, Surf Club Inc.; Formats: CD, LP, digital download, streaming |
| Rent Paid (with LaRussell) | Released: February 14, 2025; Label: Good Compenny; Formats: digital download, streaming |
| High-Class Wiggler (with Spank Nitti James) | Released: June 13, 2025; Label: Wiggle National, R Baron; Formats: digital download, streaming |
| Goldfish (with The Alchemist) | Released: October 24, 2025; Label: ALC, Surf Club Inc., EMPIRE; Formats: CD, LP, digital download, streaming |
| Yeast Talkin' (with Spank Nitti James) | Released: November 27, 2025; Label: Surf Club Inc.; Formats: digital download, streaming |

=== EPs ===
| Title | Details |
|---|---|
| Half-a-Mil EP (with Dom Kennedy) | Released: December 10, 2016; Label: The Other People's Money Company; Formats: digital download |
| Half-a-Mil-2 EP (with Dom Kennedy) | Released: February 24, 2017; Label: The Other People's Money Company; Formats: digital download |
| Half-a-Mil-3 EP (with Dom Kennedy) | Released: August 7, 2017; Label: The Other People's Money Company; Formats: digital download |
| This Wasn't Supposed to Happen (with Jay Park) | Released: November 15, 2019; Labels: Roc Nation, AOMG; Format: digital download |
| What You Expect (with Big Sean) | Released: October 29, 2021; Label: FF to Def, Def Jam; Formats: digital download, streaming |

=== Mixtapes ===
| Title | Details |
|---|---|
| A Hit-Boy Christmas | Released: December 24, 2010; Label: HS87; Format: Digital download |
| Love Notes | Released: February 14, 2011; Label: HS87; Format: Digital download |
| HITstory | Released: August 7, 2012; Label: HS87, GOOD; Format: Digital download |
| All I've Ever Dreamed Of (with HS87) | Released: March 12, 2013; Label: HS87, Interscope; Format: Digital download |
| Zoomin | Released: September 2, 2015; Label: HS87; Format: Digital download |
| Tony Fontana | Released: May 22, 2018; Label: HS87; Format: Digital download |

== Awards and nominations ==
=== Publication awards and nominations ===
| Year | Nominated work | Award | Result |
|---|---|---|---|
| 2014 | Himself (Grindin My Whole Life) | Producer of the Year | Nominated |
| 2020 | Hit-Boy | BET Awards: Producer of the Year | Won |
| 2020 | Hit-Boy | Complex Awards: Best Hip Hop Producer Alive | Won |
| 2020 | Hit-Boy | HipHopDX Producer of the Year | Won |
| 2021 | Hit-Boy | XXL Awards: Hip Hop Producer of the Year | Nominated |
| 2021 | Hit-Boy | BET Awards: Producer of the Year | Won |
| 2021 | Hit-Boy | NAACP Image Awards: Producer of the Year | Won |
| 2022 | Hit-Boy | BET Awards: Producer of the Year | Nominated |
| 2022 | Hit-Boy | XXL Awards: Hip Hop Producer of the Year | Won |
| 2022 | Hit-Boy | HipHopDX Producer of the Year | Won |

=== Grammy Awards ===
The Grammy Awards is an award presented by The Recording Academy to recognize achievement in the mainly English-language music industry. Hit-Boy has received three Grammy Awards from eleven nominations.

| Year | Nominated work | Award | Result |
|---|---|---|---|
| 2013 | "Niggas in Paris" | Best Rap Song | Won |
| 2014 | Good Kid, M.A.A.D City | Album of the Year | Nominated |
| 2015 | Beyoncé | Album of the Year | Nominated |
| 2017 | Lemonade | Album of the Year | Nominated |
| 2019 | "Sicko Mode" | Best Rap Song | Nominated |
| 2020 | "Racks in the Middle" | Best Rap Song | Nominated |
| 2020 | "Racks in the Middle" | Best Rap Performance | Won |
| 2021 | "Deep Reverence" | Best Rap Song | Nominated |
| 2021 | King's Disease | Best Rap Album | Won |
| 2022 | King's Disease II | Best Rap Album | Nominated |
| 2022 | Himself | Producer of the Year, Non-Classical | Nominated |
| 2023 | Renaissance | Album of the Year | Nominated |
| 2024 | King's Disease III | Best Rap Album | Nominated |
| 2024 | Himself | Producer of the Year, Non-Classical | Nominated |
