= King's Disease II =

Studio album by Nas
- Released: August 6, 2021
- Genre: Hip hop
- Length: 51:25
- Label: Mass Appeal
- Producer: Hit-Boy; B. Carr; Brian Alexander Morgan; Corbett; Eminem; Ezreaux; Jansport J; Rogét

Nas chronology
King's Disease (2020)	King's Disease II (2021)	Magic (2021)

Singles from King's Disease II
- 1. "Rare" Released: August 6, 2021; 2. "Brunch on Sundays" Released: September 14, 2021

King's Disease II is the thirteenth studio album by American rapper Nas. It was released on August 6, 2021, through Mass Appeal Records. Serving as a sequel to his 2020 album King's Disease, it features guest appearances from Eminem, EPMD, A Boogie wit da Hoodie, YG, Lauryn Hill, Charlie Wilson, Blxst, JaboodyDubs and Hit-Boy. As with the previous record, it was executive produced by Nas and Hit-Boy.

The album received widespread acclaim from critics, who praised its storytelling and cohesive production, and commended featured verses from Lauryn Hill on "Nobody" and Eminem on "EPMD 2". At the 64th Annual Grammy Awards, the album was nominated in the Best Rap Album category.

== Background ==
Nas announced the album along with its title, cover art, and release date on July 29, 2021. He shared the tracklist on August 3, 2021. The first single off the album is "Rare", released with a music video directed by Savannah Setten.

== Critical reception ==
Professional ratings
Aggregate scores
Source	Rating
Metacritic	86/100
Review scores
Source	Rating
AllMusic	4/5 stars
Clash	7/10
Exclaim!	8/10
The Independent	5/5 stars
The Line of Best Fit	9/10
NME	5/5 stars
Pitchfork	6.1/10

King's Disease II was met with widespread critical acclaim. At Metacritic, which assigns a normalized rating out of 100 to reviews from professional publications, the album received an average score of 86, based on 10 reviews. Will Lavin of NME wrote that "Nas appears more focused than ever before", complimenting his "emotional candour" and comfortability over contemporary trap production. For The Independent, Annabel Nugent stated that King's Disease II "finds Nas where he has always been – comfortable in himself and at ease with confronting his past", noting the chemistry between Nas and Hit-Boy's production. Nugent concluded: "The features lend themselves well to a record that captures nostalgia without devolving into anachronism or retrograde – a fine line that Nas is well-versed in toeing."

Reviewing the album for AllMusic, Fred Thomas claimed "King's Disease II bests its predecessor. Hit-Boy takes on the production once more, but instead of relying mainly on throwback beats and wistful nostalgia, this installment of the series is darker, moodier, and more direct. Hit-Boy's beats are often tense and atmospheric, giving the album a cinematic feel as Nas leans harder into storytelling with his lyricism. He still spends time examining the past, but it's more of a history lesson than a fond remembrance." In Exclaim!, Luke Fox mentioned that "King Nas serves up another reminder that he's no pretender to the throne. The wild ambition has just evolved into calculated wisdom." Concluding the review for Line of Best Fit, Chase McMullen noted that "Nas has crafted an album designated the only would it could be to escape such criticism: an impenetrable one. There's not an ounce of fat, not a wasted moment, not a single beat that doesn't suit its purpose to the letter. It's a monolithic testament to a rapper tired of being treated as both the victor and the underdog at once. It's undeniably clear just which one he is here. King's Disease II is a victory lap that nonetheless never lets up its pace."

The album received a nomination for a Grammy Award for Best Rap Album at the 64th Annual Grammy Awards.

== Commercial performance ==
King's Disease II debuted at number-three on the US Billboard 200, becoming Nas's highest-charting album in nine years, and his 15th top 10 entry on the chart. The album also debuted at number-one on both US Top R&B/Hip-Hop Albumschart selling 56,000 total album-equivalent units within its first week of release. King's Disease II's first-week sales number topped the sales of its predecessor, which sold over 47,000 copies and debuted at number five on the Billboard 200. It also performed well internationally, reaching the top 10 in Canada and Switzerland, becoming Nas' highest-charting album in the latter region.

== Track listing ==
King's Disease II track listing
No.	Title	Writer(s)	Producer(s)	Length
1.	"The Pressure"	Nasir Jones; Chauncey Hollis Jr.; Dustin James Corbett; Quentin Miller	Hit-Boy; Corbett	3:07
2.	"Death Row East"	Jones; Hollis; Corbett; Strange Punch	Hit-Boy; Corbett	3:20
3.	"40 Side"	Jones; Hollis	Hit-Boy	2:40
4.	"EPMD 2" (featuring Eminem and EPMD)	Jones; Marshall B. Mathers III; Erick Sermon; Parrish J. Smith; Hollis	Hit-Boy; Eminem	3:34
5.	"Rare"	Jones; Hollis; Corbett	Hit-Boy; Corbett	3:26
6.	"YKTV" (featuring A Boogie wit da Hoodie and YG with JaboodyDubs)	Jones; Artist Dubose; Keenon Jackson; Hollis; Corbett	Hit-Boy; Corbett	3:23
7.	"Store Run"	Jones; Hollis	Hit-Boy; Ezreaux	3:19
8.	"Moments"	Jones; Hollis; Justin Keith Williams	Hit-Boy; Jansport J	4:11
9.	"Nobody" (featuring Ms. Lauryn Hill)	Jones; Hill; Hollis; Corbett; Joshua Strange	Hit-Boy; Corbett	4:42
10.	"No Phony Love" (featuring Charlie Wilson)	Jones; Hollis; Williams	Hit-Boy; Jansport J; Brian Alexander Morgan	3:05
11.	"Brunch on Sundays" (featuring Blxst)	Jones; Matthew Burdette; Hollis; Derrick Carrington Gray; Corbett; Rogét Chahayed; Mark Steven Evitts; Nicholas Leon Race; Shawn Jerritt	Hit-Boy; Corbett; Rogét	3:51
12.	"Count Me In"	Jones; Hollis; Brandon Carrier	Hit-Boy; B. Carr	3:17
13.	"Composure" (featuring Hit-Boy)	Jones; Hollis; Chahayed; Earl Taylor; Shaka Senghor	Hit-Boy; Rogét	3:23
14.	"My Bible"	Jones; Hollis	Hit-Boy	3:48
15.	"Nas Is Good"	Jones; Hollis	Hit-Boy	2:19
Total length:				51:25

Notes

- YKTV features additional voices by Justin Davison of Jaboody Dubs/Jaboody Show from Youtube and Twitch.
- "The Pressure" & "Death Row East" features additional vocals by Don Toliver
- "40 Side" features additional vocals by Lil Baby
- "Composure" features uncredited vocals by Shaka Senghor
- ”My Bible” features uncredited vocals by Nipsey Hussle
- "EPMD 2" is a remix version from the soundtrack Judas and the Black Messiah

== Personnel ==
- Mike Bozzi – mastering engineer
- David Kim – mixer, recording engineer
- Hit-Boy – recording engineer
- Mike Strange – recording engineer (4)
- Tony Campana – recording engineer (4)
- Alexis Estevez – recording engineer (6)
- Julian Miller – recording engineer, vocal editing (9)
- Ms. Lauryn Hill – recording engineer, vocal editing (9)
- Evan Di Pietro – recording engineer (10)
- Marvin Delgado – assistant engineer
- Don Toliver – background vocals (1)
- Garren – background vocals (2)
- James Fauntleroy – background vocals (8)
- Charlie Wilson – lead vocals (10)
- Blxst – lead vocals (11)
- BJ the Chicago Kid – background vocals (14)

== Charts ==
=== Weekly charts ===
Chart performance for King's Disease II
Chart (2021)	Peak position
Australian Albums (ARIA)	28
Austrian Albums (Ö3 Austria)	48
Belgian Albums (Ultratop Flanders)	27
Belgian Albums (Ultratop Wallonia)	78
Canadian Albums (Billboard)	9
Dutch Albums (Album Top 100)	18
German Albums (Offizielle Top 100)	52
Irish Albums (IRMA)	52
New Zealand Albums (RMNZ)	29
Norwegian Albums (VG-lista)	40
Swiss Albums (Schweizer Hitparade)	6
UK Albums (OCC)	20
UK Independent Albums (OCC)	6
UK R&B Albums (OCC)	4
US Billboard 200	3
US Top R&B/Hip-Hop Albums (Billboard)	1

=== Year-end charts ===
Year-end chart performance for King's Disease II
Chart (2021)	Position
US Top R&B/Hip-Hop Albums (Billboard)	96
