= King's Disease =

Studio album by Nas
- Released: August 21, 2020
- Recorded: 2020
- Genres: East Coast hip-hop; R&B; trap
- Length: 38:24
- Label: Mass Appeal
- Producers: Hit-Boy; Audio Anthem; Corbett; Cyanca; G. Ry; Haze; J. Pelham; Pat Junior; Penthouse Parti; Rogét Chahayed; MonoNeon

Nas chronology
The Lost Tapes 2 (2019)	King's Disease (2020)	King's Disease II (2021)

Singles from King's Disease
- 1. "Ultra Black" Released: August 14, 2020

King's Disease is the twelfth studio album by American rapper Nas. It was released on August 21, 2020, through Mass Appeal Records. It succeeds his eleventh album, Nasir, released two years prior. The album features guest appearances from Charlie Wilson, Hit-Boy, Big Sean, Don Toliver, Lil Durk, Anderson .Paak, Brucie B, Nas's supergroup the Firm, Fivio Foreign, and ASAP Ferg.

King's Disease received generally positive reviews and was viewed by music critics as a return to form following the muted reception for Nasir (2018).

The album won the Grammy Award for Best Rap Album at the 63rd Annual Grammy Awards, becoming Nas' first Grammy. The album's sequel, King's Disease II, was released on August 6, 2021 and is Nas's first release to be marketed by Sony Music (through The Orchard subsidiary) since the release of Street's Disciple in 2004.

== Background ==
Following the release of his eleventh studio album Nasir, Nas stated that he would be working on an unfinished album produced by Swizz Beatz and RZA, who both contributed to Nas' compilation album The Lost Tapes 2 in 2019. However, on August 10, 2020, Nas announced via Instagram he would be releasing a different album produced and executive produced by American record producer Hit-Boy, which would become known as King's Disease. Four days later, on August 14, Nas released the album's lead and only single, "Ultra Black", featuring Hit-Boy.

=== Music videos ===
The official music video for the album's final track and only bonus track, "Spicy", featuring American rappers Fivio Foreign and ASAP Ferg, was released on October 2, 2020. The official music video for "Replace Me", featuring American rapper Big Sean and American singer Don Toliver, was released on October 21.

== Critical reception ==
Professional ratings
Aggregate scores
Source	Rating
Metacritic	72/100
Review scores
Source	Rating
AllMusic	3.3/5 stars
Clash	8/10
Consequence of Sound	B+
Exclaim!	7/10
HipHopDX	4.1/5
NME	4/5 stars
Pitchfork	6.3/10
Rolling Stone	2.5/5 stars
Tom Hull – on the Web	B+

King's Disease was met with generally positive reviews from music critics. At Metacritic, which assigns a normalized rating out of 100 from mainstream publications, the album received an average score of 72, based on nine reviews.

Andy Kellman of AllMusic felt that the album was an improvement from the rapper's work in recent years, writing: "Nas is more ruminative and measured, like he's found his stride again, even as he flagrantly contradicts himself and waylays men and women with relationship advice that rings hollow. Going strictly by the conviction and feeling in each line, King's Disease is the MC's best work since 2008." Robin Murray of Clash wrote: "'The King's Disease' finds Nas grappling with a raft of contradictions, contrasting the opulence of his lifestyle with the need for vitality in his message," adding that "it's not perfect, but it's less an end product, and more the search for creative process – by the end, you become convinced the Queens rapper has found his throne." Okla Jones of Consequence of Sound praised the album for its cohesion and production, writing that King's Disease "delivers a feel appropriate for the times" and "hits the mark as being one of the better rap albums of the year." Similarly, Riley Wallace of HipHopDX wrote: "The creative process seems more organized and thought out, allowing Nas to do all the things he's good at, without embellishing any of them."

Reviewing for NME, Will Lavin appraised the album for its lyricism, claiming that the album's lyrics demand "high levels of dissection" and that the album is an "acutely perceptive and culturally relevant body of work that finds its author willing to try out new ideas." He concluded by writing: "There's a genuine conversation to be had about whether it's the best rap album of the year so far."

In a more mixed review, Pete Tosiello of Pitchfork wrote that the album "marks a retreat into a nostalgia-act comfort zone—one which suits Nas, even as it yields diminishing returns." Ryan Feyre of RapReviews.com wrote that the album's biggest missed opportunity lies in "Nas’ inability to reach beyond the ambitious presentation found in everything surrounding the lyrics," adding that "he's entertaining in spurts, but much like his 'godly' contemporary Jay-Z, one has to wonder if what he says ever really matters on King's Disease anymore." Danny Schwartz of Rolling Stone called the album a "slick Illmatic redux" and a "fresh portrait of Nas' now-mythical hustler years," but criticized the album for attempting to "paper over" the rapper's abuse allegations and showcasing his "increasingly questionable politics when it comes to women," concluding by writing: "26 years after Illmatic, Nas still has room to grow."

== Commercial performance ==
King's Disease debuted at number five on the US Billboard 200 with 47,000 album-equivalent units, of which 18,000 were pure album sales. It serves as Nas's fourteenth top-ten album in the United States.

The album's last track and only bonus track, "Spicy", featuring American rappers Fivio Foreign and ASAP Ferg reached number 96 on the US Billboard Hot 100 and number 36 on the Hot R&B/Hip-Hop Songs chart, and the track "Replace Me" with Big Sean and Don Toliver reached number 49 on the Hot R&B/Hip-Hop Songs chart.

== Track listing ==
All lyrics are written by Nas, Hit-Boy, and their collaborators; all music is composed by Hit-Boy.

No.	Title	Writer(s)	Producer(s)	Length
1.	"King's Disease"	Nasir Jones; Chauncey Hollis	Hit-Boy; Corbett^{[a]}; J. Pelham^{[b]}; Pat Junior^{[b]}; Cyanca^{[b]}	1:52
2.	"Blue Benz"	Jones; Hollis	Hit-Boy; Penthouse Parti^{[a]}; Rogét Chahayed^{[a]}	2:21
3.	"Car #85" (featuring Charlie Wilson)	Jones; Charles Wilson; Hollis	Hit-Boy	3:29
4.	"Ultra Black" (featuring Hit-Boy)	Jones; Hollis	Hit-Boy; Audio Anthem^{[a]}; Corbett^{[c]}	3:19
5.	"27 Summers"	Jones; Hollis	Hit-Boy; Rogét Chahayed^{[a]}	1:43
6.	"Replace Me" (featuring Big Sean and Don Toliver)	Jones; Sean Anderson; Caleb Toliver; Hollis; Rashad Muhammad; Ella Mai; Varren Wade; Quintin Q Gulledge; Dijon McFarlane	Hit-Boy; Haze^{[a]}; Eric Choice^{[c]}	2:51
7.	"Til the War Is Won" (featuring Lil Durk)	Jones; Durk Banks; Hollis	Hit-Boy	3:22
8.	"All Bad" (featuring Anderson .Paak)	Jones; Brandon Anderson; Nicholas Race; Hollis	Hit-Boy; Dwayne "MnoNeon" Thomas Jr.^{[b]}	3:49
9.	"The Definition" (featuring Brucie B)	Jones; Brucie Robinson; Hollis	Hit-Boy	2:01
10.	"Full Circle" (featuring the Firm)	Jones; Anthony Cruz; Inga Marchand; Cory McKay; Robin Thicke; Hollis; Ryan Martinez	Hit-Boy; G. Ry^{[a]}	3:52
11.	"10 Points"	Jones; Hollis	Hit-Boy	3:05
12.	"The Cure"	Jones; Hollis	Hit-Boy	3:53
13.	"Spicy" (bonus track) (featuring Fivio Foreign and ASAP Ferg)	Jones; Maxie Ryles III; Darold Ferguson, Jr.; Hollis; Derrick Grey	Hit-Boy	2:47
Total length:				38:24

Notes

- ^{^[a]} signifies a co-producer
- ^{^[b]} signifies an additional producer
- ^{^[c]} signifies an uncredited co-producer
- ”Ultra Black” features additional vocals by Corbett, Jon Lewis and Ashlee.
- "Full Circle" features additional vocals by Robin Thicke and uncredited vocals by Dr. Dre.

Sample credits

- "Blue Benz" contains a monologue by Louie Rankin in the 1998 film Belly.
- "Replace Me" contains interpolations of "Trip", written by Ella Mai Howell, Varren Wade, Quintin Q Gulledge and Dijon MacFarlane, and performed by Ella Mai.
- "Til the War Is Won" contains a sample of "Agape" performed by Nicholas Britell in the 2018 film If Beale Street Could Talk.

== Personnel ==
Musicians

- MonoNeon – Electric Bass, Additional Producer: credited as Dwayne "MnoNeon" Thomas Jr. (track 8)

Technical

- Hit-Boy – engineer (all tracks)
- Mark "Exit" Goodchild – engineer (all tracks)
- Gabriel Zardes – engineer (all tracks)
- David Kim – mixing (all tracks)
- Ramon Rivas – mixing assistance
- Mike Bozzi – mastering (all tracks)

Artwork

- Harmonia Rosales – artist

Label

- Peter Bittenbender – CEO & Creative Direction
- Annie Chen – VP of Marketing
- Celeste Li – Marketing

== Charts ==
Chart performance for King's Disease
Chart (2020)	Peak position
Australian Albums (ARIA)	58
Belgian Albums (Ultratop Flanders)	59
Canadian Albums (Billboard)	12
Dutch Albums (Album Top 100)	52
Swiss Albums (Schweizer Hitparade)	16
UK Albums (Official Charts)	24
UK R&B Albums (Official Charts)	1
US Billboard 200	5
