= Made You Look (Nas song) =

Single by Nas

from the album God's Son
- B-side: "The Cross"
- Released: September 22, 2002
- Recorded: 2002
- Genre: Hip-hop
- Length: 3:23
- Label: Ill Will; Columbia
- Songwriters: Nasir Jones; Salaam Remi
- Producer: Salaam Remi

Nas singles chronology
"One Mic" (2002)	"Made You Look" (2002)	"Thugz Mansion" (2002)

"Made You Look" is the first single from Nas' 2002 album, God's Son. Built around several samples lifted from the Incredible Bongo Band's "Apache", the single was important in establishing Nas' direction following his battle with Jay-Z and the Stillmatic album in its reliance on intricate lyricism and an old-school aesthetic. The song reached much commercial success, on the level of "I Can", and it was a sizeable hit among urban audiences and remains one of the more popular tracks on the God's Son album. It is his third highest charting single to date.

Lyrically "Made You Look" is similar to much of the material Nas was releasing in the early 2000s (decade) with its loose, complex, free-associative rhymes conveying obscure, wide-ranging themes: partying, boasting, hyping Nas and his legacy.

The beat for "Made You Look" was also used on the song "In My Bed" by British singer Amy Winehouse from her 2003 album Frank. Both songs were produced by Salaam Remi.

The official remix features new additional verses by Jadakiss and Ludacris.

== Acclaim ==
- Q ranked it as the 903rd best song ever in 2003.

== Track listing ==
=== A-side ===
1. "Made You Look" (Explicit Version) (3:22)
2. "Made You Look" (Instrumental with Guns) (3:14)

=== B-side ===
1. "The Cross" (Explicit Version) (3:47)
  - Produced by Eminem
2. "The Cross" (Instrumental) (3:47)

== Charts ==
=== Weekly charts ===
Chart (2002–2003)	Peak position
UK Singles (Official Charts)	27
US Billboard Hot 100	32
US Hot R&B/Hip-Hop Songs (Billboard)	12
US R&B/Hip-Hop Airplay (Billboard)	11
US Hot Rap Songs (Billboard)	9
US Rhythmic Airplay (Billboard)	32

=== Year-end charts ===
Chart (2003)	Position
US Hot R&B/Hip-Hop Songs (Billboard)	67
