= One Mic =

Single by Nas

from the album Stillmatic
- Released: April 16, 2002
- Recorded: 2001
- Genre: Hip hop; conscious hip hop
- Length: 4:28
- Label: Ill Will; Columbia
- Songwriters: Nasir Jones; Chucky Thompson
- Producers: Nasir Jones; Chucky Thompson

Nas singles chronology
"I'm Gonna Be Alright" (Track Masters Remix) (2002)	"One Mic" (2002)	"Made You Look" (2002)

"One Mic" is a song by American rapper Nas, released April 16, 2002 on Columbia Records and distributed through Ill Will Records in the United States. It was issued as the third single from his fifth studio album, Stillmatic (2001). The single peaked at number 43 on the Billboard Hot 100, making it Nas's third top-fifty hit on the chart.

== Music and production ==
Production for "One Mic" was handled by Nas and hip hop producer Chucky Thompson. Talking about the inspiration for the song, Nas stated: "I'm a huge fan of Phil Collins and I just wanted to take the vibe from 'In the Air Tonight'." Steve Juon of RapReviews wrote that the song features a production technique previously implemented by such hip hop artists as Outkast and the Roots, which he described as "a quiet groove that steadily increases in energy and intensity until an increasingly amped Nas lets his lyrical rage boil over like a Final Fantasy fighter smacked ONCE too often." According to Nick Butler, the song's structure "slowly build[s] up from a simple 'In the Air Tonight' sample toward the full production ... like hearing two mini hip-hop versions of 'Stairway to Heaven', before Nas flips the script for the third verse and does the same thing in reverse."

According to Juon, the final verse has a reversal of this formula, in which Nas "goes from amped up to soft-spoken, drawing you even closer into his rap." "One Mic" begins with a slow, deliberate flow and beat. Music critic Brett Berliner wrote "'One Mic' starts out with a slow beat reminiscent of a crappy R&B song. Throughout the song, Nas' lazy flow turns into an angry rant over a fast paced beat, and finally a siren."

== Lyrics and themes ==
The lyrics of "One Mic" discuss Nas's desire for a simple life ("Only if I had one gun, one girl, and one crib/One God to show me how to do things his son did") and obstacles that prevent it ("[if] One ni**ga front, my face on the front page"), and a lifestyle in which Nas proclaims "All I need is one mic - fuck the cars, the jewelry". It has been noted by music writers for its political consciousness and dystopian themes. Keith Harris of City Pages described the lyrical structure of "One Mic" as "urban claustrophobia distilled and digitized, with Nas's reportorial eye zooming in on a detail, then pulling back to a panoramic overview." Music critic Cynthia Fuchs described the song's lyrical scheme as "building slowly to a crescendo of declaration and rage, then coming back, to seek a way to make a difference, with that precious one mic."

In an interview for Rolling Stone, Nas discussed the theme of the song, stating "'One Mic' is just about the power. It's almost like Hip Hop is Dead in its infant stages, saying how much this is a blessing to be out here, speaking about what's happening in my neighborhood, having the whole world understand and relate." He also referred to commentator Bill O'Reilly's criticism of "Shoot 'Em Up", a song from Nas's fourth album Nastradamus (1999), as he stated "If I didn't have a microphone, I could never talk about 'Shoot 'Em Up', and I was talking about Queens, New York, being shot up. What do I have to do to get somebody to turn around and hear what I'm saying and take it serious? I'm not here just to be in your face talking nonsense, we're talking about reality. For him to be upset or people like him to be upset is insane to me. It just shows how ignorant people are." In the interview, Nas continued to discuss his inspiration and the song's lyrical theme, stating:

'One Mic' just gives me the ability, no matter how much ignorant people are mad that I'm exposing or talking about our country, no matter what the language is, I'm talking in a language that the people can hear, I'm not sugar-coating it. So if it scares people and people feel guilty, people feel like they've got to make up excuses to why the world's this way, no matter what they say, like they've got their mic, I've got mine, and that's what that song's about.

In the song, Nas also asks God to forgive him for his sins. In the hip hop book Beats, Rhymes & Life (2007), music writer Ytasha Womack compared Nas's lyrics on "One Mic" to the work of rapper Tupac Shakur, analyzing it as a song with strong religious, Christian overtones and lyrical themes. Womack wrote that "Nas's references ultimately humanized Jesus, with attempts to show direct parallels between our quest and that of the Wayshower." Womack concluded with analyzing the incorporation of religious themes by Nas in his composition, stating "Nas clung to spiritual questioning, expressing a desire to be like the early mystics, in order to possess their knowledge and powers. While he expresses that he has the potential of the greats, in 'One Mic' he asks God to show him how to do things his son did. Nas intertwined his day–to–day life and decisions with the pressures felt by Jesus and others, doing so almost as a means to somehow transfer their spiritual gifts to himself."

== Release and reception ==
When "One Mic" was released as a single, it entered the Billboard Hot 100 at number 79 on April 20, 2002, ultimately peaking at number 43. On June 8, it debuted on the Hot Rap Tracks chart at number 9, before eventually reaching number 7. The single also peaked on the Hot Rap Singles at number 23, the Rhythmic Top 40 at number 32, and the Hot R&B/Hip-Hop Singles & Tracks at number 14. A remix of "One Mic", featuring a sample of Mtume's "Juicy Fruit" (1983), was later released on the remix album From Illmatic to Stillmatic: The Remixes (2002).

"One Mic" was well received by critics, some of whom hailed it as a "classic". Marc L. Hill from PopMatters cited it as Stillmatic's "standout track", calling Nas "our magnificently human rap god." Exclaim! magazine's Del F. Cowie described "One Mic" as the album's "centrepiece epic", while Butler cited "One Mic" as "the best rap song of this decade". Writing for Sputnikmusic, he said the song "blew me away on first listen, and it's still having the same effect now. Not many rap songs can send chills up my spine. This is one of them." Brett Berliner from Stylus Magazine was particularly favorable of the song's use of a siren, as he called the concept "truly incredible, and one of the best ideas for a song I’ve ever heard in my life." Steven Potter of the Journal Sentinel called the song a "testament to the lyrical skill only the best emcees possess." Yahoo! Music's James Poletti felt it was "some of the best hip-hop recorded" in 2002. Kathryn McGuire from Rolling Stone was more critical, writing that "the hyperbolic urgency of 'One Mic' feels staged."

In retrospect, IGN's Jon Robinson viewed "One Mic" as a comeback for Nas, writing that it "proved that he was still not only one of the dopest MCs in the world, but possibly the most gifted writer of the rap community." According to Juon, the song signalled a return for Nas to his early musical roots, stating "you know that the rapper we all once called Nasty Nas has truly returned." In 2005, "One Mic" was ranked number 54 on About.com's list of the 100 Greatest Rap Songs.

== Music video ==
A music video for "One Mic" was directed by Chris Robinson and released on December 17, 2001, receiving heavy rotation on MTV, and 2002 MTV Video Music Award nominations for Best Rap Video and Video of the Year. Robinson said in an interview with MTV that he wanted to feature references to the 1976 Soweto uprising in a music video, ultimately persuading Nas to include it in the video for the song. After the September 11, 2001 attacks, the video's production ran into difficulties due to the restrictions on international travel. The scene in the video of the riots was instead filmed in Los Angeles with participants from a local inner-city baseball team playing the rioters. The scene of the rock being thrown in the direction of the camera was taken over 10 times (the actor "had a bit of a curve on his throwing arm," according to Robinson) before post-production work managed to complete the desired effect. Robinson also told his director of photography to open and close the shutters of the camera in the apartment scene, creating an effect of blurred streaks of light.

The video begins with a montage of scenes from inner-city areas of New York City, followed by a camera shot of an apartment window in which a light has just been turned on. The video then centralizes upon a view of Nas reflectively rapping with a single microphone in a bare apartment room. While Nas is rapping, the video switches to a scene of a routine police stop of four suspects which quickly escalates to an on-foot chase of the suspects by police as a surprised elder bystander "fiend drops his Heineken" onto the asphalt. The suspects and the police dramatically part around Nas, who is rapping in the middle of the street, as they continue the chase around a corner. As Nas shouts "The Time is Now!", the scene cuts back to Nas rapping in the barren apartment room with the microphone.

The video transitions to a scene in Soweto at the beginning of the 1976 uprising, in which a protester rallies a crowd of residents against the government while baton-wielding black and white soldiers of the SADF prepare for the impending crackdown on the protesters. Gradually, the scene escalates to violence, with the impetus being a rock thrown in the direction of the camera. Soon, the two sides clash on the dirt road, and Nas pauses to a steady iteration of "One Mic" while standing contrastedly in the middle of the ongoing violence, the scene ending with the silent scream (symbolized by a descending piano) of a little bystanding Soweto girl as the scene cuts back to Nas, in the apartment room, kicking the chair and launching headfirst into a full-blown litany. The Soweto scene is interpolated with various scenes of young people listening and lip-syncing the lyrics, including a teenager wearing headphones in an apartment bedroom beside her younger sister, a group of Latino men sitting in a car and a young, angry Los Angeles County prisoner behind bars. Gradually, as the camera overlays a view of Nas upon the forward-moving shot of a street, the video then calms down alongside the descending tone of the song, the facial determination of Nas and other participants in the video remaining visible as the video draws to a close with the light in the apartment window turning off.

== Track listing ==
A-Side

1. "One Mic" (Explicit) (4:28)
2. "One Mic" (Clean) (4:32)

B-Side

1. "One Mic" (Instrumental) (4:36)
2. "2nd Childhood" (Explicit) (3:51)
  - Produced by DJ Premier

== Charts ==
=== Weekly charts ===
Chart (2002)	Peak position
US Bubbling Under Hot 100 (Billboard)	1
US Billboard Hot 100	43
US Hot R&B/Hip-Hop Songs (Billboard)	14
US R&B/Hip-Hop Airplay (Billboard)	15
US Hot Rap Songs (Billboard)	9
US Hot Rap Tracks (Billboard)	7
US Rhythmic Airplay (Billboard)	32

Chart (2003)	Peak position
Belgium (Ultratop 50 Flanders); Remix featuring Brainpower	28
Netherlands (Dutch Top 40); Remix featuring Brainpower	17
Netherlands (Single Top 100); Remix featuring Brainpower	12

=== Year-end charts ===
Chart (2002)	Position
US Hot R&B/Hip-Hop Songs (Billboard)	74
