= Oochie Wally =

Single by Nas and Bravehearts

from the album Nas & Ill Will Records Presents QB's Finest
- Released: January 6, 2001
- Recorded: 2000
- Genre: Dirty rap
- Length: 3:57
- Label: Ill Will Records, Columbia Records
- Producer: Ez Elpee

Nas singles chronology
"Thank God I Found You (Make It Last Remix)" (2000)	"Oochie Wally" (2001)	"Rule" (2001)

The Bravehearts singles chronology
"Oochie Wally" (2001)	"Quick to Back Down" (2003)

Oochie Wally is a collaborative single by American rapper Nas and East Coast hip hop group Bravehearts. It was released on January 6, 2001, by Ill Will Records and Columbia Records as the second single for the compilation album Nas & Ill Will Records Presents QB's Finest (2000). The song is referenced in Jay-Z's diss song "Takeover". The female vocalist on the hook was later revealed to be Shelene Thomas.

The song features a sample of 'Bambooji' by Gong which originally featured on their 1976 album Shamal.

== Chart performance ==
"Oochie Wally" was a crossover hit in the U.S., peaking at number 26 on the Billboard Hot 100.

== Remixes ==
In August 2018, the song's instrumental was used by American rapper J. Cole in "Album of the Year (Freestyle)". Following this, a freestyle was also released by British rapper SL and another one by British singer Stefflon Don.

== Charts ==
=== Weekly charts ===
Chart (2001)	Peak position
Netherlands (Single Top 100)	11
UK Singles (OCC)	30
US Billboard Hot 100	26
US Hot R&B/Hip-Hop Songs (Billboard)	11
US Hot Rap Songs (Billboard)	2

=== Year-end charts ===
Chart (2001)	Position
US Billboard Hot 100	98
US Hot R&B/Hip-Hop Songs (Billboard)	54
