= Ether (song) =

2001 song by Nas

Song by Nas

from the album Stillmatic
- Released: December 4, 2001
- Recorded: 2001
- Genre: Hip-hop
- Length: 4:37
- Label: Ill Will; Columbia
- Songwriters: Nasir Jones; Rondell Turner
- Producer: Ron Browz

"Ether" is a diss track by American rapper Nas, from his 2001 album Stillmatic. The song was a response to Jay-Z's "Takeover", released earlier that year. "Ether" has been called a "classic" diss track and one of the "wildest" according to Rolling Stone.

== Content ==
Nas has described the song title as a reference to a superstition about ghosts disliking the fumes from ether, explaining that he desired "to affect [Jay-Z] with my weapon and get to his soul" in a similar fashion.

The lyrics of "Ether" primarily insult Jay-Z for a variety of reasons. Throughout the song, Nas questions the veracity of Jay-Z's drug lord persona and argues that he was never involved in crime. Instead, Nas describes Jay-Z as a sycophantic copycat who attempted to latch onto a string of mentors, including Jaz-O, Big Daddy Kane, Irv Gotti, and the Notorious B.I.G. Nas also asserts that Jay-Z is a weaker rapper than his contemporaries, challenging his claims to have surpassed B.I.G. and alleging that Eminem "murdered" Jay-Z on their collaboration "Renegade". The lyrics go on to criticize Jay-Z's appearance, and speculates that his misogynistic lyrics stem from resentment against women who once called him ugly. Jay-Z is also mocked for his appearance in Jaz-O's "Hawaiian Sophie". Elsewhere in the song, Nas questions Jay-Z's originality, accusing him of rehashing B.I.G.'s lyrics and claiming that Jay-Z's album The Blueprint was imitating the title of Boogie Down Productions' 1989 album, Ghetto Music: The Blueprint of Hip Hop. Several lines in the song also feature homophobic insults: Nas refers to Jay-Z as "Gay-Z", and describes him as "a dick-riding faggot" with "dick-sucking lips".

Nas references Jay-Z's lyrics at several points in "Ether". The song's chorus is built around the phrase "I will not lose", an allusion to Jay-Z's song "U Don't Know". Nas also riffs on the chorus of "Takeover", rapping "R-O-C, get gunned up and clapped quick" in the same cadence as the "Takeover" line "R-O-C, we running this rap shit". The introduction to the song features a distorted sample of Tupac Shakur saying "Fuck Jay-Z".

The backing track of "Ether", produced by a then relatively unknown Ron Browz, found its way to Nas after Browz's manager, who worked at the Def Jam Recordings offices, bumped into Nas' travel agent and pleaded with her to give the production to Nas. Browz was unaware of how his production would be used until Nas invited him to the studio to play him the completed song for the first time. Browz had previously offered the production to Kyambo "Hip-Hop" Joshua, Jay-Z's A&R manager at the time, who turned it down.

In a 2012 interview with hip-hop website ThisIs50, fellow rapper Large Professor claimed that an earlier version of "Ether" was produced by Swizz Beatz and featured even more offensive lyrics, including a line where Nas allegedly raps "It should've been you in that plane crash", a reference to the 2001 plane crash that caused the death of American singer Aaliyah, which occurred during the early stages of the Jay-Z–Nas feud. Large Professor expanded on this in a further interview with DJ Vlad in 2019, stating that the full lyric reads "Sorry Aaliyah / I'm sorry it was you in the plane crash / It should've been Jay..."

== Release and aftermath ==
"Ether" was released in 2001 on December 4, Jay-Z's 32nd birthday. On this day, Jay-Z and Dame Dash visited a New York City club where the DJ started to play the song. Both men told the DJ not to do so, but he refused the request and played it anyway. Fellow rapper Ras Kass, also present in the club that night, cited this – along with the rapturous response of the club attendees once the song was eventually played – as a major turning point in the feud and a sign that Nas would emerge victorious: "...the club was going up, and that's when I knew it was over. The DJ was like, 'Fuck that,' and played that shit. And the club went up. That's when I knew Nas won. The streets had spoken. The DJ played it and Jay was in the building [...] Nas beat Jay."

Jay-Z responded to "Ether" with two tracks; in the first "Don't You Know", he states that Nas "bit" 2Pac's style among other things. Nas responded by saying, "After I put out Ether, Jay made two records. [Don't You Know] was so garbage that it played for one night [on Funk Flex's show], and [Hot 97] never played again and nobody ever talked about it. He called [himself "Euro Jay"] in the beginning of the record". In the second, "Supa Ugly", Jay-Z states that he slept with the mother of Nas' child. After a phone call from his mother, Jay-Z admitted that he went too far with this insult and apologized. "Supa Ugly" marked the "official" end of the battle, although references to the beef can be found on Nas' "Last Real Nigga Alive" from God's Son, "U Wanna Be Me" from 8 Mile and "Everybody's Crazy" from The Lost Tapes, and Jay-Z's "Blueprint 2" from The Blueprint 2: The Gift and The Curse album. The last subliminal shots thrown at each other was on the Bravehearts' single "Quick To Back Down" featuring Nas & Lil Jon, in which Nas claims that he's better than Jay-Z. In response to this, Jay-Z released the "Public Service Announcement 2" in which he takes shots at Nas.

The Jay-Z vs. Nas feud was beneficial to both of their respected careers. Stillmatic and its standout track "Ether" marked Nas' return to popularity two years after having released his critically panned album Nastradamus. Many fans still credit Ether as the revival of Nas' career; while he has not matched the commercial success of It Was Written or I Am..., his work since Stillmatic has been received better critically. The battle also boosted Jay-Z's career, giving him notoriety for having the bravado to attack a respected rapper such as Nas. The feud (or "beef") between the two rappers has since been reconciled, and they have gone on to collaborate on the song "Black Republican", from Nas' 2006 album Hip Hop Is Dead, "Success", from Jay-Z's 2007 album American Gangster, "I Do It For Hip Hop" from Ludacris' 2008 album Theater of the Mind, "BBC" from Jay-Z's 2013 album Magna Carta Holy Grail as well as the unreleased song "The Scientist" produced by Just Blaze and this song was rumored to be a song that did not make Nas' Untitled album.

On Nas' 2022 album King's Disease III, he playfully references the feud, rapping "No beef with rivals, they playing 'Ether' on Tidal" on the track "Thun".

== Legacy ==
When [Funkmaster] Flex played it, I ain't going to lie, I admitted to myself and had to tell the big homey he got us, he got one up on us. That shit was cooked crack cocaine right there. Like it was no denying that record was hot as fuck, it was a bunch of lies on that record, but it was still a hot record. One that is going down in history, you know what I mean.

— Memphis Bleek, recounting the reaction felt to Ether 2007

"Ether" has been cited as a "classic" diss track and the "wildest" in hip hop history by music publications. When asked to name his favorite rap battle, Papoose pointed to the feud between Jay-Z and Nas, citing the release Ether as one of the decisive moments of the affair: "That's one of the great battles, there's other ones too though, in hip-hop history. I can go on and on, but that's one that stands out...It wasn't an age thing but a lot of people were sleeping. Like, 'It's over! Jay-Z killed him!' I was like, 'Aight, watch.' I knew it was coming, man." (Hot 93.7) Similarly, Jadakiss claims that "...'Ether' sits on the mantle when it comes to battle songs. From the production, to the way he formatted it, to what he was saying – he touched everything. It was an A-Plus grade." In contrast, Kendrick Lamar considers "Takeover" to be the superior diss song of the two, arguing that whilst "Ether" was "powerful", he preferred "Takeover" because "...[Jay-Z] was saying more facts" and suggests that many only supported Nas as the perceived underdog of the feud at the time.

Due to the popularity of "Ether", Ron Browz went on to nickname himself Ether Boy.

Shortly after Nas released the song, the word "ether" entered the hip hop lexicon as a slang expression, meaning to ruthlessly humiliate an opponent. "To 'ether' someone," writes Son Raw, "means to completely dismantle them in a rap battle with no regard for petty concerns such as 'logic' or 'cleverness' – it's a giant shock-n-awe display of machismo meant to scar the victim for life and leave an unmistakable blemish on his career." In addition, the song itself helped to popularize the term "stan" as a pejorative term (which originally referenced Eminem's 2000 hit single, denoting an obsessive fan).

Ether has also been referenced and sampled by rappers who have sought to stylize their own diss recordings along similar lines of severity, including The Game, Joe Budden, Saigon, Shyne, and Joey Bada$$ among others. Eminem took the sample of "Ether" and used it in Xzibit's song "My Name", featuring Nate Dogg, which was a diss song to Jermaine Dupri. Jin used the instrumental of the song to diss Rosie O'Donnell. In 2012, Cassidy alluded to the song in his threat against Meek Mill, stating, "If I do a diss record, it's going to be on the 'Ether' level if not worse." Cassidy went on to record a song against Mill titled R.A.I.D. which samples and quotes segments of Ether.

Remy Ma also used the instrumentals for her own diss track titled "Shether" aimed at Nicki Minaj which was released on February 25, 2017.

== Charts ==
Chart performance for "Ether"
Chart (2001)	Peak position
US Hot R&B/Hip-Hop Songs (Billboard)	50

== See also ==
- List of notable diss tracks
