= God's Son (album) =

2002 studio album by Nas

Studio album by Nas
- Released: December 13, 2002
- Recorded: 2001–2002
- Genres: East Coast hip-hop; conscious hip-hop; alternative hip-hop
- Length: 57:06
- Labels: Ill Will; Columbia
- Producers: Nas; Agile; The Alchemist; Alicia Keys; Chucky Thompson; Eminem; Ron Browz; Salaam Remi

Nas chronology
The Lost Tapes (2002)	God's Son (2002)	Street's Disciple (2004)

Singles from God's Son
- 1. "Made You Look" Released: September 10, 2002; 2. "I Can" Released: February 11, 2003; 3. "Get Down" Released: July 8, 2003

God's Son is the sixth studio album by American rapper Nas. It was released on December 13, 2002, by Ill Will and Columbia Records. Production took place during 2001 to 2002, and was handled by several producers, including Salaam Remi, Chucky Thompson, Ron Browz, Eminem, and The Alchemist. The album also includes guest appearances from artists such as Alicia Keys, Kelis, and a posthumous feature from 2Pac. Musically, God's Son blends hardcore hip hop with elements of soul and jazz. Partly inspired by the death of his mother in early 2002, God's Son covers lyrical themes such as religion, violence, grief, redemption and his own emotional experiences. It has been recognized by critics as some of Nas' most personal work.

The album debuted at number 18 on the US Billboard 200, selling 156,000 copies in its first week of sales. It produced three singles that achieved Billboard chart success, and received critical acclaim, with critics praising Nas' lyricism and viewing it as a progression from his previous work. On January 14, 2003, the album was certified platinum by the Recording Industry Association of America (RIAA) for sales surpassing one million copies.

== Background ==
Nas's debut album, Illmatic (1994), received much critical acclaim, but his next few releases were considered to have been more commercial, which received criticism. Fellow New York rapper Jay-Z dissed Nas on "Takeover". Nas responded with "Ether", elevating a heated feud. "Ether" was released on 2001's Stillmatic, an acclaimed album that signaled Nas' return to "hip-hop prominence." Jay-Z later challenged Nas to a pay-per-view rap battle, but Nas rejected, and said: "Pay-per-view is for wrestlers and boxers. I make records. If Jay-Z wants to battle, he should drop his album the same day I do and let the people decide" referring to God's Son and Jay-Z's The Blueprint 2 release.

After the release of Stillmatic, Nas spent time tending to his ill mother, Ann Jones, until she died of breast cancer in April 2002. Nas has described Jay-Z's disses during this time period as "sneak attack[s]" because Nas did not want to record music while his mother was sick. Nas' mother died in his arms, and later served as inspiration for various songs on God's Son. At the time, Nas was nearing the end of his feud with Jay-Z, which also inspired the album's emotional and personal material. During 2002, fans and critics speculated that Nas was still willing to make commercial music as he started associating himself with artists from Murder Inc., a label distributing mainstream hip hop/rap. Irv Gotti claimed that Nas might sign with him, and he said: "I will definitely be affiliated [with Nas] and I'll definitely be a part of [his projects], me and my brother Ja Rule." Nas soon appeared on "The Pledge (Remix)", a song by Ja Rule in which Nas hints at signing with the hip hop label.

By October 2002, God's Son was expected to be released on Tuesday, December 17, 2002, with production from Salaam Remi, Large Professor and The Alchemist, as well as songs recorded with Ja Rule in Miami. Around the same time, a music video for the single "Made You Look" was being shot. In December, Nas appeared in the video for a 2Pac single, "Thugz Mansion (N.Y.)", a song of which an alternative version was later released on God's Son, featuring two verses from Nas and one from 2Pac. On December 4, Nas decided to push up the release date for God's Son to Friday, December 13, 2002, in order to prevent bootlegging. Commenting on this, he said, "God's Son is my most personal album and I poured my heart and spirit into it[.] It's important to me that the fans hear my album the way I intended. When you buy a bootleg or pirate a download off the Net, you don't get the real thing. The sound sucks, the sequencing is wrong, you're probably missing some tracks, and you don't even get the artwork and CD bonuses."

== Composition ==
=== Production ===
God's Son featured production from various producers, including Salaam Remi, Eminem and Alchemist. Remi produced 5 tracks while all other producers work on 2 or less tracks. Music critic Serena Kim of Vibe magazine supports Nas' use of a variety of commercially risky producers saying, "The risks he takes with the production are a big part of the allure of God's Son. In a time when a Neptunes beat is as essential as a savvy marketing plan, Nas goes in the other direction, giving producer Salaam Remi plenty of room." "Get Down" is a funky rework of "The Boss" and "Funky Drummer" by James Brown, while "Last Real Nigga Alive" contains a simplistic beat dominated by eerie keys that seem to be made by a Casio keyboard. Remi samples many genres of music from classical (Beethoven's "Für Elise" in "I Can") to deep funk (Incredible Bongo Band's "Apache" in "Made You Look") while other producers do not rely on samples at all. "Dance", a Chucky Thompson production, contains a simple beat consisting of a bass guitar riff and faint drums, neither of which are sampled. Another track that is notable for its lack of sampling is "Thugz Mansion (N.Y.)." Produced by Claudio Cueni and Michael Herring, it contains a beat consisting solely of an acoustic guitar riff. Brett Berliner of Stylus Magazine described the sound of "Made You Look" as old-school influenced and "trunk-rattling", while he wrote that "Dance", a plea by Nas for one more day with his recently passed mother, features production that "sounds straight out of 1995 and a Hootie and the Blowfish album." Berliner summed up the album's diverse productions, stating:

In some places, like "I Can" and the Eminem track "The Cross", the production is chilling and haunting, but in others, like the generic "radio" track "Hey Nas", it is flat and uninspiring. However, to his credit, Nas tries do something different with many of the remaining tracks. "Get Down", the introduction, is unique because it seems to contain many influences, from funk, Soul and Pop to Jazz and Reggae. "Thugz Mansion (NY)", featuring a posthumous verse from 2Pac, is much stronger than its West Coast version on 2Pac's new album, Better Dayz, strengthened by an acoustic guitar ... Finally, "Heaven" appears to have a drum 'n bass influence that accentuates Nas' odd vision of what heaven is to him.

Although there is no actual musical band or ensemble for God's Son, various musicians play instruments on it; Mercedes Abal plays the flute, Jeff Bass plays the keyboards, Olu Dara plays the horns and Michael Herring plays the guitar.

=== Lyrical themes ===
Although guest appearances are made by Kelis, Alicia Keys, and others, God's Son is considered to be a personal album, in which he covers lyrical themes of his own emotional experiences. The personal lyrics are a result of Nas' mother dying less than a year before the album's release. He dedicates "Dance" to his mom, and references her in "Warrior Song" and "Last Real Nigga Alive." "Dance" is considered to be one of Nas' most introspective tracks, and has been described as "a requiem for Nas' mother" that "is touching rather than mawkish." Nas' lyrics also deal with religion as the album's title conveys. He ponders the concept of heaven on "Heaven", and makes various biblical references to describe himself on "The Cross". Even with similar themes, each track is distinct from the rest providing God's Son with a "narrative sense". One noteworthy concept track is "Book of Rhymes" where Nas raps songs that he had written in his rhyme book years ago. At times, he stops rapping, and starts commenting on how bad some of his lyrics are amongst other things. According to one writer, "The self-examination that inevitably accompanies the death of a loved one has also provoked a renewed sense of socio-political consciousness in Nas."

== Singles ==
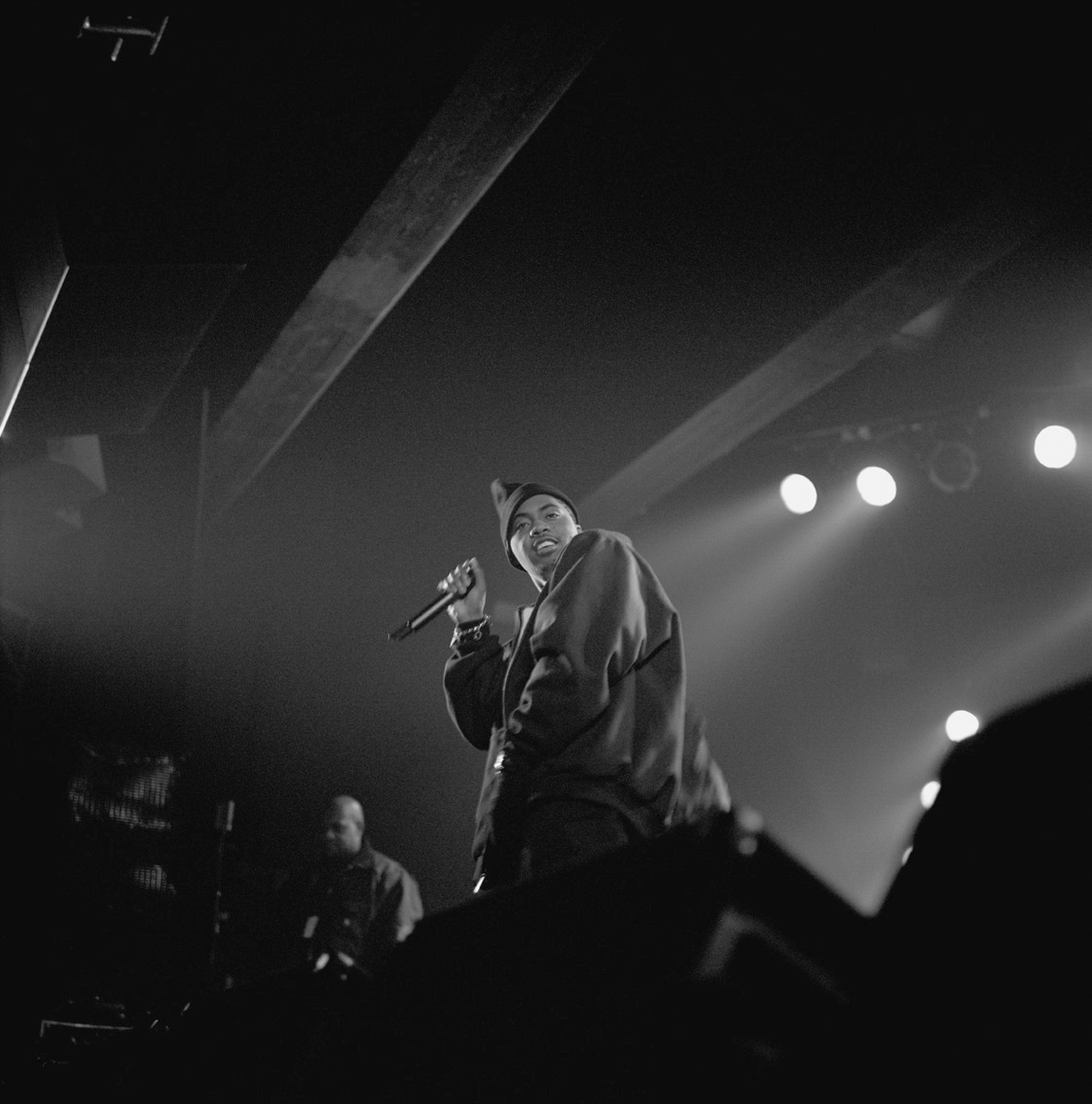
Nas in 2003

"Made You Look" was released as the first single for God's Son on February 12, 2003. It was produced by Salaam Remi and samples "Apache" performed by Incredible Bongo Band. Jason Birchmeier of AllMusic claims that the first single on God's Son "announces Nas' periodic return with fury and bombast" and is a "Marley Marl-fashioned track." Jon Robinson of IGN.com claims that "Made You Look" shows Nas' "lyrical genius." Additionally, Ethan Brown of New York Magazine, says it to be "extraordinarily powerful." It was the second most successful single for God's Son reaching at number 32 on the Billboard Hot 100. It reached at number 16 and number 47 in "Singles of the Year" lists from Blender magazine and Pitchfork, respectively. Q magazine also ranked it as the 903rd best song ever in 2003, and Blender followed suit, ranking it as the 185th best song from the 1980s to the 2000s in 2005.

The second and most successful single, "I Can", was released as early as March 4, 2003, internationally. It boasts production from Salaam Remi, who samples from "Für Elise" by Ludwig van Beethoven and "Impeach the President" by The Honey Drippers for the song's beat. Its lyrics are positive, encouraging the youth to stay drug-free, and pursue their dreams. The lyrics also detail various events in African history, but Christian Hoard of Rolling Stone magazine labels "I Can" as "a silly stay-in-school ad attached to a Beethoven sample." This comment may be attributed to the "singsongy" call and response chorus featuring the voices of young children. Other reviewers appreciated "I Can" more: Jon Robinson of IGN.com claims that on his second single, "Nas delivers some of his most inspiring lyrics to date." "I Can" received significant commercial success, reaching #12 on the Billboard Hot 100 and #7 on the Rhythmic Top 40 charts.

The third and final single, "Get Down" was released in July 2003. Produced by Salaam Remi and Nas, it samples James Brown's "The Boss", the percussion from James Brown's "Funky Drummer" and "Rock Creek Park" by The Blackbyrds. Its lyrics detail 3 loosely described criminal stories from different locations. The first story takes place in New York City, New York, where an alleged criminal steals the gun of a court officer, and starts shooting. The 2nd story deals with cocaine dealers from Tennessee who provide Nas with a laced blunt. The final story takes place in Los Angeles where Nas goes to a violent funeral in Crenshaw with his cousin, and later kills 3 people. The stories are linked together by a speech from Salaam Remi that implies that black people will never "get up" if they "get down" in crime. Christian Hoard of Rolling Stone considers "Get Down" to be the best song on God's Son, as does columnist Serena Kim of Vibe. The single was not a significant commercial success, and it failed to reach the Billboard Hot 100 chart.

== Critical reception ==
Professional ratings
Aggregate scores
Source	Rating
Metacritic	81/100
Review scores
Source	Rating
AllMusic	4/5 stars
Blender	4/5 stars
Entertainment Weekly	B
Los Angeles Times	3.5/4 stars
NME	4/5 stars
Pitchfork	8.6/10
Q	4/5 stars
Rolling Stone	3/5 stars
Spin	6/10
Stylus Magazine	B+

God's Son was released to acclaim from music critics. At Metacritic, which assigns a normalized rating out of 100 to reviews from mainstream critics, the album received an average score of 81, based on 18 reviews. AllMusic and IGN place it below Illmatic and Stillmatic. Despite calling the production "lukewarm", Pitchfork's Sam Chennault lauded Nas' verbal ability, describing him as "technically stunning" as an emcee, as well as "rhythmically versatile and intellectually astute." Chennault also compared God's Son to Nas' debut album, writing that the former has more emotional depth than Illmatic, and stating "In many ways, God's Son is lyrically superior to Illmatic. Nas has created an album that is at once mournful and resilient, street-savvy and academic." Serena Kim of Vibe gave the album a 4 out of 5 disc-rating and stated "He's disarmingly self-deprecating here, and gives us a rare look into his artistic process". Ethan Brown of New York praised Nas' lyricism and found its musically significant, stating:

Here, Nas is so fierce, so plainspoken, so lean with words, that he demolishes not just the oeuvre of our ruling rappers and recalls the music's lyrical champs like Rakim, he even brings to mind hip-hop progenitors like Muhammad Ali in the "Rumble in the Jungle" era ... Like pathbreaking projects past, God's Son is not simply a great album, it's a reminder of what we've been missing ... Nas brings hip-Hop back to the basics with a rough break-beat and a well-told story. This is the essence of punk; let's see if Nas's stripped-down rap starts a revolution.

In a mixed review, Ta-Nehisi Coates of The Village Voice criticized Nas for abandoning his role as "rap's foremost observer" for "the ballad of the learned thug" and stated, "Nas has rendered himself mediocre. At his worst, he becomes a Tupac clone content to contemplate hackneyed hip-hop maxims, like whether there is a heaven for gangsters (see 'Thugz Mansion N.Y.'). A more apt question is whether there is a heaven for a cliché, because several cuts on God's Son are begging for funerals." Spin commented that "Nas' heart is in the right place, but his mind is somewhere else entirely", adding that God's Son follows what "we were really waiting for", The Lost Tapes. Stylus Magazine editor Brett Berliner stated, "Honestly, if Nas had chosen to drop about 4 tracks and cut it down to Illmatic's 10, it would be in the class of Stillmatic, and we’d be talking about it as Nas’ 4th classic." However, Berliner viewed that Nas' performance makes up for the album's flaws, commenting that "Nas stays poignant, clever and intelligent, and, in doing so, adds an extra incentive to purchase his album: simply put, he's the best lyricist in Rap today, maybe all time. Specifically, his consistency is such that he has the ability to save poorly produced songs with his rhymes alone."

In his consumer guide for The Village Voice, Robert Christgau gave the album a three-star honorable mention, indicating "an enjoyable effort consumers attuned to its overriding aesthetic or individual vision may well treasure." Christgau cited "Book of Rhymes" and "Get Down" as highlights and quipped, "confessions of a mama's boy, tales of a hustler, lies of a mortal man". Despite criticizing it for its "boring-ass filler", Christian Hoard of Rolling Stone lauded Nas' "talent" throughout the album, and stated "he may yet have another masterpiece in him. Either way, he's hip-hop's Comeback Playa of the Year." Spin named "Made You Look" the ninth best single of 2003. The Village Voice ranked God's Son number 52 on its Pazz & Jop critics' poll. Kludge included it on their list of best albums of 2002. The website aggregator Metacritic ranked it as the 25th best-reviewed album of 2002. Henry Adaso of About.com cited God's Son in retrospect as the one album where Nas shows "growth and maturity".

== Commercial performance ==
God's Son debuted at #18 on the Billboard 200 chart with first week sales of 156,000 copies, ultimately peaking at number 12. It sold 630,000 copies in its 3 weeks within the Top 20 of the chart. It reached #1 on the Top R&B/Hip-Hop Albums chart and was certified Platinum in sales on January 14, 2003, by the RIAA. Additionally, its three singles performed well on the charts. "I Can" was a Rhythmic Top 40 and Top 40 Mainstream hit that peaked #12 on the Billboard Hot 100. "Made You Look" peaked #32 on the Hot 100 singles chart, while "Get Down" peaked at #76 on the Hot R&B/Hip-Hop Singles & Tracks chart. The success of its singles allowed God's Son to obtain Platinum RIAA status.

== Impact ==
After the releases of "Ether" and Stillmatic, Nas gained renewed respect and acclaim as the best rapper in New York, also known as the "King of New York". God's Son was a chance for Nas to either reassure his prolific status or prove to be an inconsistent artist. In a review of God's Son, Joseph Jones of PopMatters stated:

God's Son is monumental in terms of the current power struggle in hip hop. Whether you like it or not, "Ether" did this. With God's Son, Nas has the opportunity to cement his status as the King of N.Y., at least for another 3-4 year term, or he could prove that he is not the savior that hip-hop fans should be pinning their hopes on.

On God's Son, Nas referenced his feud with Jay-Z on various tracks. Most notably, Nas references Jay-Z's attacks on Nas "Last Real Nigga Alive" as "sneak attack[s]" while he was caring for his mother. This track also revealed roots of his feud with Jay-Z including his feud with The Notorious B.I.G. In fact, Nas ends the first verse of "Last Real Nigga Alive" by saying, "There's more shit than wanting to be this King of New York shit." Similarly, on "Mastermind", Nas says: "This King Of New York shit only last 15 minutes." Additionally, on "The Cross", Nas explained how he was the old king of New York Rap, and soon reinvented himself to reign again as New York's king. Amy Linden of Yahoo! Music found it to be an album "worthy of [Nas'] landmark 1994 debut" Illmatic and elaborated on God's Son's significance at the time, stating "If this is the last round with Jay, as the surprisingly civil tone and anti-battle messages imply, then God's Son is going out on top."

== Track listing ==
Credits adapted from the album's liner notes.

No.	Title	Writer(s)	Producer(s)	Length
1.	"Get Down"	Nasir Jones; Salaam Gibbs	Nas; Salaam Remi	4:04
2.	"The Cross"	N. Jones; Marshall Mathers; Jeff Bass	Eminem	3:49
3.	"Made You Look"	N. Jones; Gibbs; Jeremiah Lordan	Salaam Remi	3:21
4.	"Last Real Nigga Alive"	N. Jones; Rondell Turner	Ron Browz	5:05
5.	"Zone Out" (featuring Bravehearts)	N. Jones; Gibbs; Jabari Jones; Michael Epps	Salaam Remi	3:48
6.	"Hey Nas" (featuring Kelis and Claudette Ortiz)	N. Jones; Gibbs; Keni Burke; Allan Felder; Norma Jean Wright	Salaam Remi	4:05
7.	"I Can"	N. Jones; Gibbs; Roy Hammond	Salaam Remi	4:13
8.	"Book of Rhymes"	N. Jones; Alan Maman; David Camon	The Alchemist	3:54
9.	"Thugz Mansion (N.Y.)" (featuring 2Pac and J. Phoenix)	Tupac Shakur; Johnny Jackson; Claudio Cueni; Michael Herring; N. Jones; Larry Loftin	Claudio Cueni; Michael Herring	4:07
10.	"Mastermind"	N. Jones; Maman	The Alchemist	4:07
11.	"Warrior Song" (featuring Alicia Keys)	N. Jones; Alicia Keys	Alicia Keys	4:42
12.	"Revolutionary Warfare" (featuring Lake)	N. Jones; Maman; Patrick Adams; Terry Phillips; Leroy Jackson	The Alchemist	3:29
13.	"Dance"	N. Jones; Chucky Thompson	Chucky Thompson for The Hitmen	3:34
14.	"Heaven" (featuring Jully Black and Saukrates)	N. Jones; Eddie Holman; Sheila Holman; Ajene Griffith; Karl Wailoo; Jully Black	Agile; Saukrates (co)	4:41
Total length:				56:58

Bonus disc
No.	Title	Producer(s)	Length
15.	"Thugz Mirror Freestyle"	The Alchemist	1:50
16.	"Pussy Killz"	Chucky Thompson for The Hitmen	4:38
17.	"The G.O.D."	Swizz Beatz	2:39
Total length:			9:07

=== Sample credits ===
"Get Down"

- "The Boss" by James Brown
- "Funky Drummer" by James Brown
- "Rock Creek Park" by The Blackbyrds

"Made You Look"

- "Apache" by Incredible Bongo Band

"Hey Nas"

- "Risin' to the Top" by Keni Burke

"I Can"

- "Für Elise" by Ludwig van Beethoven
- "Impeach the President" by The Honey Drippers

"Book of Rhymes"

- "For the Dollar Bill" by Tommy Tate

"Warrior Song"

- "Na Poi" by Fela Kuti

"Revolutionary Warfare"

- "We Made It" by Black Ivory

"Dance"

- "Aïcha" by Cheb Khaled
- "I Hope You Dance" by Lee Ann Womack

"Heaven"

- "I Love You" by Eddie Holman

"Pussy Killz"

- "My Hero Is a Gun" by Diana Ross

== Personnel ==
=== Musicians ===
- Nas – vocals, executive producer; co-producer (track 1)
- Bravehearts – vocals (track 5)
- Claudette Ortiz – vocals (track 6)
- Kelis – vocals (track 6)
- J. Phoenix – vocals (track 9)
- 2Pac – vocals (track 9)
- Alicia Keys – vocals, producer (track 11)
- Lake – vocals (track 12)
- Jully Black – vocals (track 14)

=== Production ===
- The Alchemist – producer (tracks: 8, 10, 12, 15)
- Eminem – producer (track 2)
- Ron Browz – producer (track 4)
- Claudio Cueni – co-producer (track 9)
- Michael Herring – producer (track 9)
- Chucky Thompson – producer (track 13)
- Agile – co-producer (track 14)
- Saukrates – producer (track co-produced 14)
- Chris Gehringer – mastering engineer
- Steve Stoute – executive producer
- David Belgrave – marketing
- Chris a.k.a. "Brother Feldmann" – art direction, design
- James Hunter – graphic artist
- Jarrett Demartino – illustration
- Jonathan Mannion – photography

== Charts ==
=== Weekly charts ===
Chart performance for God's Son
Chart (2002–2003)	Peak position
Australian Albums (ARIA)	57
Canadian Albums (Nielsen SoundScan)	41
Canadian R&B Albums (Nielsen SoundScan)	12
Dutch Albums (Album Top 100)	42
French Albums (SNEP)	46
German Albums (Offizielle Top 100)	89
Japanese Albums (Oricon)	97
Swiss Albums (Schweizer Hitparade)	56
UK Albums (Official Charts)	57
US Billboard 200	12
US Top R&B/Hip-Hop Albums (Billboard)	1

=== Year-end charts ===
2002 year-end chart performance for God's Son
Chart (2002)	Position
Canadian R&B Albums (Nielsen SoundScan)	72
Canadian Rap Albums (Nielsen SoundScan)	35

2003 year-end chart performance for God's Son
Chart (2003)	Position
US Billboard 200	58
US Top R&B/Hip-Hop Albums (Billboard)	10

== Certifications ==
Certifications and sales for God's Son
Region	Certification	Certified units/sales
Canada (Music Canada)	Gold	50,000^{^}
United Kingdom (BPI)	Gold	100,000^{*}
United States (RIAA)	Platinum	1,000,000^{^}
^{*} Sales figures based on certification alone.^{^} Shipments figures based on certification alone.

== See also ==
- God's Stepson
