= Get Down (Nas song) =

2003 single by Nas

Single by Nas

from the album God's Son
- Released: July 8, 2003
- Genre: Hip hop
- Length: 4:04
- Label: Ill Will, Columbia
- Songwriters: Nasir Jones; Salaam Gibbs; James Brown; Fred Wesley; Charles A. Bobbit
- Producers: Nas, Salaam Remi

Nas singles chronology
"I Can" (2003)	"Get Down" (2003)	"Thief's Theme" (2004)

"Get Down" is the third and final single released from Nas' 2002 album God's Son. It features descriptive storytelling by written and performed by Nas, who also produced the record with frequent collaborator Salaam Remi. In addition to elements of "Funky Drummer" by James Brown, the track also samples "The Boss" by Brown, which was previously used by the West Coast rapper Ice-T on his 1990 single "You Played Yourself"; the same sample was used in Poor Righteous Teachers' song "Word from the Wise" and Lord Finesse's "Bad Mutha". It was not as popular as Nas' previous two singles from God's Son, but still reached #76 on the Hot R&B/Hip-Hop Singles & Tracks chart.

== Track listing ==
=== A-side ===
1. "Get Down" (Clean Version) (4:04)
2. "Get Down" (Instrumental) (4:04)
3. "Get Down" (Acappella) (3:50)

=== B-side ===
1. "Get Down" (Explicit Version) (4:04)
2. "Last Real Nigga Alive" (Clean) (5:04)
3. "Last Real Nigga Alive" (Explicit Version) (5:04)

== Charts ==
Chart (2003)	Peak position
US Billboard Hot R&B/Hip-Hop Songs	76

== Certifications ==
Region	Certification	Certified units/sales
New Zealand (RMNZ)	Gold	15,000^{‡}
United Kingdom (BPI)	Silver	200,000^{‡}
^{‡} Sales+streaming figures based on certification alone.
