= Magic 2 =

Studio album by Nas
- Released: July 21, 2023
- Recorded: 2022–2023
- Genre: Hip-hop; trap
- Length: 31:54
- Label: Mass Appeal
- Producer: Hit-Boy; Rogét Chahayed

Nas chronology
King's Disease III (2022)	Magic 2 (2023)	Magic 3 (2023)

Singles from Magic 2
- 1. "One Mic, One Gun" Released: November 29, 2022

Magic 2 is the sixteenth studio album by American rapper Nas. It was released on July 21, 2023, through Mass Appeal Records. The album serves as a sequel to Nas' 2021 album Magic, and is the fifth consecutive Nas album produced by Hit-Boy, following the King's Disease trilogy, as well as the first Magic album. The album contains guest appearances from 50 Cent and 21 Savage.

== Background ==
On July 18, 2023, after almost a week of teasing via his Instagram, Nas announced the album, revealing the title and artwork. 50 Cent also took to Instagram to reveal that he will feature on a track titled "Office Hours".

== Critical reception ==
Professional ratings
Aggregate scores
Source	Rating
Metacritic	71/100
Review scores
Source	Rating
AllMusic	4/5 stars
HotNewHipHop	(favourable)
Clash	8/10
HipHopDX	3.8/5
Mic Cheque	6/10
musicOMH	3.5/5 stars
Pitchfork	6.5/10

Magic 2 was met with mostly positive praise from critics upon its release. At Metacritic, which assigns a normalized rating out of 100 to reviews from professional publications, the album has received an average score of 71 based on seven reviews, indicating "generally favorable reviews".

Clash's Robin Murray called the album "a bravura feast of word play combined to some of the most effective beats of his career" and found that Nas "tak[es] the energy of his 90s recordings into a fresh era". Dylan Green of Pitchfork described Magic 2 as "a low-stakes mid-career rap album to show that one of the genre's icons is still in decent fighting shape", writing that some of Nas's lines feel "forced, like he's cycling through Urban Dictionary tabs open on a laptop in the booth". Reviewing the album for AllMusic, Paul Simpson concluded that, " While not all of Magic 2 is this strong, there are several moments like this one ["One Mic, One Gun"] that can contend with the best of the King's Disease material."

== Track listing ==
All tracks written by Nasir Jones and Chauncey Hollis (Hit-Boy) and produced by Hollis.

Magic 2 track listing
No.	Title	Writer(s)	Length
1.	"Intro"		0:39
2.	"Abracadabra"		2:46
3.	"Office Hours" (featuring 50 Cent)	Jones; Hollis; Curtis Jackson	3:52
4.	"Black Magic"		2:36
5.	"Motion"		2:52
6.	"Bokeem Woodbine"		3:00
7.	"Earvin Magic Johnson"		3:27
8.	"What This All Really Means"		3:00
9.	"Slow It Down"		3:30
10.	"Pistols on Your Album Cover"		3:23
11.	"One Mic, One Gun" (with 21 Savage; bonus track)	Jones; Hollis; She'yaa bin Abraham Joseph; Marilyn Turbinton	2:49
Total length:			31:54

Sample credits

- "Intro" samples "Hello, Dolly!" by Jean-Jacques Perrey and "I Personify What Hip-Hop Talks About" by Don "Magic" Juan.
- "Abracadabra" contains part of a 2018 Radio Rahim interview with Deontay Wilder.
- "Office Hours" samples "I Can Sing a Rainbow/Love Is Blue" by The Dells.
- "Black Magic" samples "Black Magic" by Graveyard Production.
- "Motion" samples "Bumpin' Bus Stop" by Thunder and Lightning and "Ya Abo Elkolub" by Ehab Tawfik.
- "Bokeem Woodbine" samples "Drum Pan Sound" by Reggie Stepper and "Three Faces" by Menahan Street Band.
- "Earvin Magic Johnson" samples "Don't Make the Good Girls Go Bad" by Della Humphrey.
- "Slow It Down" samples "Don't Mess With Mister 'T'" by Marvin Gaye and dialogue from American Pimp.
- "Pistols on Your Album Cover" samples "Hip Hop vs. Rap" by KRS-One.

== Charts ==
Chart performance for Magic 2
Chart (2023)	Peak position
UK Album Downloads (OCC)	13
UK Independent Albums (OCC)	47
UK R&B Albums (OCC)	14
US Billboard 200	52
US Top R&B/Hip-Hop Albums (Billboard)	18
