= Takeover (Jay-Z song) =

Song by Jay-Z

from the album The Blueprint
- Released: September 11, 2001
- Recorded: July 2001
- Genre: Hip hop; hardcore hip-hop; rap rock; gangsta rap
- Length: 5:13
- Label: Roc-A-Fella; Def Jam
- Songwriters: Shawn Carter; Kanye West
- Producer: Kanye West

"Takeover" is a track recorded by Jay-Z for his 2001 album The Blueprint. The song is a diss track aimed at rappers Nas and Prodigy of Mobb Deep.

== Background ==
This song was the first official LP diss track to publicize directly the hip hop feud between Jay-Z and Nas (although there exist several other rap records prior to this featuring disses from both Nas and Jay-Z toward each other).

== Composition ==
"Takeover" was produced by Kanye West and samples The Doors' "Five to One" as well as "Sound of da Police" by KRS-One. The first line in this song is taken from Jay-Z's verse in "Celebration" off of the Streets Is Watching soundtrack. The song also interpolates David Bowie's "Fame". The line "Get zipped up in plastic, when it happens, that's it" is borrowed from "The Watcher" by Dr. Dre.

Jay-Z originally performed the first two verses of "Takeover" as an untitled diss to Prodigy of Mobb Deep at Hot 97's Summer Jam 2001. While performing the line "you was a ballerina/ I got the pictures I seen ya" a photograph of Prodigy, as a child, dressed as Michael Jackson, appeared on the large screen. He also mocks Prodigy's small stature. Jay-Z further dismisses Mobb Deep as competition in the hip hop industry by pointing out that his career had more commercial success than they ever would, and dissing Mobb Deep's famous song "Shook Ones Pt. II".

The third verse has 32 bars, while the other verses have 16; in it, Jay-Z ridicules Nas' discography (at the time consisting of four albums) and claims Nas has a "one hot album every ten year average." Jay-Z referred to a widespread feeling from many hip hop critics and artists that Nas' subsequent albums after his legendary debut Illmatic were mediocre, and dissed Nas' famous song from Illmatic, "The World Is Yours". Jay-Z previously sampled some of Nas' lines for the chorus of Jay-Z's famous song "Dead Presidents II". In "Takeover", Jay-Z claims he sampled Nas' lines to use them more impressively: "So yeah I sampled your voice, you was usin' it wrong/ You made it a hot line, I made it a hot song". Jay-Z also questions Nas' street credibility and claims Nas has lied or exaggerated about his past in songs, with the lines, "Nigga, you ain't live it you witnessed from your folks' pad/Scribbled in your notepad and created your life/I showed you your first TEC on tour with Large Professor (Me! That's who!)/Then I heard your album 'bout your TEC on your dresser." (This is a reference to the Illmatic song "Represent"). Jay-Z also ridicules Nas' style, flow, and career decisions, saying, "Nigga switch up your flow, your shit is garbage/What you trying to kick knowledge? (Get the fuck outta here)" and "Fell from top ten to not mentioned at all/To your bodyguard's "Oochie Wally" verse better than yours/Matter fact you had the worst flow in the whole fuckin' song..." "Oochie Wally" is a song by The Bravehearts, and features as a sample in "Takeover" when Jay-Z mentions it.

== Legacy ==
"Takeover" escalated one of the biggest and most hyped hip hop rivalries at the time, and was generally well received by fans. Initially, the song's hard-hitting insults had Jay-Z and many hip hop fans believe that the song had ended Nas' career. On the contrary, however, the track merely served to reinvigorate Nas, as he responded to "Takeover" with an unreleased version of "The General" as well as with a diss track of his own, entitled "Ether". Jay-Z responded to "Ether" with "People Talkin", "Don't You Know", and a freestyle entitled "Super Ugly [I Got Myself A Gun]". Jay-Z and Nas would release other subsequent diss tracks and records referencing the feud, including "Blueprint 2" (from Jay-Z's The Blueprint^{2}: The Gift & The Curse) and "Last Real Nigga Alive" (from Nas' God's Son.)

50 Cent swards Mobb Deep in his own diss song "Piggy Bank", by telling his rival Jadakiss "Jada don't fuck with me if you wanna eat, 'cause I'll do your lil' ass like Jay did Mobb Deep." Coincidentally, 50 signed Mobb Deep to his G-Unit Records imprint a mere few months later. On Mos Def's 2004 album The New Danger, the track "The Rape Over" is essentially a revision of "Takeover", with a similar Kanye West backing track using the same Doors sample. Mos Def's rewritten lyrics criticize the hip-hop industry and attribute hip-hop's direction at the time to "old white men", "corporate forces", and substance abuse.

Chicago pop-rock band Fall Out Boy referenced this song in their 2007 album Infinity on High with the song "The Take Over, the Breaks Over" as a direct mention to the rivalry. In 2007 Mistah F.A.B. used the beat from the track on his Royce da 5'9" diss track entitled "C.I.A."

== Accolades ==
"Takeover" appeared at 51 on Pitchfork's The Top 500 Tracks of the 2000s. Ian Cohen writing a summary said:

There have been diss tracks that have been more personal, more vicious, hell, even more effective-- Nas got a bigger career boost out of his response, the simplistic and homophobic "Ether", which inexplicably (well, not really) was declared the winner by internet scorekeepers who would soon use its title as a slang for smiting one's enemies at all costs. But there's never been a better diss song: Kanye West's "Five to One" flip turned Jim Morrison's Dionysus into Hercules while Jay calmly doled out dismissals that were all the more perfect for their brevity and focus-- "a wise man told me don't argue with fools..."; "I sold what your whole album sold in my first week"; "you only get half a bar..." That entire third verse. As is the case with so many other spats in real life, Jay-Z and Nas would eventually bury the hatchet in the name of good business, but listen to "Takeover" if you're ever confused about who's wearing the pants: Regardless of Jigga's recent output, "Takeover" will always beam with the righteousness one can only have when they're clearly playing the upper hand.

== Credits and personnel ==
The credits for "Takeover" are adapted from the liner notes of The Blueprint.

Studio locations

- Mastered at Masterdisk, New York City, New York.
- Mixed and recorded at Baseline Studios, New York City, New York.

Personnel

- Jay-Z – songwriting, vocals
- Kanye West – production, songwriting
- KRS-One – songwriting
- Eric Burdon – songwriting
- Alan Lomax – songwriting
- Bryan Chandler – songwriting
- Rodney Lemay – songwriting
- Jim Morrison – songwriting
- John Densmore – songwriting
- Robert Krieger – songwriting
- Ray Manzarek – songwriting
- Young Guru – recording, mixing
- Kamel Adbo – recording
- Josey Scott – additional vocals
- Tony Dawsey – mastering

Samples

- "Sound of da Police", as performed by KRS-One and written by Lawrence Parker, Eric Burdon, Alan Lomax, Bryan Chandler and Rodney Lemay.
- "Five to One", as performed by The Doors and written by Jim Morrison, John Densmore, Robert Krieger and Ray Manzarek.

== See also ==
- "Ether" (song)
- List of notable diss tracks
