= Thief's Theme =

Single by Nas

from the album Street's Disciple
- Released: June 29, 2004
- Genre: Hip hop
- Length: 2:59
- Label: Columbia; Sony Urban; Ill Will
- Songwriter: Nasir Jones
- Producer: Salaam Remi

Nas singles chronology
"Get Down" (2003)	"Thief's Theme" (2004)	"Bridging the Gap" (2004)

"Thief's Theme" is a single from Nas' double album Street's Disciple, released through Columbia Records, Sony Urban Music, and Nas' Ill Will Records. The single contains vocals from Nas' song "The World Is Yours" from his first album Illmatic:

The song featured an interpolation of the famous riff from Iron Butterfly's "In-A-Gadda-Da-Vida" performed by Incredible Bongo Band. Nas would again use the same sample on the 2006 single "Hip Hop is Dead".

Nas sponsored a contest in the United Kingdom in 2004, encouraging entrants to record a verse using the instrumental version of the song. The winner would perform a verse on the song, which appears on the UK version of Street's Disciple. Rising Son won the competition.

The song was featured in Martin Scorsese's Academy Award-winning film The Departed but was not featured on the soundtrack.

== Track listing ==
=== A-side ===
1. "Thief's Theme" (Clean Album Version) (3:00)
2. "Thief's Theme" (Explicit Album Version) (3:10)
3. "Thief's Theme" (Instrumental) (2:59)

=== B-side ===
1. "You Know My Style" (Clean Album Version) (2:54)
2. "You Know My Style" (Explicit Album Version) (2:54)
3. "You Know My Style" (Instrumental) (2:49)

== Charts ==
Chart (2004)	Peak position
US Bubbling Under Hot 100 (Billboard)	19
US Hot R&B/Hip-Hop Songs (Billboard)	60
