= From Illmatic to Stillmatic: The Remixes =

EP by Nas
- Released: July 2, 2002
- Genre: Hip hop
- Length: 24:53
- Label: Ill Will; Columbia
- Producer: Large Professor; Dave Atkinson; Poke; Ty Fyffe

Nas chronology
Stillmatic (2001)	From Illmatic to Stillmatic: The Remixes (2002)	The Lost Tapes (2002)

Professional ratings
Review scores
Source	Rating
AllMusic	2.5/5 stars
HipHopDX	4.0/5
RapReviews	6/10

From Illmatic to Stillmatic: The Remixes is an extended play by Nas. It includes six remixed versions of songs from the earlier Nas LPs Illmatic, It Was Written, and Stillmatic. It was released by Columbia Records on July 2, 2002. It features AZ, R. Kelly and Foxy Brown.

== Track listing ==
From Illmatic to Stillmatic: The Remixes track listing
#	Title	Songwriters	Producer(s)	Performer(s)
1	"Life's a Bitch" (Arsenal Mix)	N. Jones, A. Cruz, O. Dara, O. Scott, R. Wilson	Def Jef, Meach Wells	AZ, Nas
2	"One Love" (LG Main Mix)	N. Jones, J. Davis, J. Heath	The LG Experience	Nas
3	"It Ain't Hard to Tell" (Remix)	N. Jones, W.P. Mitchell, L. Crizoe	Large Professor	Nas
4	"Street Dreams" (Remix)	N. Jones, S. Barnes, J. Olivier, A. Lennox, D. Stewart	Poke and Tone	Nas, R. Kelly
5	"Affirmative Action" (Remix Edited Version)	N. Jones, I. Marchand, A. Cruz, D. Atkinson, C. McKay, S. Barnes, J.C. Olivier, M. Williams, C. Curry, D. Clear, Wilson	Dave Atkinson	AZ, Foxy Brown, Nas
6	"One Mic" (Remix)	N. Jones, T. Fyffe, J. Mtume	Ty Fyffe	Nas

Notes

1. From "Life's a Bitch" B-side (1994)
2. From "One Love" B-side (1994)
3. From "It Ain't Hard to Tell" B-side (1994)
4. From "Street Dreams" (Remix) single (1996)
5. From "Street Dreams" B-side (1996)
6. Original track

== Charts ==
Chart performance for From Illmatic to Stillmatic: The Remixes
Chart (2002)	Peak position
US Billboard 200	123
US Top R&B/Hip-Hop Albums (Billboard)	32
