= Steve Stoute =

American businessman (born 1970)

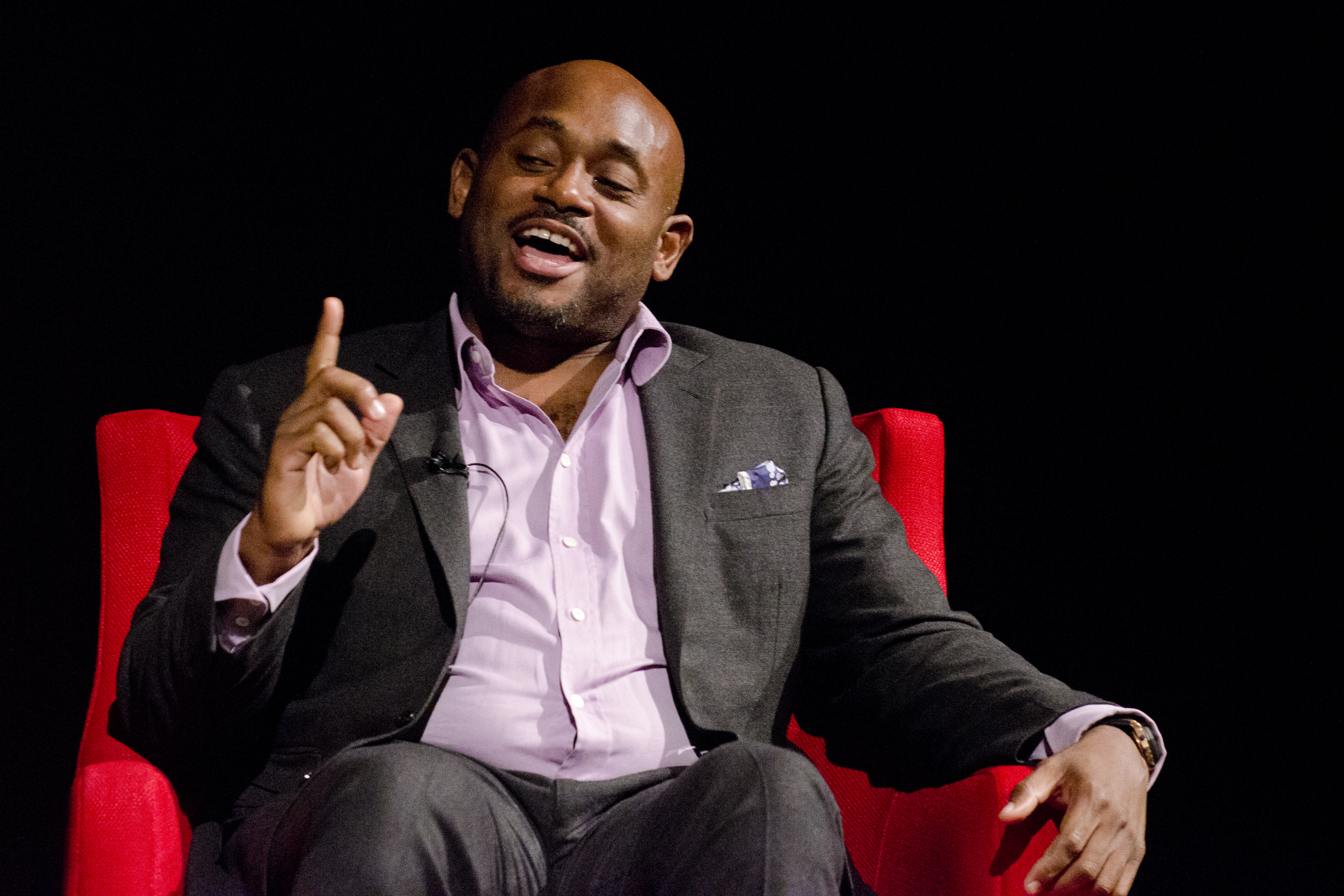
- Stoute in 2014
- Born: June 26, 1970 (age 56); New York City, U.S.
- Other name: The Commissioner
- Occupations: Record executive; businessman; author
- Website: translationllc.com

Steve Stoute (born June 26, 1970) is an American record executive who co-founded Ill Will Records alongside Nas in 1999. He also served as the Executive Vice President of Interscope Geffen A&M Records and President of Urban Music at Sony Music from 1999 to 2009. In 2017, he founded the music distribution platform UnitedMasters, for which he is chief executive officer (CEO). He also founded Translation, a music marketing agency, in 2004.

With singer Mary J. Blige, he co-founded the non-profit, Foundation for the Advancement of Women Now (FFAWN) in 2008. In 2011, he released a book, The Tanning of America: How Hip-Hop Created a Culture That Rewrote the Rules of the New Economy.

== Career ==
=== Music ===
From 1990 to 1999, Stoute was an executive at several labels in the music industry. At Interscope Geffen A&M Records, Stoute was President of the Urban Music division and executive vice president. Prior to joining Interscope, Stoute was president of Urban Music for Sony Music Entertainment, where he played a role in launching the music career of Will Smith. Stoute is the former manager of Nas, Trackmasters and Mary J. Blige.

In April 1999, rapper Sean Combs assaulted Stoute in his office with a champagne bottle over Combs' demand to not air a Nas video he appeared in. In June 1999, Stoute sued, resulting in a $500,000 out-of-court settlement from Combs.

=== Advertising ===
In 2003, Stoute was part of an unsuccessful pitch to convince LeBron James to sign a $10 million contract with Reebok. That same year, Stoute recruited rapper Pusha T to write I'm Lovin' It (song) for McDonald's.

In 2009, Stoute was inducted into the American Advertising Federation's Advertising Hall of Achievement, an award for outstanding advertising professionals age 40 and under. In 2010, Stoute was recognized as "Innovator of the Year" by the ADCOLOR Industry Coalition, an initiative to promote increased diversity in the advertising, marketing, and media industries. In 2013, Stoute was named "Executive of the Year" by Ad Age, a leading publication for the advertising and marketing industries.

=== Management ===
In 2005, Stoute became the managing director and CEO of Carol's Daughter, a multi-cultural beauty brand. He brought together a board of investors including Jada Pinkett Smith, Will Smith, Jay-Z, Mary J. Blige, Jimmy Iovine, Tommy Mottola, and Thalía. Spokeswomen for the line have included Mary J. Blige, Solange Knowles, Cassie Ventura, Selita Ebanks, Kim Fields, and Jada Pinkett Smith. The company grew and sought partnerships with Disney's The Princess and the Frog via a collection of hair and body products for children and with HSN via an exclusive fragrance launch with Mary J. Blige. He has appeared in the HBO series The Black List Project that features interviews and portraits with leading African American figures on being Black in America.

=== Books ===
Stoute released his first book, The Tanning of America: How Hip-Hop Created a Culture That Rewrote the Rules of the New Economy, in 2011 through Gotham Books. In the book, Stoute draws from his background in the music industry and brand marketing to chronicle how hip-hop came to define urban culture as the new embodiment of cool.

In February 2014, the book was made into a four-part VH1 documentary, "The Tanning of America: One Nation Under Hip-Hop." In April 2014, the book was released as an audiobook narrated by Kerry Washington.

Stoute has been a keynote or featured speaker at many events including the International Consumer Electronics Show, the Sundance Film Festival, South by Southwest (SXSW), Fast Company Innovation Uncensored, and AAF's ADMERICA. He appeared on the main stage at the Cannes Lions International Festival of Creativity with Sean Combs in 2013, and again with Kanye West and Venture Capitalist Ben Horowitz in 2014.
