= I Can (Nas song) =

Single by Nas

from the album God's Son
- Released: February 11, 2003
- Recorded: 2002
- Genre: East Coast hip-hop; conscious hip-hop
- Length: 4:13
- Label: Ill Will; Columbia
- Songwriters: Nasir Jones; Salaam Remi; Ludwig van Beethoven; Roy Charles Hammond
- Producer: Salaam Remi

Nas singles chronology
"Thugz Mansion" (2002)	"I Can" (2003)	"Get Down" (2003)

Music video
- "I Can" on YouTube

"I Can" is a single by American rapper Nas from his sixth album, God's Son. It was released internationally February 11, 2003. The song peaked at #12 on the Billboard Hot 100.

== Composition ==
Boasting production from Salaam Remi, the song "I Can" samples Ludwig van Beethoven's "Für Elise" and the drum break from the Honey Drippers' "Impeach the President".

The lyrics are positive, encouraging children to abstain from drugs and pursue their dreams, pointing to examples of powerful icons in the African-American community such as Oprah Winfrey. Conversely, Nas raps about a friend who was moving up in the music scene, only to fall victim to a debilitating drug addiction that took her career and her looks.

== Music video ==
The music video, directed by Chris Robinson, was shot in Los Angeles, and contains footage of Nas rapping while children stand around him. The video starts out with the music from the introduction of "Get Down," but it soon transitions into "I Can." As the video starts, a young girl plays Beethoven on a piano in a vacant lot. Later in the video, children are jumping on a mattress in the same lot. The video also contains footage of break dancing and famous Egyptian structures.

== Reception ==
The single received positive reviews. Christian Hoard of Rolling Stone magazine labels "I Can" as "a silly stay-in-school ad attached to a Beethoven sample." This comment may be attributed to the "singsongy" call and response chorus featuring the voices of young children. Other reviewers appreciated "I Can" more: Jon Robinson of IGN.com claims that on his second single, "Nas delivers some of his most inspiring lyrics to date."

"I Can" charted in 2003 at #12 in Billboard Hot 100, #7 on the Hot R&B/Hip-Hop Singles & Tracks, #6 on the Hot Rap Tracks and #58 on the Billboard Year-End Hot 100 singles of 2003. This is Nas's highest charting single as a lead artist to date.

== Media usage ==
In 2019, the song was used by French life insurance company AXA which dedicates to all people who want to be when they can pursue their dreams. Tennis player Serena Williams is featured in this advert.

== Track listing ==
1. "I Can" (Clean Version) (4:13)
2. "I Can" (Instrumental) (4:14)
3. "I Can" (Acappella) (4:03)

== Charts ==
=== Weekly charts ===
Chart (2003)	Peak position
Australia (ARIA)	43
Australian Urban (ARIA)	11
Canada (Nielsen SoundScan)	39
Denmark (Tracklisten)	15
France (SNEP)	72
Germany (GfK)	53
Ireland (IRMA)	41
Netherlands (Dutch Top 40 Tipparade)	2
Netherlands (Single Top 100)	46
Scottish Singles Sales (Official Charts)	28
Switzerland (Schweizer Hitparade)	43
UK Hip Hop/R&B (Official Charts)	6
UK Singles (Official Charts)	19
US Billboard Hot 100	12
US Hot R&B/Hip-Hop Songs (Billboard)	8
US R&B/Hip-Hop Airplay (Billboard)	6
US Hot Rap Songs (Billboard)	6
US Pop Airplay (Billboard)	27
US Rhythmic Airplay (Billboard)	7

=== Year-end charts ===
Chart (2003)	Position
US Billboard Hot 100	58

== Certifications ==
Region	Certification	Certified units/sales
United States (RIAA)	Gold	500,000^{‡}
^{‡} Sales+streaming figures based on certification alone.
