= Ill Will Records =

American vanity record label

- Parent company: Sony Music; Universal Music Group
- Founded: 1999
- Founder: Nas, Steve Stoute
- Status: Inactive
- Distributors: Columbia; Def Jam
- Genre: Hip hop
- Country of origin: United States
- Location: New York City, New York, United States of America

Ill Will Records is an American vanity record label founded by Nasir "Nas" Jones and Steve Stoute. The label was named after Willie "Ill Will" Graham, Nas' childhood neighbor and best friend, who was shot dead on May 23, 1992, when both were teenagers. Nas co-founded the label in 1999 before the release of his fourth album, Nastradamus, with the help of his then-manager, Steve Stoute.

After signing to Def Jam in 2005, Nas relaunched the label under the name The Jones Experience, as an imprint of Def Jam Recordings. In 2014, Nas co-founded Mass Appeal Records with Peter Bittenbender of the company Decon. The label is the music division of the Mass Appeal Media Group with distribution handled by The Orchard.

== Former artists ==
- Nas
- Bravehearts
- Nature
- Dirty Mouf
- Tre Williams
- Nashawn

== Former producers ==
- Trackmasters
- L.E.S.
- Salaam Remi
- Arkatech Beatz

== Discography ==
| Year | Information |
|---|---|
| 1999 | Nas - Nastradamus: Released: November 23, 1999; Chart positions: #7 U.S Billboard 200; RIAA Certification: Platinum; U.S. sales: 1,262,000+; Singles: "Nastradamus", "You Owe Me" |
| 2000 | Nas and Various Other Artists - Nas & Ill Will Records Presents QB's Finest: Released: November 21, 2000; Chart positions: #53 U.S Billboard 200; RIAA Certification: U.S. sales: Singles: "Da Bridge 2001", "Oochie Wally" |
| 2001 | Nas - Stillmatic: Released: December 18, 2001; Chart positions: #5 U.S Billboard 200; RIAA Certification: Platinum; U.S. sales: 2,179,000+; Singles: "Rule", "Got Ur Self A...", "One Mic |
| 2002 | Nas - From Illmatic to Stillmatic: The Remixes: Released: July 2, 2002; Chart positions: #123 U.S Billboard 200 |
| 2002 | Nas - The Lost Tapes: Released: September 24, 2002; U.S. sales: 361,000; Chart positions: #10 U.S Billboard 200 |
| 2002 | Nas - God's Son: Released: December 13, 2002; Chart positions: #7 U.S Billboard 200; RIAA Certification: Platinum; U.S. sales: 1,362,000+; Singles: "I Can", "Made You Look", "Get Down |
| 2003 | Bravehearts - Bravehearted: Released: December 23, 2003; Chart positions: #75 U.S Billboard 200; RIAA Certification: U.S. sales: Singles: "Quick to Back Down", "B Train", "Bravehearted", "I Wanna", "Buss My Gun", "Cash Flow", "Sensations", "I Will", "Situations" |
| 2004 | Nas - Street's Disciple: Released: November 30, 2004; Chart positions: #5 U.S Billboard 200; RIAA Certification: Platinum; U.S. sales: 724,000+; Singles: "Thief's Theme", "Bridging the Gap", "Just a Moment |
| 2006 | Nas - Hip Hop Is Dead: Released: December 19, 2006; Chart Positions: #1 U.S Billboard 200; RIAA Certification: Gold; U.S. sales: 785,000; Singles: "Hip Hop Is Dead", Can't Forget About You |
| 2006 | Tre Williams - Street Gospel (The Old Test Of Men): Released: January 11, 2006; Singles: What You Gon Do, Luv U Better |
| 2006 | Nashawn - Napalm: Released: July 4th, 2006 |
| 2008 | Bravehearts - Bravehearted 2: Released: April 22, 2008 |
| 2008 | Nas - Untitled: Released: July 15, 2008; Chart positions: #1 U.S Billboard 200; RIAA Certification: Gold; U.S. sales: 500,000; Singles: "Hero", Make the World Go Round" |

== See also ==
Mass Appeal Records
