= AZ discography =

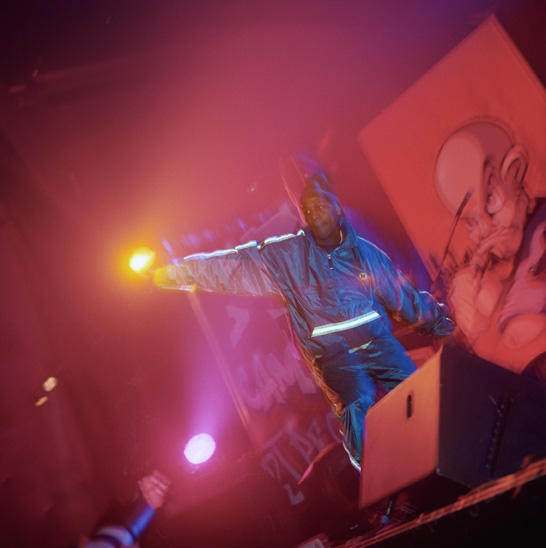
- AZ performing in Hamburg in 1997
- Studio albums: 10
- Compilation albums: 10
- Singles: 27

The discography of AZ, an American rapper, consists of 10 studio albums, one collaborative album, 10 compilation albums and 27 singles.

== Albums ==
=== Studio albums ===
List of studio albums, with selected chart positions
| Title | Album details | Peak chart positions | | | |
| Title | Album details | US | US R&B/HH | US Rap | US Indie |
|---|---|---|---|---|---|
| Doe or Die | Released: October 10, 1995; Label: EMI; Formats: CD, LP, cassette, digital download | 15 | 1 | 1 | 1 |
| Pieces of a Man | Released: May 19, 1998; Label: Noo Trybe/Virgin; Formats: CD, LP, cassette, digital download | 22 | 5 | 1 | 1 |
| 9 Lives | Released: June 12, 2001; Label: Motown; Formats: CD, LP, cassette, digital download | 23 | 4 | 1 | 1 |
| Aziatic | Released: June 11, 2002; Label: Motown; Formats: CD, cassette, digital download | 29 | 5 | 1 | 1 |
| A.W.O.L. | Released: September 6, 2005; Label: Quiet Money; Formats: CD, LP, digital download | 73 | 17 | 10 | 5 |
| The Format | Released: November 7, 2006; Label: Quiet Money, Fast Life Music; Formats: CD, LP, digital download | — | 59 | 2 | 35 |
| Undeniable | Released: April 1, 2008; Label: Fast Life Music, Koch; Formats: CD, digital download | 141 | 24 | 9 | 18 |
| Legendary | Released: June 2, 2009; Label: Real Talk Entertainment; Formats: CD, digital download | — | — | — | — |
| Doe or Die II | Released: September 10, 2021; Label: Quiet Money; Formats: CD, digital download | — | — | — | — |
| Truth Be Told | Released: December 1, 2023; Label: Quiet Money; Formats: digital download | — | — | — | — |
| Doe or Die III | Released: May 8, 2026; Label: Mass Appeal Records; Formats: CD, digital download | — | — | — | — |
"—" denotes a recording that did not chart or was not released in that territory. "*" denotes a record chart that wasn't published at that time.

=== Collaboration albums ===
List of collaboration albums, with selected chart positions and certifications
| Title | Album details | Peak chart positions | | | | | | Sales | Certifications |
| Title | Album details | US | US R&B/HH | CAN | FRA | NL | UK | Sales | Certifications |
|---|---|---|---|---|---|---|---|---|---|
| The Firm: The Album (with The Firm) | Released: October 21, 1997; Label: Aftermath, Interscope, Columbia; Formats: CD, LP, CS, MD | 1 | 1 | 8 | 54 | 51 | 82 | US: 925,000 (Note: Sales as of 2008.) | MC: Gold |

=== Compilations and other releases ===
- S.O.S.A. (Save Our Streets AZ) (2000)
- Decade 1994–2004 (2004)
- Final Call (The Lost Tapes) (2004/2008)
- The Memphis Sessions (The Remix-Tape) (2007)
- N4L (Ni**az for Life) (Hosted by DJ Absolut) (2008)
- Anthology (B-Sides & Unreleased) (2008)
- G.O.D. (Gold, Oil & Diamonds) (2009)
- Doe or Die: 15th Anniversary (2010)
- Lost & Found (2019)

=== Mixtapes ===
- The Return of S.O.S.A (2005)
- The Game of Life (2007)
- Return of S.O.S.A (Part 2) (2008)
- Last of a Dying Breed (L.O.D.B) (Hosted by AZ and DJ Mr. FX) (2013)
- Last of a Dying Breed II (Hosted by AZ and DJ Mr. FX) (2013)
- Return of S.O.S.A (Part 3) (2016)
- Legacy (Hosted by DJ Doo Wop) (2019)
- Legacy (Freestyles & Features Edition) (Hosted by DJ Doo Wop) (2019)

== Singles ==
| Year | Title | Chart positions | | | Certifications | Album |
| Year | Title | US | US R&B/HH | US Rap | Certifications | Album |
|---|---|---|---|---|---|---|
| 1995 | "Sugar Hill" (featuring Miss Jones) | 25 | 12 | 3 | RIAA: Gold | Doe or Die |
| 1995 | "Gimme Yours" (featuring Nas) | 115 | 51 | 30 | | Doe or Die |
| 1996 | "Doe or Die" | — | 69 | 24 | | Doe or Die |
| 1997 | "Hey AZ" (featuring SWV) | — | 50 | 19 | | Non-album single |
| 1997 | "Firm Biz" (as The Firm featuring Dawn Robinson) | — | — | — | | The Firm: The Album |
| 1997 | "Phone Tap" (as The Firm featuring Dr. Dre) | — | — | — | | The Firm: The Album |
| 1998 | "What's the Deal" (featuring Kenny Greene) | — | — | — | | Pieces of a Man |
| 2001 | "Problems" | — | 90 | 34 | | 9 Lives |
| 2001 | "Everything's Everything" (featuring Joe) | — | — | — | | 9 Lives |
| 2001 | "I'm Back" (featuring Daddy Rose) | — | 63 | — | | Aziatic |
| 2002 | "The Essence" (with Nas) | — | — | — | | Aziatic |
| 2002 | "Take It Off" | — | — | — | | Aziatic |
| 2005 | "The Come Up" | — | — | — | | A.W.O.L. |
| 2007 | "The Format" | — | — | — | | The Format |
| 2008 | "Undeniable" | — | — | — | | Undeniable |
| 2010 | "Feel My Pain" | — | — | — | | Doe or Die: 15th Anniversary |
| 2013 | "We Movin'" | — | — | — | | Non-album singles |
| 2014 | "Red Magic" | — | — | — | | Non-album singles |
| 2015 | "Back to Myself" (featuring Soshy) | — | — | — | | Non-album singles |
| 2017 | "Save Them" (featuring Raekwon and Prodigy) | — | — | — | | Non-album singles |
| 2019 | "It's Time" | — | — | — | | Non-album singles |
| 2020 | "Found My Niche" | — | — | — | | Doe or Die II |
| 2020 | "Different" | — | — | — | | Doe or Die II |
| 2021 | "The Wheel" (featuring Jaheim) | — | — | — | | Doe or Die II |
| 2021 | "Motorola Era" (featuring 2 Chainz) | — | — | — | | Doe or Die II |
| 2022 | "Respect Mines" | — | — | — | | Truth Be Told |
| 2023 | "The GOAT" | — | — | — | | Truth Be Told |
| 2023 | "This Is Why" | — | — | — | | Truth Be Told |
| 2023 | "How We Get It" (featuring Fat Joe) | — | — | — | | Truth Be Told |
| 2026 | "So High (featuring Mumu Fresh) | — | — | — | | Doe or Die III |

== Guest appearances ==
List of non-single guest appearances, with other performing artists, showing year released and album name
| Title | Year | Other artist(s) | Album |
|---|---|---|---|
| "The Genesis" | 1994 | Nas | Illmatic |
| "Life's a Bitch" | 1994 | Nas | Illmatic |
| "A+Z" | 1996 | A+ | The Latch-Key Child |
| "I Miss You (Come Back Home)" [Remix] | 1996 | Monifah | Moods...Moments |
| "When the Cheering Stops" | 1996 | Ray Buchanan, Scott Galbraith, Zhane | NFL Jams |
| "Album Intro" | 1996 | Nas | It Was Written |
| "Affirmative Action" | 1996 | The Firm | It Was Written |
| "Lady" (DJ Premier Remix) | 1996 | D'Angelo | 12" |
| "La Familia" (unreleased) | 1997 | The Firm | 12" |
| "Firm Biz (Remix)" | 1997 | The Firm | 12" |
| "Head Over Heels (Remix)" | 1997 | Allure, Tone | 12" |
| "Something About You" (Darkchild Remix) | 1997 | New Edition | 12" |
| "Rock Me" | 1998 | Jermaine Dupri | Caught Up (soundtrack) |
| "Groove On" {unreleased} | 1998 | Half-a-Mil | —N/a |
| "Promises" | 1998 | LaTocha Scott, Ray Buchanan | NFL Jams 2 |
| "Life Goes On" | 1998 | Kid Capri, Common, Allure, Case | Soundtrack to the Streets (UK Version) |
| "24/7" (Remix) | 1999 | Kevon Edmonds | —N/a |
| "Let's Live" | 1999 | Union, Animal | Hard Labor |
| "It's War" | 1999 | DJ Skribble | Traffic Jams 2000 |
| "Thug Connection" | 1999 | Papoose, Kool G Rap | none |
| "Quiet Money (Blood Money)" | 2000 | Half-a-MIl | Milíon |
| "Takin' ova da Streets" {unreleased} | 2000 | The Bleach Brothers | —N/a |
| "Layaway" | 2001 | Jon B. | Pleasures U Like |
| "The Flyest" | 2001 | Nas | Stillmatic |
| "Holla Back" | 2002 | Kool G Rap, Nawz, Tito | The Giancana Story |
| "Keep Lovin' You" | 2002 | Dave Hollister | Things in the Game Done Changed |
| "Redemption" | 2004 | Cormega | Legal Hustle |
| "Untouchables" | 2004 | DJ Kay Slay, Prodigy, Raekwon | The Streetsweeper, Vol. 2 |
| "Professional Style" | 2006 | The Alchemist | Chemistry Files |
| "The Hardest" | 2007 | Styles P | The Ghost Sessions |
| "No Holding Back" | 2007 | Statik Selektah, Cormega | Spell My Name Right: The Album |
| "Who Am I Exclusive" | 2007 | Cormega, Nature | Who Am I?: The Soundtrack |
| "Cold Outside" | 2007 | Begetz, Half a Mill | Ghetto Pass |
| "Too Real" | 2008 | Foxy Brown | Brooklyn's Don Diva |
| "It's So Hard" | 2008 | Styles P, Ali Vegas | D-Block Origins |
| "Road to Success" | 2008 | ASN | Made for This |
| "On the Road" | 2008 | ASN, Fuc That, P.A., Keisha Shontelle | none |
| "Harbor Masters" | 2009 | Ghostface Killah, Inspectah Deck | Wu-Tang Chamber Music |
| "Boy Meets Girl" | 2009 | Sheek Louch | Life on D-Block |
| "What Up" | 2009 | Sheek Louch, Hell Rell | Life on D-Block |
| "Under Pressure" | 2010 | T-Bizzy | Lost in Translation |
| "Winner" | 2010 | Black Sheep | From the Black Pool of Genius |
| "Blue Collar MCs" | 2010 | Kool Sphere | Integritty |
| "See the Light" | 2010 | Ghostface Killah, Raekwon | More Than Just a DJ |
| "Legendary Weapons" | 2011 | Ghostface Killah, M.O.P. | Legendary Weapons |
| "VI" | 2011 | Cormega, Nature | Raw Forever |
| "86" (Remix) | 2013 | Raekwon, Altrina Reece | none |
| "Messin' with You" | 2013 | Justine Skye, Joey Badass | Everyday Living |
| "No Surrender" | 2014 | Peja, DJ Decks | Książę aka. Slumilioner |
| "The Battlefield" | 2014 | Ghostface Killah, Kool G Rap, Tre Williams | 36 Seasons |
| "Here I Go Again" | 2014 | Ghostface Killah, Rell | 36 Seasons |
| "Double Cross" | 2014 | Ghostface Killah | 36 Seasons |
| "Pieces to the Puzzle" | 2014 | Ghostface Killah | 36 Seasons |
| "Blood in the Streets" | 2014 | Ghostface Killah | 36 Seasons |
| "MARS (The Dream Team)" | 2014 | Cormega, Redman, Styles P | Mega Philosophy |
| "Motivation" | 2016 | A$AP Twelvyy, Da$h | The Cozy Tapes |
| "All Eyez Against Me" | 2017 | CHG Unfadable | Lifestyle |
| "Honest Truth" | 2018 | 38 Spesh | Son of G Rap |
| "The Game" | 2019 | Erick Sermon, Styles P, Mic Cheks | Vernia |
| "Growing Up In These Streets" | 2020 | DJ Kay Slay, Ghostface KIllah, Raekwon | Living Legend |
| "Full Circle" | 2020 | Nas featuring The Firm | King's Disease |
| "99 Avirex" | 2021 | Westside Gunn, Stove God Cooks | Hitler Wears Hermes 8: Side B |
| "Vacheron" | 2021 | Rick Ross | Richer Than I Ever Been |
| "Carnival" | 2022 | Logic | Vinyl Days |
| "Born Hustler" | 2022 | Kool G Rap, 38 Spesh | —N/a |
| "Sammy Sosa" | 2023 | Samsohn | —N/a |
| "Locked In" | 2024 | Ghostface KIllah | Set the Tone (Guns & Roses) |
| "Super Immaculate" | 2025 | ElCamino | The Outcome |
| "Trumpets" | 2025 | Masta Killa, N.O.R.E., Uncle Murda | Balance |
| "My Story Your Story" | 2025 | Nas, DJ Premier | Light-Years |
