= Decade 1994–2004 =

Greatest hits album by AZ
- Released: October 12, 2004
- Genre: Hip hop
- Length: 154:46 (Disc 1: 79:38, Disc 2: 75:08)
- Label: BEC

AZ chronology
Aziatic (2002)	Decade 1994–2004 (2004)	A.W.O.L. (2005)

Decade 1994–2004 is the 10-year career anniversary double disc greatest hits album of rapper AZ. It featured his landmark songs from all of his previous albums, along with a number of B-Sides, remixes, and unreleased tracks. It also featured some of AZ's best guest appearances.

== Track listing ==
Disc I
No.	Title	Producer	Length
1.	"Life's a Bitch" (featuring Nas)	L.E.S., Nas	2:44
2.	"Sugar Hill"	L.E.S.	2:49
3.	"Your World Don't Stop" (Original Version)	Spunk Bigga	3:14
4.	"Uncut Raw"	Loose	2:46
5.	"Doe or Die" (Remix) (featuring Raekwon)	RZA	1:48
6.	"Mo Money, Mo Murder" (featuring Nas)	DR Period	4:15
7.	"Sosa"	Trackmasters	2:01
8.	"Payback"	Goldfinga & Gucci Jones	3:04
9.	"How Ya Livin'" (featuring Nas)	L.E.S.	3:47
10.	"The Birth" (featuring RZA)	RZA	3:03
11.	"Love Is Love" (featuring Half a Mill and Nature)	Goldfinga, Gucci Jones & AZ	4:37
12.	"Affirmative Action" (featuring The Firm)	Dave Atkinson, Trackmasters	3:59
13.	"Affirmative Action" (Remix) (featuring The Firm)	Dave Atkinson, Trackmasters	3:45
14.	"Firm Biz" (Remix) (featuring The Firm, Half a Mill and Mary J. Blige)	L.E.S.	4:26
15.	"Phone Tap" (featuring The Firm)	Dr. Dre, Chris "The Glove" Taylor	3:05
16.	"Hey AZ" (featuring Coko of SWV)	Trackmasters	4:03
17.	"Problems"	Chop D.I.E.S.E.L.	4:02
18.	"At Night"	Chop D.I.E.S.E.L.	3:50
19.	"Let Us Toast"	Mahogany Music	2:45
20.	"I Don't Give a Fuck"	Chop D.I.E.S.E.L.	3:33
21.	"I'm Back"	Buckwild	1:36
22.	"Hustler"	Chop D.I.E.S.E.L.	1:17
23.	"Paradise"	Miller Time	2:34
24.	"The Flyest" (featuring Nas)	L.E.S	3:51
25.	"Essence" (featuring Nas)	Baby Paul	2:58
Total length:			79:38

Disc II
No.	Title	Producer	Length
1.	"Thoro"		1:31
2.	"Final Call"		4:11
3.	"Magic Hour" (featuring C.L. Smooth)	Tone Mason	3:02
4.	"Hold No Grudge"		3:33
5.	"I'm Your Man"		3:03
6.	"Side to Side"	AZ, Deo	3:53
7.	"We Gone Make It Right" (featuring Ma$e)		3:23
8.	"Sunshine"		3:49
9.	"Everything Is Everything" (featuring Nas)	DJ Eddie F, Darren Lighty	4:37
10.	"Platinum Bars"		0:50
11.	"Time" (featuring Nature and Nas)	Dr. Dre	3:56
12.	"Life Goes On" (featuring Common, Allure and Case)		3:52
13.	"It's Yours" (Remix)		4:02
14.	"Enjoy Yourself"		3:52
15.	"Redemption" (featuring Cormega)	Emile	3:22
16.	"Gangsta Shit" (featuring Doo Wop)		4:20
17.	"Fan Mail"	Miller Time	3:20
18.	"I'm Ready" (featuring Trav)		4:05
19.	"Let Me Know"	AZ, GV	3:42
20.	"Stretch Armstrong Freestyle"		1:37
21.	"Gimme Yours" (Remix)	Erick Sermon	2:59
22.	"Rather Unique"	Pete Rock	4:38
Total length:			75:08
