= Hank Levine =

Director and filmmaker

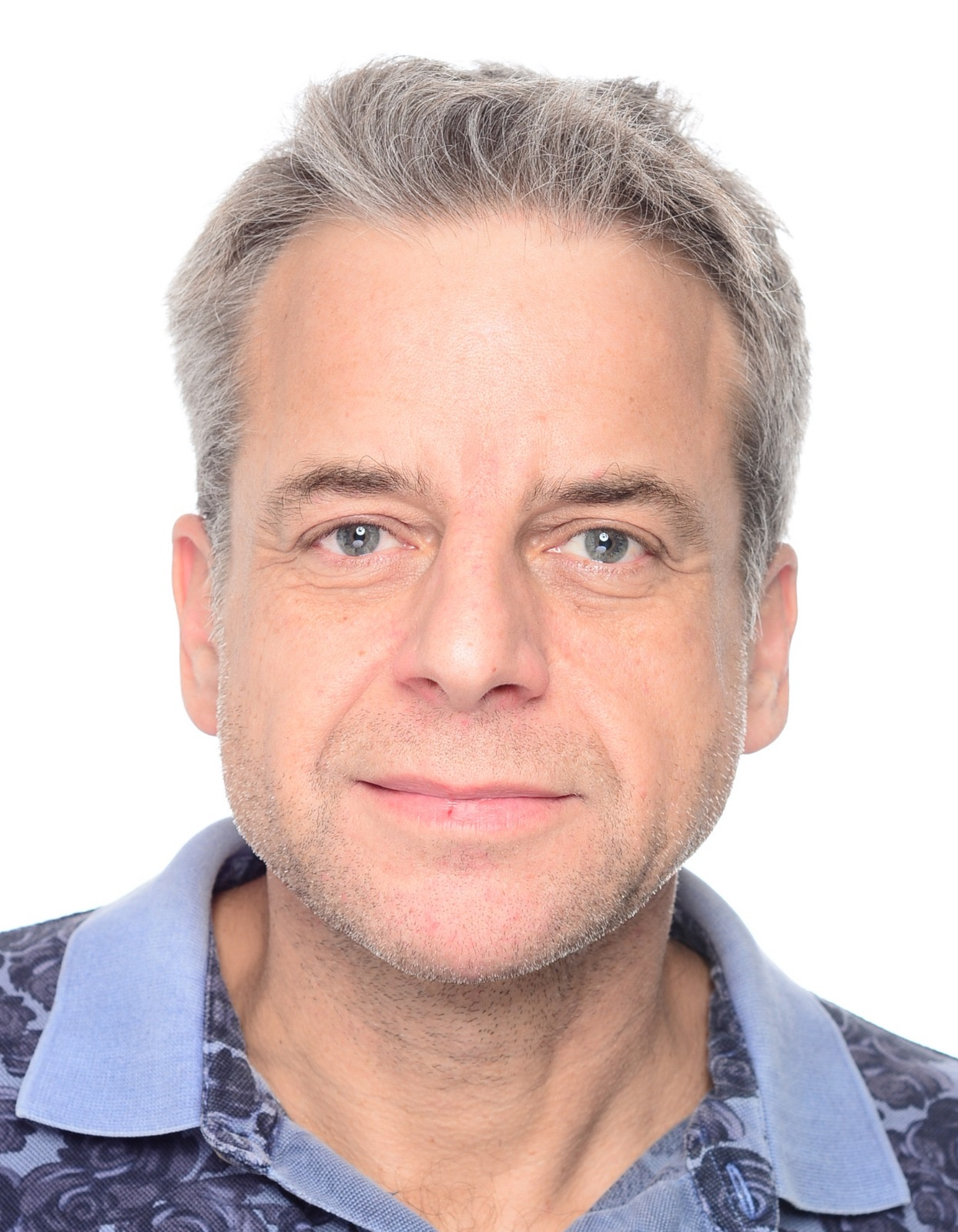
- Born: Hans-Werner Maria Levy; 29 June 1965 (age 61); Bonn, West Germany (now Germany)
- Other name: Hans-Werner Maria Stumpf
- Education: Free University of Berlin; University of Bonn; University of California, Los Angeles
- Occupations: Director; Producer; Author
- Years active: 1993 - present
- Known for: City of God; Wasteland; War Zone

Hans-Werner Maria Levy (born 29 June 1965), better known as Hank Levine, is a German director, documentary filmmaker and writer based in Berlin, Germany. He is known for producing Academy Awards nominated films such as City of God and Wasteland.

== Early life ==
Levine was born in Bonn, West Germany in 1965 and spent his childhood years in Hennef (Sieg). He graduated from high school in 1985 and studied law at the university town of Marburg for a few semesters. Between 1988 and 1990, he attended University of Bonn where he studied economics. From 1990 to 1993, Levine attended Free University of Berlin where he studied journalism. From 1994, Levine attended University of California, Los Angeles's Extension Program where he studied advertising and feature film production.

== Career ==
During his time at UCLA, Levine started shooting avant-garde short films and in 1993, he directed his first short film The Flying Dutchmen which premiered at the 43rd Berlin International Film Festival. In 1995, he founded the production company Hank Levine Film GmbH. In 1996, Levine collaborated with Maggie Hadleigh-West and produced the documentary, War Zone, under the banner of Hank Levine Film GmbH. War Zone was filmed over several years and was premiered at the 48th Berlin International Film Festival in 1998.

Levine's documentaries and feature films focus on environment, human-rights and socio-political conflicts. In 2000, Levine moved to Brazil where he collaborated with the Brazilian film director, Fernando Meirelles and produced City of God for Meirelles's production company O2 Filmes. In 2005, Levine directed and produced a sports documentary, Ginga: The Soul of Brazilian Football, based on football in Brazil. The film was nominated at Prêmio Contigo! de Cinema Nacional awards in 2007, in the category Best Director and Best Documentary.

In 2010, Levine produced Rosa Morena, a Danish-Brazilian drama film directed by Carlos Augusto de Oliveira. The film premiered at the São Paulo International Film Festival in 2010. Later that year, he produced Waste Land directed by Lucy Walker. The film chronicles the life of the artist Vik Muniz. City of God and Waste Land were nominated under the several award categories at the 76th and the 83rd Academy Awards respectively.

In the year 2014, Levine produced Futuro Beach, a Brazilian-German drama film directed by Karim Aïnouz and starring Wagner Moura, Clemens Schick and Jesuíta Barbosa. The film premiered at the 64th Berlin International Film Festival and was nominated for the Golden Bear and Silver Bear awards.

In 2017, Levine produced and directed Exodus - Where I Come From is Disappearing. The film documents the story about people as refugees and asylum seekers at the various part of the world. The film's narration was written by Taiye Selasi and was narrated by Wagner Moura. The film was part of the Reykjavík International Film Festival in the year 2017.

Levine produced and directed Dialogue Earth in 2019, a feature-length documentary based on the life of the German artist Ulrike Arnold.

== Selected filmography ==
| Year | Film | Credited as | | Notes |
| Year | Film | Director | Producer | Notes |
|---|---|---|---|---|
| 1993 | The Flying Dutchmen | Yes | Yes | Short film |
| 1995 | Ocean Blue | No | Yes | Short film |
| 1998 | The Original Sin | No | Yes | Short film |
| 1998 | War Zone | No | Yes | Documentary |
| 1999 | Hidden Agenda | No | Yes (co-executive producer) | Feature film |
| 2000 | Waterproof | No | Yes (executive producer) | Feature film |
| 2000 | Deus Jr. | No | Yes | Feature film |
| 2002 | City of God | No | Yes | Feature film |
| 2005 | Ginga: The Soul of Brazilian Football | Yes | Yes | Documentary |
| 2010 | Pesadelo | Yes | Yes | Short film |
| 2010 | Rosa Morena | No | Yes | Feature film |
| 2010 | Waste Land | No | Yes | Documentary |
| 2011 | Abandonados | Yes | Yes | Documentary |
| 2011 | Barcelona or Barsakh | Yes | Yes | Documentary |
| 2014 | Futuro Beach | No | Yes | Feature film |
| 2017 | Exodus Where I Come from Is Disappearing | Yes | Yes | Documentary |
| 2019 | Dialogue Earth | Yes | Yes | Documentary |
