= Doe or Die III =

Studio album by AZ
- Released: May 8, 2026
- Recorded: 2025
- Genres: East Coast hip-hop; boom bap
- Length: 34:30
- Labels: Quiet Money; Mass Appeal
- Producers: K-Def; Ron Browz; Large Professor; Mike & Keys; Statik Selektah; Buckwild; Bink; N.O. Joe

AZ chronology
Truth Be Told (2023)	Doe or Die III (2026)

Singles from Doe or Die III
- 1. "So High" Released: April 10, 2026

Doe or Die III is the eleventh studio album by American rapper AZ. It was released by AZ's Quiet Money Records and Nas' Mass Appeal Records on May 8, 2026. The album features guest appearances from Jadakiss, Mumu Fresh, Nas, and the first ever appearance of AZ's son Amar Noir. It serves as a sequel to his 2021 album Doe or Die II.

== Background ==
Three years after the release of Doe or Die II, AZ announced that a third album in the series was initially scheduled to be released in late 2025 to coincide with the 30th anniversary of his debut album Doe or Die (1995). In April 2026, Mass Appeal Records announced that the album would be released on May 8, 2026.

== Track listing ==
Doe or Die III track listing
No.	Title	Writer(s)	Producer	Length
1.	"The Origin (Intro)"	Anthony Cruz; Kevin Hansford	K-Def	1:23
2.	"No Need for Lactose"	Cruz; Rondell Edwin Turner	Ron Browz	2:14
3.	"Gimme the World" (featuring Jadakiss)	Cruz; Jason Terrance Phillips; William Paul Mitchell	Large Professor	3:04
4.	"Uniqueness"	Cruz; Mike & Keys	Mike & Keys	3:42
5.	"So High" (featuring Mumu Fresh)	Cruz; Maimouna Youssef; Roosevelt Harrell III	Bink	3:28
6.	"Ho Happy (Skit)"	Cruz; Mike & Keys	Mike & Keys	1:54
7.	"Still Jackie"	Cruz; Patrick Owen Baril	Statik Selektah	2:43
8.	"Surprise" (featuring Nas)	Cruz; Nasir Jones; Mike & Keys	Mike & Keys	2:48
9.	"Fresh Water"	Cruz; Martin; Roosevelt Harrell III	Bink	3:22
10.	"Winners Win" (featuring Amar Noir)	Cruz; Amar Noir; Anthony Best	Buckwild	3:14
11.	"I Was Once There Too"	Cruz; Patrick Owen Baril	Statik Selektah	2:13
12.	"Love My Life"	Cruz; Joseph Johnson	N.O. Joe	2:15
13.	"We Made It (Outro)"	Cruz; Rondell Edwin Turner	Ron Browz	2:00
Total length:				32:02
