= Milíon =

Studio album by Half a Mill
- Released: May 9, 2000
- Recorded: 1998–2000
- Genre: East Coast hip hop; gangsta rap
- Length: 67:03
- Label: Warlock Records
- Producer: David Grippi (exec.); JC Calendar (exec.); Half a Mill (also co-exec.); Orande "Mr. Ryp" Stout (also co-exec.); 40 and Beat Team; Curt Gowdy; DJ Ali; DJ Scratch; Just Blaze; Mike "Punch" Harper; Norman Glover; Poke and Tone; Self Service; Sha-Self; The Neptunes

Half a Mill chronology
Milíon (2000)	Da Hustle Don't Stop (2002)

Professional ratings
Review scores
Source	Rating
AllMusic	4/5 stars
RapReviews	7.5/10 stars

Milíon is the debut studio album by American rapper Half a Mill. It was released on May 9, 2000, via Warlock Records. Production was handled by several record producers, including DJ Scratch, Just Blaze, Trackmasters and The Neptunes. It features guest appearances from Ali Vegas, AZ, Kool G Rap, Musolini, Nature, N.O.R.E. and Spice 1. The album peaked at number 91 on the Billboard Top R&B/Hip-Hop Albums chart and sold 40,000 copies.

== Track listing ==
No.	Title	Producer(s)	Length
1.	"Intro"		0:32
2.	"Tuff Guy" (featuring Ali Vegas)	Mike "Punch" Harper	4:27
3.	"What U Ridin" (featuring Nature)	Curt Gowdy	5:27
4.	"New Millennium"	40 and Beat Team	4:13
5.	"Quiet Money" (featuring AZ)	Poke and Tone	4:59
6.	"Don't Go Away"	DJ Scratch	4:45
7.	"Where BK At"	DJ Ali; Half-A-Mill	4:11
8.	"Fires in Hell"	Just Blaze	3:56
9.	"Some Niggaz"	Norman Glover	3:56
10.	"Thug Onez" (featuring Noreaga, Musalini and Kool G Rap)	The Neptunes	4:22
11.	"Gimme Ya Luv"	Half-A-Mill; Orande "Mr. Ryp" Stout	4:05
12.	"Ghetto Girl"	Sha-Self	3:57
13.	"Thug Luv"	Just Blaze	5:19
14.	"Bounce" (featuring Spice 1)	Self Service	4:02
15.	"Outro"		0:38
16.	"Thuggest Enemy #1"	DJ Ali; Half-A-Mill	4:13
Total length:			1:07:03

== Charts ==
Chart (2000)	Peak position
US Top R&B/Hip-Hop Albums (Billboard)	91
