= Pieces of a Man (AZ album) =

Studio album by AZ
- Released: April 7, 1998
- Recorded: 1997−98
- Studio: Daddy's House; Electric Lady Studios (New York, NY); The Hit Factory (New York, NY); Right Track Recording (Manhattan, NY); House of Sound (New York, NY); Funhouse Recording (New York, NY)
- Genre: East Coast hip-hop; mafioso rap
- Length: 54:03
- Label: Noo Trybe
- Producer: Trackmasters (also exec.); Goldfinga; Gucci Jones; Kenny "Smoove" Kornegay; L.E.S.; Nashiem Myrick; RZA; Tony Dofat

AZ chronology
The Album (1997)	Pieces of a Man (1998)	S.O.S.A. (Save Our Streets AZ) (2000)

Singles from Pieces of a Man
- 1. "Hey AZ" Released: July 21, 1997

Professional ratings
Review scores
Source	Rating
AllMusic	4/5 stars
RapReviews	8/10

Pieces of a Man is the second solo studio album by American rapper AZ. It was released on April 7, 1998, via Noo Trybe Records. The album was produced by Trackmasters, Goldfinga, Gucci Jones, L.E.S., Kenny Kornegay, Nashiem Myrick, RZA, and Tony Dofat. It features guest appearances from the Firm, Half-A-Mil, Monifah, RZA, and Panama P.I. The album peaked at No. 22 on the Billboard 200 and at No. 5 on the Top R&B/Hip-Hop Albums in the United States.

The album was highly praised for its complex and insightful lyricism. The first single was intended to be "Hey AZ" featuring SWV, which peaked at No. 50 on the Hot R&B/Hip-Hop Songs. Music video for "Hey AZ" was shot, but the song was included only in the Japanese edition of the project.

== Track listing ==
No.	Title	Writer(s)	Producer(s)	Length
1.	"New Life" (Album Intro)	Anthony Cruz; Jean Louis Pinot Pudour; Calvin Jones	Goldfinga; Gucci Jones	1:22
2.	"I'm Known"	Cruz; Pudour; C. Jones	Goldfinga; Gucci Jones	2:11
3.	"How Ya Livin'" (featuring Nas)	Cruz; Nasir Jones; LeShan Lewis	L.E.S.	4:30
4.	"Trading Places"	Cruz; Jean-Claude Olivier; Samuel Barnes	Poke & Tone	3:43
5.	"What's the Deal"	Cruz; Olivier; Barnes	Poke & Tone	3:56
6.	"Love Is Love" (featuring Half-A-Mil and Nature)	Cruz; Olivier; Barnes	Poke & Tone	5:14
7.	"The Pay Back"	Cruz; Pudour; C. Jones	Goldfinga; Gucci Jones	3:06
8.	"Just Because"	Cruz; Lewis	L.E.S.	2:53
9.	"SOSA"	Cruz; Olivier; Barnes	Poke & Tone	2:05
10.	"It's a Boy Thing" (featuring Nature)	Cruz; Olivier; Barnes	Poke & Tone	4:02
11.	"Pieces of a (Black) Man"	Cruz; Olivier; Barnes	Poke & Tone	3:44
12.	"Last Dayz" (featuring Monifah)	Cruz; Kenny Kornegay; Darryl Young; Robert Kelly	Kenny 'Smoove' Kornegay; Darryl "88" Young (co.)	5:19
13.	"Whatever Happened (The Birth)" (featuring RZA)	Cruz; Robert Diggs	RZA	3:37
14.	"Trial of the Century" (featuring Foxy Brown and Panama P.I.)	Cruz; Nashiem Myrick	Nashiem Myrick	4:27
15.	"Betcha Don't Know"	Cruz; Tony Dofat	Tony Dofat	3:54
Total length:				54:03

Japanese edition bonus track
No.	Title	Writer(s)	Producer(s)	Length
16.	"Hey AZ" (featuring SWV)	Cruz; Olivier; Barnes	Poke & Tone

Sample credits

- Track 1 contains a sample from "Feeling Good" by Nina Simone, and a sample from "Happy Birthday Maggie" by Hans Zimmer.
- Track 3 contains a sample from "Show Me" by Glenn Jones.
- Track 7 contains samples from "Like a Tattoo" by Sade.
- Track 8 contains a sample of the recording "The Glow of Love" by Change.
- Track 16 contains a sample from "Hey DJ" as performed by the World's Famous Supreme Team.

== Charts ==
Chart (1998)	Peak position
US Billboard 200	22
US Top R&B/Hip-Hop Albums (Billboard)	5
