= Mala Reignz =

American rapper

- Born: Adrienne Malave; The Bronx, NY, U.S.
- Genres: Hip hop; R&B; Pop
- Occupations: Rapper; songwriter; singer
- Years active: 2004–present
- Website: badgirlreignz.com scholarvmg.com

Mala Reignz (born Adrienne Malave) is a Bronx native rapper, performer and writer. She is known for her songs Hey Love and Make You Smile which received exposure on MTV and through The Source. While joining Sway Calloway and Killer Mike as a guest on MTV's RapFixLive, she was told by Killer Mike that Make You Smile "sounds like it belongs on the radio", adding that the difference here being her stories and perspective "diametrically set her apart."

She has appeared on Ali Vegas' Mixtape "Leader of the New School" hosted by Statik Selektah (she also makes an appearance in Vegas' new video "That's Nothin'" (prod. by Scott Storch). She was recognized by Rocksteady Crew and was asked to perform in the female cipher (Sara Kana, Miss NaNa, Rece Steele, Patty Duke, DJ Chela) at their 31st anniversary concert along with the likes of KRS-One, Fat Joe, DJ Premier, Bahamadia, Ice-T and many more artists.

Her debut music video, "BX Til I Die" was picked up by the interactive television music source Music Source On Demand nationwide. Mala has collaborated with other well known female MCs such as Lil' Mama, Rece Steele and Byata (winner and 2nd runners up on VH1's Miss Rap Supreme).
