= Player Hating: A Love Story =

- Directed by: Maggie Hadleigh-West
- Written by: Maggie Hadleigh-West
- Produced by: Maggie Hadleigh-West
- Starring: Half a Mill
- Cinematography: Emmanual Bastien; Kristen Eccker; Steve McCauley
- Edited by: Kim Connell; Laurie MacMillan
- Music by: Half a Mill
- Release date: June 2010 (Sheffield DocFest)
- Running time: 95 mins
- Country: United States
- Language: English

Player Hating: A Love Story is a 2010 documentary film about Brooklyn rapper Half a Mill, written and directed by Maggie Hadleigh-West.

== Premise ==
The documentary follows Half a Mill and his Brooklyn crew, The Godfia Criminals, as they record and struggle to launch Milíon, Half a Mill's latest album. Player Hating explores the connections of poverty, alienation, gangs, and violence in the lives of young "thugs".
