= Firm Biz =

Single by The Firm featuring Dawn Robinson

from the album The Album
- Released: September 24, 1997
- Recorded: Crescent Moon Studios (Miami, Florida)
- Genre: Hip hop; R&B
- Length: 3:50
- Label: Aftermath; Interscope
- Songwriters: Nasir Jones; Anthony Cruz; Inga Merchand; Leshawn Lewis; Mary Brockert; Allen McGrier
- Producer: L.E.S.

Nas singles chronology
"Escobar '97" (1997)	"Firm Biz" (1997)	"Phone Tap" (1997)

AZ singles chronology
"Hey AZ" (1997)	"Firm Biz" (1997)	"Phone Tap" (1997)

Foxy Brown singles chronology
"Get Me Home" (1996)	"Firm Biz" (1997)	"Phone Tap" (1997)

"Firm Biz" is the debut single by the hip hop supergroup The Firm from their singular collaborative LP The Album. The song was produced by L.E.S., who based the song's track on a sample of Teena Marie's 1981 hit "Square Biz". "Firm Biz" also features a chorus performed by former En Vogue singer Dawn Robinson, reworked from the "Square Biz" chorus. AZ raps the first verse of the song, Nas the second, and Foxy Brown the third and final verse. The song did not reach any US chart positions, but was a UK top 20 hit in 1997. A remix of the song was released, featuring a verse from Half-A-Mill and a chorus by Mary J. Blige, replacing Dawn Robinson. The word "feds" is censored in the explicit version, in verse 2, performed by Nas, when he raps "Never that though Black .4-4's for feds".

== Music video ==
A music video was released soon after the release for the single. In the beginning of the video, it shows a man trying to rob a bank. While the man is riding on his car and trying to flee, Nas and AZ are planning to catch him. The video was directed by Hype Williams.

== Cover versions ==
A remix of "Firm Biz" was performed by Nicki Minaj on her 2008 mixtape Sucka Free, as "Firm Biz '08" featuring Jadakiss.

== Charts ==
Chart (1997)	Peak position
Canada Dance/Urban (RPM)	22
European Hot 100 Singles (Music & Media)	73
Netherlands (Dutch Top 40 Tipparade)	9
Netherlands (Single Top 100)	53
New Zealand (Recorded Music NZ)	25
Scottish Singles Sales (Official Charts)	49
UK Singles (Official Charts)	18
UK Hip Hop/R&B (Official Charts)	4
US R&B/Hip-Hop Airplay (Billboard)	35

=== Year-end charts ===
Chart (1997)	Position
UK Urban (Music Week)	18
