= For All Seasons =

Studio album by Nature
- Released: September 19, 2000
- Recorded: 1998–1999
- Genre: Hip hop
- Length: 48:29
- Label: Trackmasters; Columbia
- Producer: Trackmasters (also exec.); Nature (co-exec.); Killa (co-exec.); Curt Gowdy; Dan Stonier; Ez Elpee; Gavin Allen; L.E.S.; Lord Jamar; Ski; Tim "Tyme" Riley

Nature chronology
The Album (1997)	For All Seasons (2000)	Wild Gremlinz (2002)

For All Seasons is the debut studio album by American rapper Nature, released on September 19, 2000 by Trackmasters and Columbia Records. The album was produced mainly by Trackmasters.

== Critical reception ==
Professional ratings
Review scores
Source	Rating
AllMusic	4/5 stars
The Source	3/5 stars

Matt Conaway of AllMusic praised Nature for being "an exceptionally flamboyant and charismatic MC" throughout the record, highlighting "Young Love", "I Remember" and "It's a Man's World" for showcasing his storytelling abilities. He concluded that: "Though he delivers a compelling debut, there are stretches of outdated productions that kept the record from joining the ranks of classic debuts from his borough's now-luminary figures (Run-D.M.C., Rakim, LL Cool J and Nas)." Spin called the album "a crafty platter of metaphysical flair, compelling boy-meets-girl/girl-caps-boy-for-fucking-around narratives, and vivid ghetto reminiscences that recall Nas' early poetics." Vibe contributor David Bry felt that Nature's lyrics were "run-of-the-mill" and had "a profound lack of engaging hooks", concluding that: "Although it offers a brief, pleasant flashback to Cali's hip-hop heyday, For All Seasons fails to live up to contemporary Queensbridge quality. It's a professional but largely uninspired effort." Shaheem Reid, in a review for The Source, commended Nature's lyrical abilities, saying that he is "conjuring up cinematically vivid images", but criticized the album for the lack of diversity, both in lyrics and vocal delivery, as well as in its production, which he thought was "as bland as white rice".

== Track listing ==
No.	Title	Producer(s)	Length
1.	"Intro"	Dan Stonier; Gavin Allen	1:04
2.	"Man's World"	Trackmasters	4:13
3.	"We Ain't Friends"	Lord Jamar	3:41
4.	"Shit Like This"	L.E.S.	3:00
5.	"The Ultimate High" (featuring Nas)	Ski	4:59
6.	"Young Love"	Curt Gowdy	3:43
7.	"Go Ahead"	Lord Jamar	5:02
8.	"Nature's Shine"	Trackmasters	3:24
9.	"Smoke"	Trackmasters	3:42
10.	"Remember"	Ez Elpee	4:30
11.	"Talking That Shit"	Trackmasters	3:33
12.	"I Don't Give a Fuck"	Tim "Tyme" Riley	3:38
13.	"Don't Stop"	Trackmasters	4:00
Total length:			48:29

== Charts ==
Chart (2000)	Peak position
US Billboard 200	50
US Top R&B/Hip-Hop Albums (Billboard)	13
