= S.O.S.A. (Save Our Streets AZ) =

Compilation album by AZ
- Released: 2000
- Recorded: 2000
- Genre: Hip-hop
- Length: 31:49
- Producer: Chop D.I.E.S.E.L.; DR Period

AZ chronology
Pieces of a Man (1998)	S.O.S.A. (Save Our Streets AZ) (2000)	9 Lives (2001)

Professional ratings
Review scores
Source	Rating
Allmusic	link
The Source	4/5 stars

S.O.S.A. (Save Our Streets AZ) is a compilation album made to promote AZ's then-upcoming album 9 Lives. It features ten tracks, and has songs that are not found on AZ's other albums along with songs that ended up making it on the 9 Lives album. It was distributed in the streets, as AZ was a free agent at the time and was in the process of finding a new label after Noo Trybe Records let him go.

== Track listing ==
1. "Intro"
2. "I Don't Give a Fuck Now"
3. "Problems"
4. "Bodies Gotta Get Caught"
5. "Let Us Toast"
6. "Platinum Bars"
7. "Love Me in Your Special Way"
8. "That's Real" (featuring Beanie Sigel)
9. "Animal Skit (You Ain't from Brooklyn)"
10. "It B's Like That" (featuring Animal)

== Samples ==
Problems

- "All This Love" by Debarge

Let Us Toast

- "I Forgot to Be Your Lover" by The Mad Lads

Love Me in Your Special Way

- "Love Me in a Special Way" by DeBarge
