= Wild Gremlinz =

Studio album by Nature
- Released: May 28, 2002
- Studio: Comfort Zone Studios (New York, NY); Heavy Hitter Studios; Soundtrack Studios (New York, NY); SPK Room Lab (Queens, NY)
- Genre: Hip hop
- Length: 52:23
- Label: Sequence Records
- Producer: John Wallace (exec.); Killa (exec.); Nature (exec.); Dee "Pitboss" (co-exec.); Dre Weston (co-exec.); Gene Nelson (co-exec.); Shadow (co-exec.); Vin The Chin; Blanco; Now & Laterz; Wild Gremlinz; SPK; Megahertz; Darrell "Digga" Branch; Jay Garfield

Nature chronology
| For All Seasons (2000) | Wild Gremlinz (2002) | Pain Killer (2008) |

Professional ratings
Review scores
| Source | Rating |
|---|---|
| HipHopDX | 3.5/5 |
| The Source | 2.5/5 stars |

Wild Gremlinz is the second studio album by American rapper Nature. It was released on May 28, 2002, through Sequence Records. Recording sessions took place at Comfort Zone Studios, Soundtrack Studios and SPK Room Lab in New York City, and at Heavy Hitter Studios. Production was handled by Vin The Chin, Blanco, Wild Gremlinz, Darrell "Digga" Branch, Jay "Waxx" Garfield, Megahertz, SPKilla and The Now And Laters. It features guest appearances from Bars, Killz, Young Katz, A-Dog, G.S., Masta and Sabotage. The album peaked at number 150 on the Billboard 200, number 21 on the Top R&B/Hip-Hop Albums and number 9 on the Independent Albums chart in the United States.

== Track listing ==
| No. | Title | Writer(s) | Producer(s) | Length |
|---|---|---|---|---|
| 1. | "Intro" | Jermaine Baxter; Vin Mostacciuolo | Vin The Chin; Wild Gremlinz (co.) | 1:27 |
| 2. | "The Wake Up" | J. Baxter; Mostacciuolo | Vin The Chin; Wild Gremlinz (co.) | 1:03 |
| 3. | "Wild Gremlinz" (featuring Masta, A-Dog and Young Katz) | J. Baxter; B. Baxter; Alton Jackson; D. Jackson; Mostacciuolo | Vin The Chin; Wild Gremlinz (co.) | 3:20 |
| 4. | "So Fresh" | J. Baxter; Benjamin Vargas | Now & Laterz; Wild Gremlinz | 3:54 |
| 5. | "The Ride" | J. Baxter; Edwin Almonte | SPK | 3:07 |
| 6. | "I Don't Give a Fuck" | J. Baxter; Mostacciuolo | Vin The Chin; Wild Gremlinz (co.) | 1:35 |
| 7. | "Take That" (featuring G.S.) | J. Baxter; T. Jefferson; Mostacciuolo | Vin The Chin; Wild Gremlinz (co.) | 5:12 |
| 8. | "Love That Hoe" (featuring Bars and Young Katz) | J. Baxter; Shawn C. McFadden; D. Jackson; Scott Gazzola | Blanco; Wild Gremlinz (co.) | 4:23 |
| 9. | "What Cha Know" | J. Baxter; Dorsey Wesley | Megahertz | 3:26 |
| 10. | "Get Gully" (featuring Bars) | J. Baxter; McFadden; Darrell Branch | Darrell "Digga" Branch | 4:12 |
| 11. | "Who R U?" (featuring Killz and Sabotage) | J. Baxter; A. Munson; J. McDonald; Gazzola | Blanco; Wild Gremlinz (co.) | 4:21 |
| 12. | "Supa High" | J. Baxter; Gazzola | Blanco; Wild Gremlinz (co.) | 3:39 |
| 13. | "Life & Death" | J. Baxter; Mostacciuolo | Vin The Chin; Wild Gremlinz (co.) | 4:16 |
| 14. | "Coming Home With Me" (featuring Killz) | J. Baxter; Munson; Mostacciuolo | Vin The Chin; Wild Gremlinz (co.) | 4:24 |
| 15. | "Disturbin the Peace" | J. Baxter; Jay Garfield | J "Waxx" Garfield | 4:04 |
| Total length: | | | | 52:23 |

Sample credits

- Track 4 contains sample of "Nobody Beats The Biz" by Biz Markie.

== Personnel ==
- Jermaine "Nature" Baxter — vocals, executive producer, sleeve notes
- B. "Masta" Baxter — vocals (track 3)
- Alton "A-Dog" Jackson — vocals (track 3)
- D. "Young Katz" Jackson — vocals (tracks: 3, 8)
- T. "GS" Jefferson — additional vocals (track 7)
- Swails "Bars" McFadden — vocals (track 8), additional vocals (track 10)
- A. "Killz" Munson — vocals (tracks: 11, 14)
- J. "Sabotage" McDonald — vocals (track 11)
- Vin "The Chin" Mostacciuolo — producer (tracks: 1–3, 6, 7, 13, 14), recording (tracks: 1–3, 6, 7, 10, 13, 14), mixing (track 6)
- Benjamin "Ben Grimm" Vargas — producer (track 4)
- Wild Gremlinz — producer(s) (track 4), co-producer(s) (tracks: 1–3, 6–8, 11–14)
- Edwin "SPKilla" Almonte — producer & recording (track 5)
- Scott "Blanco" Gazzola — producer (tracks: 8, 11, 12), recording (tracks: 4, 8, 11, 12)
- Dorsey "Megahertz" Wesley — producer (track 9)
- Darrell "Digga" Branch — producer (track 10)
- Jay "Waxx" Garfield — producer (track 15)
- Kamel — recording (track 9)
- Taurus Braxton-Harvey — recording (track 15)
- Ryan West — mixing (tracks: 1–5, 7, 8, 10–15)
- Cliff Clutreri — mastering
- John Wallace — executive producer
- Killa — executive producer
- Dee Sonaram — co-executive producer
- Dre Weston — co-executive producer
- Gene Nelson — co-executive producer
- "Shadow" Stokes — co-executive producer
- Chad Hogan — art direction, design
- Matthew Salacuse — photography

== Charts ==
| Chart (2002) | Peak position |
|---|---|
| US Billboard 200 | 150 |
| US Top R&B/Hip-Hop Albums (Billboard) | 21 |
| US Independent Albums (Billboard) | 9 |
