= Final Call (The Lost Tapes) =

Studio album by AZ
- Released: November 11, 2008
- Recorded: 2003–2004
- Genre: Hip-hop
- Length: 53:08
- Label: Koch
- Producer: Tone Mason; DJ Absolut; Young Calvin; Frado; Metaphysic; AZ; Deo; Baby Paul; Buckwild; GV

AZ chronology
Undeniable (2008)	Final Call (The Lost Tapes) (2008)	Anthology (B-Sides & Unreleased) (2008)

Final Call (The Lost Tapes) is a previously unreleased studio album by rapper AZ, recorded in 2003 and 2004. It was originally set to be released in 2004 but was shelved because of a two-month early leak on the internet and press. Instead of Final Call the album A.W.O.L. was released in 2005 and included the three songs "Magic Hour", "The Truth" and "Live Wire" of Final Call as bonus tracks. In 2008 Final Call was finally released under AZ's new label Koch Records.

== Track listing ==
Track list according to Amazon

No.	Title	Producer	Length
1.	"Freedom (Interlude)" (featuring Lemon)	Tone Mason
2.	"Talkin' Gangsta" (featuring Tony Sunshine)	Metaphysic
3.	"Quiet Money Anthem" (featuring Nu & Young)	Tone Mason
4.	"Seems That Way"	Frado
5.	"I Am AZ"	AZ
6.	"Gangsta MC's (Interlude)" (featuring Lemon)	Tone Mason
7.	"Live Wire"	Buckwild
8.	"Magic Hour" (featuring CL Smooth)	Tone Mason
9.	"Girls R Free"	Baby Paul
10.	"You Know" (featuring Rell)	Baby Paul
11.	"Omega"	Tone Mason
12.	"The Truth" (featuring Ralo)	DJ Absolut, Young Calvin
13.	"No Strings"	Baby Paul
14.	"Side 2 Side" (featuring Ron G)	AZ, Deo
15.	"Let Me Know"	AZ, GV
Total length:			53:08
