= 9 Lives (AZ album) =

Studio album by AZ
- Released: June 12, 2001
- Recorded: 1999–2001
- Genre: East Coast hip-hop; gangsta rap
- Length: 50:18
- Label: Motown
- Producer: AZ (exec.); Damien "DEO" Blyden (exec.); Kedar Massenburg (exec.); Big Shy; Bink!; Chop Diesel; Darren Lighty; Derryck "Tank" Thornton; DR Period; Eddie F; Mahogany; Miller Time; Qur'an Goodman; Tydro; Ty Fyffe

AZ chronology
S.O.S.A. (Save Our Streets AZ) (2000)	9 Lives (2001)	Aziatic (2002)

Singles from 9 Lives
- 1. "Problems" Released: March 20, 2001; 2. "Everything's Everything" Released: July 10, 2001; 3. "AZ's Back" Released: 2002

Professional ratings
Review scores
Source	Rating
AllMusic	2.5/5 stars
HipHopDX	3.5/5
RapReviews	8/10
Vibe	3.5/5

9 Lives is the third solo studio album by American rapper AZ. It was released on June 12, 2001, under the Motown imprint. Production was handled by twelve record producers, including Bink!, Darren Lighty, Eddie F and Ty Fyffe. It features guest appearances from Ali Vegas, Amil, Beanie Sigel, Foxy Brown and Joe. The album peaked at number 23 on the Billboard 200 and number 4 on the Top R&B/Hip-Hop Albums charts.

== Track listing ==
No.	Title	Writer(s)	Producer(s)	Length
1.	"Intro"	Anthony Cruz; Sheron Scriven; Damien Blyden	Big Shy	1:28
2.	"What Cha Day About" (featuring Ali Vegas)	Cruz; Ollie Williams; Blyden	Qu'ran Goodman	4:03
3.	"I Don't Give a Fuck"	Cruz; Mark Curry; Blyden	Chop D.I.E.S.E.L.	3:36
4.	"At Night"	Cruz; Curry; Blyden	Chop D.I.E.S.E.L.	3:53
5.	"AZ's Back"	Cruz; Derryck Thornton; William Ed Pettaway Jr.	Derryck "Tank" Thornton	3:35
6.	"Problems"	Cruz; Curry; Blyden	Chop D.I.E.S.E.L.	4:08
7.	"Everything's Everything" (featuring Joe)	Cruz; Edward Ferrell; Darren Lighty; Clifton Lighty III; Balewa Muhammad	Eddie F; Darren Lighty	4:36
8.	"That's Real" (featuring Beanie Sigel)	Cruz; Dwight Grant; Roosevelt Harrell III	Bink Dog	4:19
9.	"What Y'all Niggas Want" (featuring Foxy Brown)	Cruz; Curry; Blyden	Chop D.I.E.S.E.L.	3:30
10.	"Let's Toast"	Cruz; Imsomie Leeper	Mohogany	3:59
11.	"How Many Wanna" (featuring Amil)	Cruz; Robert Miller; Blyden	Miller Time	3:52
12.	"Love Me"	Cruz; Darryl Pittman	DR Period	3:42
13.	"Quiet Money TBS"	Cruz; Animsi; T. Cotrell; K. Walker	Ty Fyffe; Tydro	4:56
14.	"Outro"	Cruz; Scriven; Blyden	Big Shy	0:40
Total length:				50:18

Sample credits

- Intro and Outro
  - "I Can't See Me Without You" by The Main Ingredient
- Problems
  - "All This Love" by DeBarge
- Love Me
  - "Love Me in a Special Way" by DeBarge

Notes

- "Quiet Money TBS" features uncredited verses from three unknown emcees.

== Charts ==
Chart (2001)	Peak position
US Billboard 200	23
US Top R&B/Hip-Hop Albums (Billboard)	4
