= War Zone (film) =

- Directed by: Maggie Hadleigh-West
- Written by: Maggie Hadleigh-West
- Produced by: Hank Levine
- Starring: Maggie Hadleigh-West
- Release date: 1998
- Running time: 76 minutes
- Countries: United States; Germany
- Language: English

War Zone is a 1998 documentary film about street harassment in the United States, written and directed by Maggie Hadleigh-West.

== Synopsis ==
Hadleigh-West turns her camera on men throughout the United States, asking them why they whistle at or make comments at women who pass them on the street. In response, some men feel compelled to apologize, hit her, yell at her, or engage her in conversation. "Through these conversations, Hadleigh-West reveals the anger, fear and frustration as well as the affection, admiration and humor that characterizes relationships between men and women."
