= G.O.D. (Gold, Oil & Diamonds) =

Mixtape by AZ
- Released: June 30, 2009
- Recorded: 2008–2009
- Genre: Hip-hop
- Length: 37:27
- Label: Siccness.net; E1
- Producer: The Batkave; Dave Moss

AZ chronology
Legendary (2009)	G.O.D. (Gold, Oil & Diamonds) (2009)	Doe or Die 15th Anniversary (2010)

G.O.D. (Gold, Oil & Diamonds) is a retail mixtape by rapper AZ. It was released on June 30, 2009 through Siccness.net. Due to scheduling conflicts with another label and close similarities in the album names, Sicness.net released AZ's second album of 2009, which was previously titled I Am Legend.

== Track listing ==
No.	Title	Producer	Length
1.	"Hustle in My Blood"	The Batkave	4:03
2.	"What It Sounds Like" (featuring Charlie Rock and Young Sau)	Dave Moss	2:55
3.	"Game Ain't Changed"	Dave Moss	3:04
4.	"Run from Me" (featuring Smigg Dirtee and Obnoxious)	The Batkave	3:26
5.	"Live Your Life" (featuring DJ Craig Mack)	Dave Moss	3:25
6.	"Get Low" (featuring Smigg Dirtee)	The Batkave	4:07
7.	"Bonafied" (featuring Obnoxious)	Dave Moss	2:55
8.	"The Reverand" (featuring I-Rocc)	The Batkave	3:57
9.	"AZ's Behind This" (featuring Smigg Dirtee)	The Batkave	3:39
10.	"Havin' My Baby" (featuring Tommy Redding)	The Batkave	3:41
11.	"Do Me This Way"	Dave Moss	2:47
12.	"Outro"		1:28
Total length:			37:27
