= Maggie Hadleigh-West =

American film and TV producer (born 1958)

- Born: October 1, 1958 (age 66); Fairbanks, Alaska, U.S.
- Occupation(s): Documentarian, activist, television producer
- Years active: 1990s—present
- Website: yomaggie.com

Maggie Hadleigh-West (born October 1, 1958) is an American filmmaker and activist.

== Early life and education ==
Hadleigh-West was born in Fairbanks, Alaska to parents; Katherine Talbot a legal secretary and Frederick Hadleigh West a college professor in Archeology and Anthropology, both of whom grew up in New Orleans, Louisiana. As a child, she was influenced by 1960s radical politics and economic injustice. After the divorce of her parents in 1970, her mother moved with Hadleigh-West and her two brothers Fred Jr. and Dickson to Edina, Minnesota, a suburb of Minneapolis. In high school, Hadleigh-West first picked up a camera, intending to videotape her good friend Joanne Liebeler in character as a gypsy in downtown Minneapolis. While shooting she became distracted by a pimp in full 1970's regalia, a moment in her development she believes pointed directly to her film Player Hating: A Love Story.

In 1984, Hadleigh-West enrolled at George Washington University where she majored in Visual Communications. For the next ten years, Hadleigh-West worked as a Graphic Designer/Art Director, and later attended graduate school at School of the Visual Arts in New York City where she got her masters in Fine Art. Her thesis was an experimental documentary short titled War Zone (1991, 13 min.) which she later expanded into a feature length War Zone (1998) and launched her career as a filmmaker.

== Film and television career ==
Hadeigh-West's thesis garnered a story in Glamour Magazine which led to a media blitz and the creation of her own company, Film Fatale Productions. Film Fatale's goal is to expose and explore the manifestations of prejudice and oppression in marginalized communities throughout the United States and abroad.

Clients have included: Department of Defense, Department of Justice, the Smithsonian Museum, Williams College, Middlebury College, the Juilliard School, University of California at Berkeley, Albright College, Boys & Girls Clubs of America, juvenile prisons, alternative detention centers, among other clients.

Hadeigh-West has also produced television segments for Lifetime Live, Dateline NBC, Split Screen, and SexTV in Canada.

Hadeigh-West directed Player Hating: A Love Story (2010) which chronicles Brooklyn rapper Half-A-Mil in his journey from obscurity to celebrity inside one of America's most dangerous housing projects.

== Filmography ==
- War Zone (Writer, Director. Documentary Short, 1991)
- War Zone (Writer, Director. Feature Documentary, 1998)

Hadleigh-West travels the US, interviewing the men that harass her, clarifying the connection between sexual harassment and sexual assault. Hadleigh-West coined and defined the term "street abuse" and developed a hierarchy of sexual aggression, which became the dramatic structure for War Zone. War Zone was also nominated one of the Top Ten Films of 1998 by the LA Times, nominated for the Caligari Prize at the Berlin Film Festival, and received worldwide press.

- Stripped (Co-Producer. Feature Documentary, 2001)

Stripped chronicles director Jill Morley's behind the scenes look at the world of exotic dancing.

- Swing State (Supervising Producer. Feature Documentary, 2008)

Swing State chronicles Ohio Lt. Governor, Lee Fisher's emotional 2006 campaign in one of the most contested political campaigns in modern political history.

- Player Hating: A Love Story (Writer, Director, Producer. Feature Documentary, 2010)

Player Hating follows the life of hip-hop artist, Half a Mill from obscurity to fame. This dangerous project explores issues of race, poverty, trauma and survival through characters that experience and participate in violence on a daily basis, yet struggle to escape through music.

- Sick to Death! (Writer, Director. Feature Documentary, 2016)

Sick to Death! follows Maggie after drinking radioactive iodine to kill her over active thyroid, she catapults into illness only to run smack into the medical corruption that leaves 750 million people sick and suffering worldwide.
