= Rosa Morena (film) =

2010 film directed by Carlos Augusto de Oliveira

- Directed by: Carlos Augusto de Oliveira
- Written by: Carlos Augusto de Oliveira; Morten Kirkskov
- Produced by: Hank Levine; Ivan Teixeira; Thomas Gammeltoft
- Starring: Anders W. Berthelsen; Bárbara Garcia; David Dencik; Vivianne Pasmanter; Pablo Rodrigues; Iben Hjejle
- Cinematography: Philippe Kress
- Music by: Frithjof Toksvig
- Production companies: Fine & Mellow Productions; Ginga Eleven
- Distributed by: Vinny Filmes
- Release dates: 22 October 2010 (São Paulo International Film Festival); 11 May 2011
- Running time: 95 minutes
- Countries: Brazil; Denmark
- Languages: Portuguese; Danish; English

Rosa Morena is a 2010 Danish-Brazilian drama film directed by Carlos Augusto de Oliveira. The film premiered at the 2010 São Paulo International Film Festival.

== Plot ==
Unable to adopt a child in Denmark, Thomas, a 42-year-old architect, travels to Brazil to try to realize the dream of being a father. In São Paulo, he meets Jakob, an old Danish friend who introduces him to Maria, a humble young woman who is pregnant from her third child. She enters into an agreement with Thomas to donate the baby in exchange for better living conditions. Thomas moves to the house of Maria and their relationship evolves in unexpected ways.
