= Holly Lang =

American writer

Holly Lang is a New York-based writer, editor and consultant. She was the founding editor of Pine Magazine, an award-winning online-only publication based in Atlanta. She has worked as a reporter for publications and news outlets, including the Birmingham Post-Herald, Southeast Performer and The Associated Press.

== Bibliography ==
- Dr. Dre (2006, Greenwood Publishing Group)
- The Notorious B.I.G.: A Biography (2007, Greenwood Publishing Group)
- How to Procrastinate (Knock Knock Publishing)
- Goodnight Girl
