= The Format (album) =

Studio album by AZ
- Released: November 7, 2006
- Recorded: 2006
- Studio: Chop Shop Studios (Brooklyn, NY)
- Genre: East Coast hip-hop
- Length: 45:55
- Label: Quiet Money; Fastlife
- Producer: Arnold Mischkulnig; Bob Perry; DJ Premier; Emile Haynie; Face Defeat; Fizzy Womack; J. Cardim; Statik Selektah

AZ chronology
A.W.O.L. (2005)	The Format (2006)	Undeniable (2008)

Professional ratings
Review scores
Source	Rating
About.com	4/5 stars
AllHipHop	3.5/5 stars
Cokemachineglow	55/100%
HipHopDX	4/5
RapReviews	8/10
Tiny Mix Tapes	1/5 marks
XXL	3/5 (L)

The Format is the sixth solo studio album by American rapper AZ. It was released on November 7, 2006, via Quiet Money Records. Recording sessions took place at Chop Shop Studios in Brooklyn. Production was handled by Emile Haynie, J. Cardim, Lil' Fame, Arnold Mischkulnig, Bob Perry, DJ Premier, Face Defeat and Statik Selektah. It features guest appearances from Fresh, Big Pooh, Jha-Jha, M.O.P., Phonte, Ralo, and Samson.

The album's lead single is its title track, "The Format", produced by DJ Premier, with "Vendetta" as its B-side. The Format also features the bonus track "Royal Salute", a retaliation to 50 Cent's song "What If", which included a line aimed at AZ. On October 7, 2007, Quiet Money released The Format (Special Edition) adding six bonus tracks, including "Royal Salute".

== Track listing ==
No.	Title	Producer(s)	Length
1.	"I Am the Truth"	Fizzy Womack	3:59
2.	"Sit 'Em Back Slow" (featuring M.O.P.)	Face Defeat; Fizzy Womack	3:48
3.	"Get High"	Emile	3:06
4.	"Make Me" (featuring Fresh)	Emile	3:09
5.	"Games" (featuring Samson)	Bob Perry; Arnold Mischkulnig	3:49
6.	"Rise and Fall" (featuring Rapper Big Pooh and Phonte)	J. Cardim	4:10
7.	"Animal"	Statik Selektah	3:48
8.	"Doing That!" (featuring Jha Jha)	Fizzy Womack	4:06
9.	"This Is What I Do"	J. Cardim	3:18
10.	"The Format"	DJ Premier	3:03
11.	"Vendetta" (featuring Fresh and Ralo)	J. Cardim	3:14
12.	"Game of Life"	Emile	4:05
13.	"Royal Salute"	Emile	2:20
Total length:			45:55

Special Edition bonus tracks
No.	Title	Length
14.	"Life"	3:58
15.	"Seems That Way"	4:07
16.	"You Know"	4:06
17.	"The Love of Money"	3:11
18.	"Damn It Feels Good"	3:48

== Personnel ==
- Anthony "AZ" Cruz – vocals, executive producer
- Jamal "Lil' Fame" Grinnage – vocals (track 2), producer (tracks: 1, 2, 8)
- Eric "Billy Danze" Murray – vocals (track 2)
- Fresh – vocals (tracks: 4, 11)
- Samson – vocals (track 5)
- Thomas Louis "Rapper Big Pooh" Jones III – vocals (track 6)
- Phonte Coleman – vocals (track 6)
- Natoya "Jha Jha" Handy – vocals (track 8)
- Ralo – vocals (track 11)
- Jonathan "Chronic Face" Burke – producer (track 2)
- Emile Haynie – producer (tracks: 3, 4, 12, 13)
- Bob Perry – producer (track 5), co-executive producer, A&R
- Arnold Mischkulnig – producer (track 5), recording, mixing, mastering
- Jonas Cardim – producer (tracks: 6, 9, 11)
- Patrick "Statik Selektah" Baril – producer (track 7)
- Christopher E. "DJ Premier" Martin – producer (track 10)
- Joseph Sherman – co-executive producer, management
- Kaysh Shinn – photography

== Charts ==
Chart (2006)	Peak position
US Top R&B/Hip-Hop Albums (Billboard)	59
US Independent Albums (Billboard)	35
