= Sugar Hill (song) =

Single by AZ

from the album Doe or Die
- Released: June 20, 1995
- Studio: Chung King Studios; Electric Lady Studios (New York)
- Genre: East Coast hip hop
- Length: 4:09
- Label: EMI
- Songwriters: Anthony Cruz; Jerry Barnes; Katreese Barnes
- Producer: L.E.S.

AZ singles chronology
| "Sugar Hill" (1995) | "Gimme Yours" (1995) |

Music video
- "Sugarhill" on YouTube

"Sugar Hill" is the debut single by American rapper AZ. It was released on June 20, 1995 via EMI and is from his debut studio album, Doe or Die (1995). Recording sessions took place at Chung King Studios and Electric Lady Studios in New York. Produced by L.E.S., the song samples Juicy's "Sugar Free". Miss Jones sung the chorus and provided backing vocals.

The single peaked at number 25 on the US Billboard Hot 100 and number 67 on the UK Singles Chart, making it the rapper's highest charting song. It was certified gold by the Recording Industry Association of America on September 7, 1995.

== Track listing ==
12" Vinyl
| No. | Title | Writer(s) | Producer(s) | Length |
|---|---|---|---|---|
| 1. | "Sugar Hill (Album Version)" (featuring Miss Jones) | Anthony Cruz; Jerry Barnes; Katreese Barnes | L.E.S. | 4:48 |
| 2. | "Sugar Hill (Radio Version)" (featuring Miss Jones) | Cruz; J. Barnes; K. Barnes | L.E.S. | 4:48 |
| 3. | "Sugar Hill (Instrumental)" (featuring Miss Jones) | Cruz; J. Barnes; K. Barnes | L.E.S. | 4:53 |
| 4. | "Rather Unique (Album Version)" | Cruz | Pete Rock | 4:51 |
| 5. | "Rather Unique (Radio Version)" | Cruz | Pete Rock | 4:49 |
| 6. | "Rather Unique (TV Track)" | Cruz | Pete Rock | 4:49 |

== Charts ==
| Chart (1995–1996) | Peak position |
|---|---|
| UK Singles (Official Charts) | 67 |
| US Billboard Hot 100 | 25 |
| US Hot R&B/Hip-Hop Songs (Billboard) | 12 |
| US Hot Rap Songs (Billboard) | 3 |
| US Cash Box Top 100 | 17 |

== Certifications ==
| Region | Certification | Certified units/sales |
|---|---|---|
| United States (RIAA) | Gold | 500,000^{^} |
^{^} Shipments figures based on certification alone.
