= Undeniable (AZ album) =

Studio album by AZ
- Released: April 1, 2008
- Recorded: 2006–2008
- Genre: Hip-hop
- Length: 50:05
- Label: Quiet Money; New Era; Koch
- Producer: Emile; Fizzy Womack; Jay "Waxx" Garfield; Large Professor; Mr. Lee; Nottz; Street Radio; The Bad Parts

AZ chronology
The Format (2006)	Undeniable (2008)	Final Call (The Lost Tapes) (2008)

Singles from Undeniable
- 1. "Life On The Line" Released: 2007

Professional ratings
Review scores
Source	Rating
HipHopDX	3/5
PopMatters	7/10
RapReviews	7.5/10
Slant	3/5 stars

Undeniable is the seventh solo studio album by American rapper AZ. It was released on April 1, 2008, through Quiet Money Records and Koch Records. Production was handled by Street Radio, Lil' Fame, Nottz, Emile Haynie, Jay "Waxx" Garfield, Large Professor, Mr. Lee and The Bad Parts, with K.G. & E.C. serving as co-producers. It features guest appearances from Jay Rush, Ray J and Styles P.

In the United States, the album debuted at number 141 on the Billboard 200, number 24 on the Top R&B/Hip-Hop Albums, number 9 on the Top Rap Albums and number 18 on the Independent Albums charts, selling over 5,000 copies in its first week.

== Track listing ==
No.	Title	Writer(s)	Producer(s)	Length
1.	"The Game Don't Stop"	Anthony Cruz; Jamal Grinnage; Robert Perry	Fizzy Womack	4:06
2.	"Superstar"	Cruz	Mr. Lee	4:21
3.	"Life on the Line"	Cruz; Jesse Matthews; Kendred Smith	Street Radio	4:32
4.	"Fire"	Cruz; Dominick Lamb	Nottz	3:13
5.	"What Would You Do" (featuring Jay Rush)	Cruz; Johnathon Jennings	Emile	4:18
6.	"Dead End"	Cruz; Matthews; Smith	Street Radio	3:24
7.	"Parking Lot Pimpin'"	Cruz; Matthews; Smith	Street Radio	4:22
8.	"Undeniable"	Cruz; Perry; Arnold Mischkulnig	The Bad Parts; K.G. & E.C. (co.)	3:23
9.	"Go Getta" (featuring Ray J)		Jay "Waxx" Garfield	4:03
10.	"Now I Know"	Cruz; Lamb	Nottz	3:14
11.	"A Game"	Cruz; Grinnage; Perry	Fizzy Womack	3:24
12.	"The Hardest" (featuring Styles P)	Cruz; David Styles; William Paul Mitchell	Large Professor	3:30
13.	"Jealousy" (Bonus Track)	Cruz		3:57
Total length:				50:05

== Charts ==
Chart (2008)	Peak position
US Billboard 200	141
US Top R&B/Hip-Hop Albums (Billboard)	24
US Top Rap Albums (Billboard)	9
US Independent Albums (Billboard)	18
