= The Album (The Firm album) =

Studio album by The Firm
- Released: October 21, 1997
- Recorded: November 1996 – August 1997
- Studios: Criteria (Miami); Crescent Moon (Miami); Record One (Los Angeles); Doppler (Atlanta)
- Genre: Mafioso rap
- Length: 52:54
- Labels: Aftermath; Interscope
- Producers: Dr. Dre; Trackmasters; Chris "The Glove" Taylor; L.E.S.

Nas chronology
It Was Written (1996)	The Album (1997)	I Am... (1999)

Foxy Brown chronology
Ill Na Na (1996)	The Album (1997)	Chyna Doll (1999)

AZ chronology
Doe or Die (1995)	The Album (1997)	Pieces of a Man (1998)

Nature chronology
The Album (1997)	For All Seasons (2000)

Singles from The Album
- 1. "Firm Biz" Released: September 24, 1997; 2. "Phone Tap" Released: November 11, 1997

Professional ratings
Review scores
Source	Rating
AllMusic	2.5/5 stars
Entertainment Weekly	B+
Los Angeles Daily News	1/4 stars
RapReviews	5.0/10
The Source	3.5/5 stars
The Village Voice	B−

The Album is the only studio album by the American hip-hop supergroup The Firm. It was released on October 21, 1997, by Aftermath Entertainment and Interscope Records. The group was formed by rapper Nas, his manager Steve Stoute, and producers Dr. Dre and Trackmasters. The original lineup — Nas, AZ, Foxy Brown, and Cormega — had first collaborated on the song "Affirmative Action" from Nas' 1996 album It Was Written. Cormega later left the group due to artistic differences with Nas and contract disputes with Stoute, and was replaced by Nature before recording began.

The Album is a concept album centered around themes of the American Mafia and the "gangsta" lifestyle. The project is structured similarly to a compilation, with songs credited individually to the participating artists — whether Firm members or guests — with all performers listed as main artists except Dawn Robinson, who is specifically credited as a featuring artist. There is no song on the album that features all members of the Firm together on a single track, and one song is credited solely to a non-member.

The album's production was handled mainly by Dr. Dre, Chris "The Glove" Taylor, and Trackmasters (operating as Poke and Tone), and it features guest appearances by Dr. Dre, Pretty Boy, Wizard, Canibus, Dawn Robinson, Noreaga, and Half-a-Mill.

The Album received mixed reviews from music critics, who criticized its mainstream pop-oriented sound rather than the members' previous styles. In the United States, the album debuted at number one on the Billboard 200 and also topped the Top R&B/Hip-Hop Albums chart. It also charted in other countries, such as Canada, France and the United Kingdom. The Album sold 147,000 copies in the debut week and has sold over 925,000 copies in the United States and was certified gold in Canada. Two singles were released from the album, with "Firm Biz" peaking at number twelve on the Hot R&B/Hip-Hop Airplay and number eighteen on the UK Singles Chart. Although the album's second single "Phone Tap" failed to chart, it remained the group signature song and it's considered one of Dr. Dre's most enduring productions.

== Background ==
Prior to the formation of The Firm, future members and affiliates of the group were at transitional stages of their careers. Following the acclaim of his landmark debut album Illmatic (1994), Queensbridge-based emcee Nas decided to concentrate his efforts in a mainstream direction. Despite its significant impact on hip-hop at the time, Illmatic did not experience the larger sales of most major releases of the day, due in part to Nas' shy personality and withdrawal from promoting the record. Nas began to make appearances on other artists' work, including "Fast Life" on Kool G Rap's "4,5,6" and "Verbal Intercourse" on Raekwon's Only Built 4 Cuban Linx... (1995). Nas began to dub himself as Nas Escobar on these guest appearances. Meanwhile, his excessive spending habits had left him with little money, as Nas had to ask for a loan to purchase clothes to wear to the 1995 Source Awards. The success of fellow East Coast act The Notorious B.I.G. at the awards show sent a message to Nas to change his commercial approach, resulting in his hiring of Steve "The Commissioner" Stoute as manager. While Illmatic attained gold status, Stoute convinced Nas to aim his efforts in a more commercial direction for his second album, after which Nas enlisted production team the Trackmasters, who were known for their mainstream success at the time.

Meanwhile, Brooklyn-based female rapper Foxy Brown was brought to the attention of the Trackmasters, who were working on LL Cool J's Mr. Smith (1995). After impressing the production team with an on-stage freestyle rap, she earned a guest appearance on Mr. Smith, contributing a verse to the remix of "I Shot Ya". Throughout 1995 and 1996, Brown appeared on several platinum and gold singles, including Jay-Z's "Ain't No Nigga" and the remix of Toni Braxton's "You're Makin' Me High". Her appearances sparked a recording company bidding war in early 1996, leading to her signing to Def Jam Recordings. The success of "I Shot Ya" prompted her inclusion, along with rappers AZ and Cormega, in collaborating with Nas on the song "Affirmative Action" for his second studio album, It Was Written (1996). The collaboration came in the wake of the critical success of AZ's debut album Doe or Die (1995). He initially garnered attention with his appearance on Nas' "Life's a Bitch" (1993). Cormega, whose rapping career had been put on hold due to his incarceration during the early 1990s, was referenced by Nas on "One Love" (1994), and was released from jail in 1995.

Dr. Dre later attributed the album’s disappointing performance in part to difficulties during the recording sessions. He recalled spending only a few days in the studio with the artists and said that scheduling problems limited the amount of time available to work with Foxy Brown. Dre contrasted this with Nas, whom he described as professional and prepared, saying, “Nas was cool. He came in and did his thing.”

Chris “The Glove” Taylor similarly attributed the project’s difficulties to a combination of creative and organizational problems. He criticized the decision to release “Firm Biz” rather than “Phone Tap” as the first single, saying, “‘Phone Tap’ wasn’t the first single. Do you know how many people would have ran out to buy that album if the first thing they heard was that song?” Taylor also cited Cormega’s replacement by Nature, conflicts between the numerous labels and companies involved, and the rushed recording process as contributing factors. He recalled, “There were problems with that project from the beginning,” adding that the album was recorded in Miami partly because the artists were reluctant to record in Los Angeles or on the East Coast following the murder of The Notorious B.I.G.

== Title ==
According to critic Steve "Flash" Juon of RapReviews, the title of the album, as well as the group's name, was inspired by John Grisham's 1991 legal thriller-novel The Firm and the 1993 film adaption of the same name. While it was issued under the title The Album, writers and music critics have referred to the album with such titles as The Firm, Nas, Foxy Brown, AZ, and Nature Present the Firm: The Album, and The Firm — The Album, or The Firm: The Album.

== Track listing ==
No.	Title	Writer(s)	Performer(s)	Length
1.	"Intro"			0:48
2.	"Firm Fiasco"	Anthony Cruz; Nasir Jones; Inga Marchand; Chris Taylor; Andre Young	AZ, Nas and Foxy Brown	4:27
3.	"Phone Tap Intro"			0:34
4.	"Phone Tap"	Cruz; Jones; Taylor; Young; Jermaine Baxter	AZ, Nas, Nature and Dr. Dre	3:46
5.	"Executive Decision"	Baxter; Cruz; Jones; Samuel Barnes; Jean-Claude Olivier; Richard Pimentel	Nas, Nature and AZ	3:43
6.	"Firm Family"	Baxter; Al Goodman; Harry Ray; Sylvia Robinson; Richard Vick	Dr. Dre and Nature	3:59
7.	"Firm All Stars"	Barnes; Marchand; Olivier	Foxy Brown and Pretty Boy	3:20
8.	"Fuck Somebody Else Intro"			1:24
9.	"Fuck Somebody Else"	Marchand; Kenneth Gamble; Leon Huff	Foxy Brown	4:17
10.	"Hardcore"	Barnes; Jones; Marchand; Olivier; James Harris III; Terry Lewis	Foxy Brown and Nas	4:09
11.	"Untouchable"	Jones; Melvin Bradford	Wizard	1:10
12.	"Five Minutes to Flush Intro"			0:47
13.	"Five Minutes to Flush"	Baxter; Young; John Fletcher; Jalil Hutchins; Larry Smith	Nature	4:42
14.	"Desperados Intro"			0:32
15.	"Desperados"	Barnes; Baxter; Cruz; Olivier; Pimentel; Germaine Williams; Wasis Diop	Canibus, AZ and Nature	4:26
16.	"Firm Biz"	Cruz; Jones; Marchand; Anthony Brockert; Leshan Lewis; Allen McGrier	AZ, Nas and Foxy Brown (featuring Dawn Robinson)	3:23
17.	"I'm Leaving"	Barnes; Baxter; Olivier; Victor Santiago	Noreaga and Nature	3:30
18.	"Throw Your Guns"	Barnes; Cruz; Olivier; Jasun Wardlaw	Half-A-Mil and AZ	3:57
Total length:				52:54

Sample credits

- "Phone Tap", samples "Petite Fleur" by Chris Barber's Jazz Band
- "Fuck Somebody Else", samples "You Gonna Make Me Love Somebody Else" by The Jones Girls
- "Hardcore", samples "Your Love (Encore)" by Cheryl Lynn
- "Five Minutes to Flush (Intro)", samples "Hard to Handle" by Etta James
- "Five Minutes to Flush", samples "Five Minutes Of Funk" by Whodini
- "Firm Biz", samples "Square Biz" by Teena Marie
- "Firm All Stars", samples "Turn Off the Lights" by Young Larry
- "Firm Fiasco", samples "A Ma Fille" by Charles Aznavour
- "Firm Family" samples "Come On Sexy Mama" by The Moments
- "Untouchable", samples "Mother Nature" by The Temptations
- "I'm Leaving", samples "I'm Leaving On a Jet Plane" by John Denver
- "Desparados", samples "Dune" by Wasis Diop
- "Executive Decision", samples "Ô Corse île d'amour" by Tino Rossi

== Charts ==
=== Weekly charts ===
Chart (1997)	Peak position
Canadian Albums (Billboard)	8
Dutch Albums (Album Top 100)	51
French Albums (SNEP)	54
US Billboard 200	1
US Top R&B/Hip-Hop Albums (Billboard)	1

=== Year-end charts ===
Chart (1997)	Position
US Billboard 200	197
US Top R&B/Hip-Hop Albums (Billboard)	59

== Certifications ==
Region	Certification	Certified units/sales
Canada (Music Canada)	Gold	50,000^{^}
^{^} Shipments figures based on certification alone.

== See also ==
- List of Billboard 200 number-one albums of 1997
- List of Billboard number-one R&B albums of 1997
