= A.W.O.L. (album) =

Studio album by AZ
- Released: September 6, 2005
- Recorded: 2005
- Genre: East Coast hip-hop
- Length: 54:32
- Label: Fastlife
- Producer: Baby Paul; Buckwild; Disco D; DJ Absolut; DJ Premier; Emile; Fizzy Womack; Frado; J-Hen; Jimi Kendrix; MoSS; The Heatmakerz; Tone Mason; Vinny Idol; Young Calvin

AZ chronology
Aziatic (2002)	A.W.O.L. (2005)	The Format (2006)

Professional ratings
Review scores
Source	Rating
AllMusic	4/5 stars
Cokemachineglow	70/100%
HipHopDX	3/5
IGN	8/10
Now	3/5 Ns
PopMatters	8/10
RapReviews	9/10
Stylus	B

A.W.O.L. is the fifth studio album by American rapper AZ. It was released on September 6, 2005 via Fast Life Music. Production was handled by The Heatmakerz, Baby Paul, Disco D, DJ Premier, Emile Haynie, Frado, J-Hen, Jimi Kendrix, Lil' Fame, MoSS, Vinny Idol, Buckwild, DJ Absolut, Tone Mason and Young Calvin. It features guest appearances from Begetz, Bounty Killer, Ghostface Killah, Half a Mill, Noe, Raekwon and CL Smooth.

In the United States, the album peaked at number 73 on the Billboard 200, number 17 on the Top R&B/Hip-Hop Albums, number 10 on the Top Rap Albums and number 5 on the Independent Albums charts.

The album was supported with four 12" promotional singles: "Serious" b/w "Live Wire", "AZ's Chillin" b/w "Never Change", "The Come Up" b/w "Magic Hour" and "Still Alive" b/w "New York".

== Background ==
The album was recorded after Final Call, which AZ declined to release because his label had pushed its release back two months—according to him, they were also the source of its early leak to the press and the internet. Garnering critical praise with production from highly regarded New York underground acts such as DJ Premier, Buckwild, and DipSet production duo the Heatmakerz, the rapper abandoned his previously money-oriented subject matter, stating that he "wanted it to be all street". A.W.O.L. is the first album AZ released on his own Quiet Money Records imprint. A.W.O.L. 1.5 was released several months later, which included a bonus disc featuring a cappella and instrumental versions to the songs on A.W.O.L..

== Track listing ==
No.	Title	Writer(s)	Producer(s)	Length
1.	"So Sincere"	Anthony Cruz; Gregory Green; Sean Thomas	The Heatmakerz	1:57
2.	"Never Change"	Cruz; Green; Thomas	The Heatmakerz	4:26
3.	"New York" (featuring Raekwon and Ghostface Killah)	Cruz; Dennis Coles; Emile Haynie; Robert Diggs	Emile	3:45
4.	"Can't Stop"	Cruz; Alfredo Rivera	Frado	4:15
5.	"Still Alive" (featuring Noe)	Cruz; Duane Bridgeford; Randy Ousley Jr	Vinny Idol	4:04
6.	"AZ's Chillin'"	Cruz; Jamal Grinnage	Fizzy Womack	3:55
7.	"City of Gods"	Cruz; Darrin Dean	Disco D	4:14
8.	"Street Life" (featuring Half a Mill and Begetz)	Cruz; Jasun Wardlaw; David Cooper	J-Hen	4:33
9.	"Bedtime Story"	Cruz; Paul Hendricks; Kendred Smith	Baby Paul; Jimi Kendrix	2:12
10.	"The Come Up"	Cruz; Chris Martin	DJ Premier	3:46
11.	"Envious" (featuring Bounty Killer)	Cruz; Rodney Price; Jason Connoy	MoSS	2:57
12.	"A.W.O.L."	Cruz; Hendricks; Michael Risko	Vinny Idol	3:39
13.	"Live Wire"	Cruz; Anthony Best	Buckwild	3:21
14.	"Magic Hour" (featuring CL Smooth)	Cruz; Corey Penn; Tone Mason	Tone Mason	3:09
15.	"The Truth"	Cruz; Shaune Muir; K. Compas	DJ Absolut; Young Calvin	4:29
Total length:				54:32

Notes

- Tracks 13, 14 and 15 are one continuous bonus track 13. All the 3 tracks are available separately on Final Call (The Lost Tapes) album.

== Charts ==
Chart (2005)	Peak position
US Billboard 200	73
US Top R&B/Hip-Hop Albums (Billboard)	17
US Top Rap Albums (Billboard)	10
US Independent Albums (Billboard)	5
