= Doe or Die: 15th Anniversary =

Compilation album / Studio album by AZ
- Released: November 30, 2010
- Recorded: 2009–2010
- Genre: Hip hop
- Length: 34:31
- Label: Quiet Money; 7243 8 32631 2 7 E2-32631
- Producer: Frank Dukes; Statik Selektah; Lil' Flame; MoSS; Baby Paul; Nascent; QB; Roctimus Prime; Riggs Morales

AZ chronology
G.O.D. (Gold, Oil & Diamonds) (2009)	Doe or Die: 15th Anniversary (2010)	Doe or Die II (2021)

Singles from Doe or Die: 15th Anniversary
- 1. "Feel My Pain" Released: June 29, 2010

Doe or Die: 15th Anniversary is the 15th anniversary edition of rapper AZ's debut album, Doe or Die, which was released in 1995 and received critical acclaim from music outlets. The album was released on November 30, 2010.

== Overview ==
Doe or Die 15th: Anniversary features production from Frank Dukes, Statik Selektah, Lil' Fame, MoSS, Baby Paul, Nascent, QB, Roctimus Prime and Riggs Morales. The album also features vocals from R&B singer June Summers. All the songs from the original Doe or Die are remixed with a new beat.

== Singles ==
The only single from the album is "Feel My Pain" and it was released on iTunes on June 29, 2010. A music video for "Feel My Pain" was released on June 7, 2010. A second music video for "Gimme Your's 2010" was released on November 29, 2010. The third music video for "The Calm" was released on February 3, 2011.

== Track listing ==
Name	Writer(s)	Producer(s)	Time
1. "Tribute (Intro)"	Anthony Cruz	Nascent and QB	1:39
2. "Feel My Pain"	Anthony Cruz	Frank Dukes	4:08
3. "Gimme Your's (2010)"	Anthony Cruz	Statik Selektah	2:32
4. "Nothing Move" (featuring June Summers)	Anthony Cruz	Roctimus Prime and Co-Produced by Riggs Morales	4:12
5. "Rather Unique (2010)"	Anthony Cruz	Lil' Fame	3:23
6. "The Calm"	Anthony Cruz	Statik Selektah	2:19
7. "Your World Don't Stop (2010)"	Anthony Cruz	Statik Selektah	3:20
8. "I'm Ill"	Anthony Cruz	MoSS	3:39
9. "I Feel 4 U (2010)"	Anthony Cruz	Baby Paul and Beat Fanatik	3:03
10. "Bonus"	Anthony Cruz		6:16
