= Legendary (AZ album) =

Studio album by AZ
- Released: June 2, 2009
- Recorded: 2008–2009
- Genre: Hip-hop
- Length: 39:42
- Label: Real Talk
- Producer: Big Hollis; Cozmo; Maxwell Smart; Real Talk Ent.; Gennesse

AZ chronology
| Anthology (B-Sides & Unreleased) (2008) | Legendary (2009) | G.O.D. (Gold, Oil & Diamonds) (2009) |

Professional ratings
Review scores
| Source | Rating |
|---|---|
| AllMusic | 2.5/5 stars |

Legendary is the eighth studio album by rapper AZ, released on June 2, 2009, through Real Talk Entertainment.

== Track listing ==
| No. | Title | Producer(s) | Length |
|---|---|---|---|
| 1. | "Da Truth (Intro)" | Hollis | 1:06 |
| 2. | "Before It's All Said & Done" | Cozmo | 3:21 |
| 3. | "Livin' the Life" | Cozmo | 3:46 |
| 4. | "Boy Meets Girl" (featuring Sheek Louch) | Maxwell Smart | 4:11 |
| 5. | "Bottom Line (Skit)" | Real Talk Ent. | 0:21 |
| 6. | "Refuse 2 Die" | Cozmo | 3:47 |
| 7. | "Dreams Come True" | Cozmo, Gennesse | 3:15 |
| 8. | "Good for Nothin'" | Cozmo | 3:40 |
| 9. | "Supply & Demand (Skit)" | Real Talk Ent. | 0:35 |
| 10. | "Money Makes the World Go Round" | Cozmo | 3:33 |
| 11. | "What Up" (featuring Sheek Louch and Hell Rell) | Cozmo | 4:23 |
| 12. | "Poli with the Villains" | Cozmo | 3:41 |
| 13. | "Get Money" | Cozmo | 3:04 |
| 14. | "I Told You (Outro)" | Hollis | 1:05 |
| Total length: | | | 39:42 |

Digital bonus tracks
| No. | Title | Producer(s) | Length |
|---|---|---|---|
| 15. | "Before It's All Said & Done (Instrumental)" | Cozmo | 3:20 |
| 16. | "Livin' the Life (Instrumental)" | Cozmo | 3:45 |
| Total length: | | | 46:46 |
