= Ulrike Arnold =

German artist

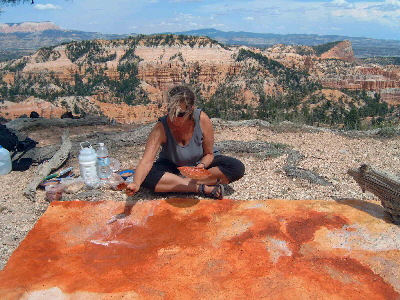
- Ulrike Arnold working in Bryce Canyon in 2000
- Born: 1950 (age 75–76); Düsseldorf
- Education: Kunstakademie Düsseldorf

Ulrike Arnold (born 1950) is a German artist who uses stones, dirt and earth from locations around the world to create abstract paintings.

== Biography ==
Arnold was born in Düsseldorf in 1950; she grew up with three brothers. Her father was a priest and mother was a kindergarten teacher that later stopped work to take care of her children. She studied music and art between 1968 and 1971, afterwards she worked as a teacher. From 1979 until 1986 she studied fine arts at the Düsseldorf academy in Professor Klaus Rinke's class. She was granted the Eduard von der Heydt apprenticeship of Wuppertal in 1988. Since 1980, she has been travelling through all of the continents to work, although she mainly lives and works in Düsseldorf and Flagstaff, Arizona.

== Work as artist ==
=== Earth paintings ===
Earth paintings are typical of Arnold's art as she uses a unique material inspired by prehistoric cave art. She paints pictures with sorts of soil, minerals and stones on nettle fabric and on stone. She collects her colours in form of minerals which she then grinds to a paste for painting. The titles of her pictures correspond to the places across the world where she has found her ingredients, like Flagstaff, Arizona or Bryce Canyon in Utah. The structures, forms and colours of those paintings mirror the quality of the landscape where they are created on site. There they are exposed to the natural conditions of the place which even enhance their intensity.

=== Comet pictures ===
Since 2004, Ulrike Arnold is continuously expanding her repertoire of resources. She is the first artist worldwide to use particles of meteorites (nickel, iron and chondrules) which she purchases from research facilities. Those substances originate from asteroids and comets. Their dark dust bears witness to the early universe. With it, Ulrike Arnold goes beyond the use of terrestric materials to create cosmological pictures.

=== Collections ===
Her art work can be found at many public museums and private collections, such as the North Rhine-Westphalian State Chancellery at Düsseldorf, the Düsseldorf museum of arts, the Ernst & Young collection, also Düsseldorf, at Deutsche Bank, Cologne, GLS bank, Bochum, Dennis Hopper's private collection at Venice, Los Angeles, California, Langen Foundation's collection at Neuss, Center for Art and Environment, Nevada Museum of Art Reno, Nevada or the Vollstedt private collection, the Museum of Northern Arizona, Flagstaff, and the Collection of Marvin and Kitty Killgore Southwest Meteorite Lab, Payson Arizona.

== See also ==
- List of German painters
