= Carlos Augusto de Oliveira =

Brazilian film director (born 1974)

- Born: 1974 (age 51–52); Brazil
- Occupation: Film director
- Years active: 1990s–present
- Known for: Rosa Morena (2011)

Carlos Augusto de Oliveira (born 1974 in Brazil) is a Brazilian film director who has lived in Denmark since 2000.

De Oliveira had his introduction to the film industry in 1992, but studied architecture in Rio de Janeiro before moving to Denmark in 2000 to study film and media in Copenhagen. He joined the film network and alternative film school Super16 in 2003 and graduated in 2006 with Three Summers.

His first feature film, Rosa Morena (2011), received the Prêmio Itamaraty award from the Brazilian Ministry of Foreign Affairs at São Paulo and won him a nomination for Best Director at the Danish Robert Awards.
