= Aziatic =

Studio album by AZ
- Released: June 11, 2002
- Recorded: 2001–2002
- Studio: Sweet Mountain Studios (Englewood, NJ); Power Station (New York, NY)
- Genre: Hip-hop
- Length: 46:58
- Label: Motown
- Producer: Baby Paul; Buckwild; Chop Diesel; DR Period; Larry "Precision" Gates; L.E.S.; Mike Risko; Miller Time; Portiay; Big Joe

AZ chronology
9 Lives (2001)	Aziatic (2002)	A.W.O.L. (2005)

Singles from Aziatic
- 1. "I'm Back" Released: September 18, 2001; 2. "Take It Off" Released: May 7, 2002

Professional ratings
Review scores
Source	Rating
AllMusic	4.5/5 stars
HipHopDX	4.5/5
RapReviews	9/10
Rolling Stone	4/5 stars
The Source	4/5 stars
Stylus	A
The Village Voice	(3-star Honorable Mention)

Aziatic is the fourth solo studio album by American rapper AZ. It was released on June 11, 2002 via Motown. Recording sessions took place at Sweet Mountain Studios in Englewood and Power Station in New York. Production was handled by Chop D.I.E.S.E.L., Buckwild, Miller Time, Precison, Baby Paul, DR Period, L.E.S., Mike Risko, Portiay and Big Joe, with Damian "Deo" Blyden, Kedar Massenburg and AZ serving as executive producers. It features guest appearances from Animal, DJ Rogers Jr., El Shabar, Nas and Trav.

The album peaked at number 29 on the Billboard 200 and number 5 on the Top R&B/Hip-Hop Albums in the United States. Its lead single, "I'm Back", made it to number 63 on the Hot R&B/Hip-Hop Songs. The song "The Essence" off of the album was nominated for a Grammy Award for Best Rap Performance by a Duo or Group at the 45th Annual Grammy Awards, but lost to Outkast's "The Whole World".

== Background ==
After two albums that received vastly differing responses —Pieces of a Man and 9 Lives— AZ's fourth solo full-length is considered the rapper's comeback album, which restored his credibility. The project features AZ's flow and style over melodic, soulful production. It also marks his second and final studio album for Motown Records.

== Track listing ==
No.	Title	Writer(s)	Producer(s)	Length
1.	"Once Again"	Anthony Cruz; Darryl Pittman; John Sebastian	DR Period	2:38
2.	"A-1 Performance"	Cruz; Makeba Riddick; Curtis Richardson; Geoffrey Leib	Portiay	3:53
3.	"Wanne Be There"	Cruz; Mark Curry; Damien Blyden; Maurice Barge; Jimmie Jiles	Chop D.I.E.S.E.L.	3:55
4.	"Take It Off"	Cruz; Shelene Thomas; Leshan Lewis; Herbert N. Middleton	L.E.S.	4:23
5.	"The Essence" (featuring Nas)	Cruz; Nasir Jones; Paul Hendricks; Michael Risko; James A. Johnson	Baby Paul; Mike Risko	3:29
6.	"Hands in the Air" (featuring D.J. Rogers Jr.)	Cruz; Larry Gates	Precision	4:14
7.	"Fan Mail"	Cruz; Robert Miller; Blyden; Leonard Caston Jr.; Terri McFaddin	Miller Time	3:36
8.	"Paradise (Life)"	Cruz; Miller; Blyden; Vinnie Barrett; Bruce Hawes	Miller Time	2:54
9.	"Take Care of Me"	Cruz; Sherree Ford; Gates	Precision	3:41
10.	"I'm Back" (featuring El Shabar)	Cruz; Terry Williford; Anthony Best; Frank Edward Wilson; Caston Jr.; Pamela Joan Sawyer	Buckwild	3:12
11.	"Hustler" (featuring Trav and Animal)	Cruz; Trevor Carroll; Curry; Blyden; Dennis Edwards; Otis Williams; Damon Harris; Richard Street; David English	Chop D.I.E.S.E.L.	4:08
12.	"Re-Birth"	Cruz; Best; Keith Mansfield	Buckwild	2:00
13.	"Aziatic (Outro)"	Cruz; Curry; Blyden	Chop D.I.E.S.E.L.	1:07
14.	"Doing Me" (Bonus Track)	Cruz; Donald Woolfolk	Big Joe	3:48
Total length:				46:58

Sample credits

- Track 1 contains elements from "Welcome Back" written and performed by John Sebastian.
- Track 2 contains elements from "She Can Wait Forever" written by Geoffrey Leib and performed by George Duke.
- Track 3 embodies portions from "I Just Want to Be There" written by Maurice Barge and Jimmie Jiles and performed by The Independents.
- Track 5 contains elements from "Musical Love" written by Rick James and performed by the Mary Jane Girls.
- Track 7 embodies portions from "Each Day I Cry a Little" written by Leonard Caston Jr. and Terri McFaddin and performed by Eddie Kendricks.
- Track 8 contains elements from "Just As Long As We Have Love" written by Vinnie Barrett and Bruce Hawes and performed by Wilbert Longmire.
- Track 10 embodies portions from "Loving You the Second Time Around" written by Frank Wilson, Leonard Caston Jr. and Pam Sawyer and performed by Eddie Kendricks.
- Track 11 embodies portions from "I'm a Bachelor" written by Dennis Edwards, Otis Williams, Damon Harris, Richard Street and David English and performed by The Temptations.
- Track 12 contains elements from "Important Project" written and performed by Keith Mansfield.

Notes

- "A-1 Performance" features additional vocals by Makeba Riddick.
- "Wanna Be There" features uncredited vocals by Chimere Scott.
- "Take It Off" features additional vocals by Shelene Thomas.
- "Take Care of Me" features additional vocals by Sherree Ford.

== Personnel ==
- Anthony "AZ" Cruz – vocals, executive producer
- Nasir "Nas" Jones – vocals (track 5)
- D.J. Rogers, Jr. – vocals (track 6)
- Terry "El Shabar" Williford – vocals (track 9)
- Trav – vocals (track 11)
- Animal – vocals (track 11)
- Makeba Riddick – additional vocals (track 2)
- Chimere Scott – additional vocals (track 3)
- Shelene Thomas – additional vocals (track 4)
- Londell "Nikko" Smith – background vocals (track 6)
- Sherree Ford – additional vocals (track 9)
- Darryl "DR Period" Pittman – producer (track 1)
- Portiay – producer (track 2)
- Mark "Chop D.I.E.S.E.L." Curry – producer (tracks: 3, 11, 13)
- Leshan "L.E.S." Lewis – producer (track 4)
- "Baby Paul" Anthony Hendricks – producer (track 5)
- Mike Risko – producer (track 5)
- Larry "Precision" Gates – producer (tracks: 6, 9)
- Robert "Miller Time" Miller – producer (tracks: 7, 8)
- Anthony "Buckwild" Best – producer (tracks: 10, 12)
- Big Joe – producer (track 14)
- Damien "DEO" Blyden – recording, executive producer, A&R
- Mike Thomas – recording
- Chris Athens – mastering
- Kedar Massenburg – executive producer
- Annalee Valencia-Bruch – art direction, design
- Clay Patrick McBride – photography
- Sandy Brummels – creative director
- Orrin Ennis – A&R
- Liz Loblack – production management
- Monica Morrow – stylist

== Charts ==
Chart (2002)	Peak position
US Billboard 200	29
US Top R&B/Hip-Hop Albums (Billboard)	5
