= Doe or Die II =

Studio album by AZ
- Released: September 10, 2021
- Genres: Hip-hop; East Coast hip-hop; boom bap
- Length: 44:40
- Labels: Quiet Money; 300; Sparta
- Producers: Alchemist; Aone Beats; Bink; Buckwild; Pete Rock; The Heatmakerz; P Soul; KayGee; The Czar-Keys; Rockwilder; Baby Paul; Statik Selektah; Bud'da

AZ chronology
Doe or Die: 15th Anniversary (2010)	Doe or Die II (2021)	Truth Be Told (2023)

Singles from Doe or Die II
- 1. "Found My Niche" Released: May 15, 2020; 2. "Different" Released: December 4, 2020; 3. "The Wheel" Released: July 30, 2021; 4. "Motorola Era" Released: December 31, 2021

Doe or Die II is the ninth studio album by American rapper AZ. It was released on September 10, 2021, by Quiet Money Records. Serving as a sequel to his 1995 debut Doe or Die. The album features guest appearances from Lil Wayne, Rick Ross, Jaheim, Conway the Machine, Dave East, T-Pain, and Idris Elba. The album was supported by the singles "Different" and "The Wheel". The deluxe edition was released on January 28, 2022, It features additional guest appearances from Inky Johnson and 2 Chainz.

== Background ==
Originally announced in October 2009, Doe or Die II sat in development hell for 12 years. In an interview in December 2009, AZ stated that he hoped to enlist the original production team from Doe or Die including L.E.S., Pete Rock, DR Period, and Buckwild. He also expressed a desire to enlist producers DJ Toomp, Dr. Dre, and Kanye West, as well as reach out to longtime collaborator Nas for a guest feature. The intended lead single, "Feel My Pain", produced by Frank Dukes, was released in May 2010. Later that year, Baby Paul of Da Beatminerz confirmed that he would be producing for the album and serving as its executive producer. In October, AZ suggested that the album was nearly complete but stated that Dr. Dre and Kanye West were too busy to produce for the album at the time. He had hoped that the album would be out in 2011 after the two producers had completed their respective solo projects. In November, Doe or Die: 15th Anniversary was released to tide fans over until the arrival of Doe or Die II. In August 2011, AZ confirmed that Nas would be featured on the album.

In March 2012, AZ released the song "My Niggas" in promotion of the album, which features production from longtime collaborator Buckwild. AZ stated the same month that he was aiming for a Q3 2012 release date. He stated that he was still picking beats for the second half of the album and was seeking production from Eminem and DJ Premier.

In November 2015, AZ gave an update on the state of the album, saying, "I'm going into overdrive through the winter, and I guarantee no later than the first or second quarter of next year it'll be out. As for the producers, I'm trying to switch it up and add some new flavor. I'm gonna keep Buckwild, [DJ] Premier, and Pete Rock, but I have a lot of new producers to bring some new flavor to the table. It's so far, so good."

In September 2016, when asked about the album's delays, AZ stated, "The sonics [of hip-hop] are changing. Times is changing. I want to do this for myself at the end of the day, and for my core audience, just to put Doe or Die II out; I’ve been sayin' it for a while. [...] It's just the business behind it [that is causing the delays], and how I want to attack it. [...] It's samples, it's licensing, it's just getting the right distribution." He also suggested that Doe or Die II would be his final studio album and that he was planning on releasing something by the end of 2016.

In May 2020, AZ hinted that the album would be receiving a summer 2020 release date after releasing the single "Found My Niche". After several months, in December 2020, AZ released a follow-up single titled "Different" and stated that the album would be arriving in early 2021. The album's final track listing was unveiled on August 13, 2021.

== Singles ==
The album's first single, "Different", was released on December 4, 2020. On December 9, 2020, the music video was released for "Different". The album's second single, "The Wheel", was released on July 30, 2021. The song features guest vocals from American recording artist Jaheim and is produced by KayGee. On August 19, 2021, the music video was released for "The Wheel".

== Critical reception ==
Professional ratings
Review scores
Source	Rating
HipHopDX	3.8/5 stars
MicCheque	7/10
Pitchfork	7.3/10
RapReviews	7.5/10
SoulinStereo	4/5 stars

Doe or Die II received generally positive reviews from music critics. Grant Jones of RapReviews said, "Doe or Die II is a solid if unspectacular AZ album that has a bit of everything from his arsenal. A couple of tracks retain the Doe or Die style, a few have that smoother Aziatic feel and some songs capture that later ultra-slick aesthetic. Instead of being a literal sequel, it feels like a refresher course." Riley Wallace of HipHopDX said, "AZ's latest is what growing gracefully in Hip Hop looks and sounds like, sticking to his strengths without sounding out of touch, a lesson many other Golden Age rappers could take to heart. Pete Tosiello of Pitchfork stated, "Doe or Die II is a better record for it. The best sequels offer fresh lenses through which to consider their predecessors, and AZ's discography has a rare narrative trajectory. Where Doe or Die's narrator did the dirty work of pushing hostages' heads through plane propellers, its follow-ups find an older man idly enjoying the spoils of wealth, plotting political maneuvers, and reminiscing over the bad old days.

== Track listing ==
No.	Title	Producer	Length
1.	"Conversations with God" (featuring Idris Elba)	P Soul	1:51
2.	"Just 4 You"	Bink	3:29
3.	"The Wheel" (featuring Jaheim)	KayGee	3:17
4.	"Keep It Real"	Baby Paul	2:58
5.	"Never Enough" (featuring Rick Ross)	Baby Paul; Prime	3:36
6.	"Different"	Aone Beats	3:44
7.	"Ritual" (featuring Lil Wayne and Conway the Machine)	Alchemist	3:12
8.	"Blow That Sh#%t" (featuring Dave East)	Buckwild	4:14
9.	"Bulletproof"	Bink	3:56
10.	"Check Me Out"	Pete Rock	3:10
11.	"Time to Answer"	The Heatmakerz	3:00
12.	"Found My Niche"	The Czar-Keys	2:02
13.	"What's Good" (bonus track) (featuring T-Pain)	Rockwilder	3:45

Deluxe Edition bonus tracks
No.	Title	Producer	Length
14.	"Jewels for Life" (featuring Inky Johnson)	Bink	3:11
15.	"Motorola Era" (with 2 Chainz)	Statik Selektah	2:46
16.	"Stay Fly"	Bud'da	1:45
17.	"This Is Mine"	Statik Selektah	3:06

Notes

- "Check Me Out" features additional vocals from Pete Rock.
- "Never Enough" features additional vocals from Mara Kaye.

== Chart positions ==
Chart (2021)	Peak position
US Top Album Sales (Billboard)	60
