= Maimouna Youssef =

American singer, songwriter, and rapper

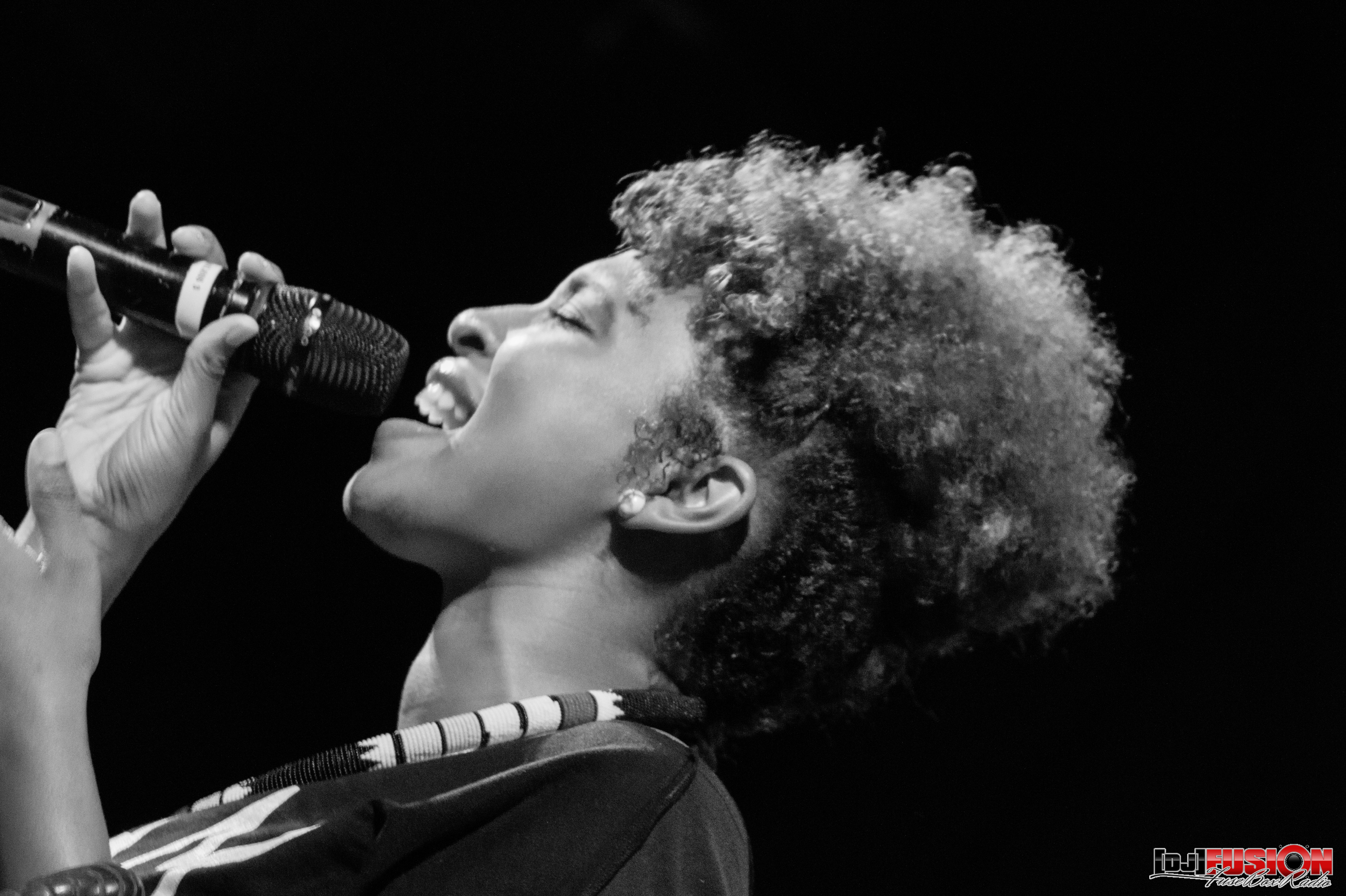
Maimouna Youssef singing at DC Loves Dilla in July 2014

Maimouna Youssef is an American singer, songwriter, and rapper. She is of Choctaw, Creek, Cherokee and African American heritage. She performs music under the stage name Mumu Fresh.

== Early life ==
Youssef was born in Baltimore, but moved to Philadelphia when she was about ten. She was partly home schooled by her theatrical parents who taught her how to handle an audience and a microphone. She went to the Duke Ellington School of the Arts when she was in her teens graduating in the class of 2002. She went on to the New York Film Academy, but she dropped out. She returned to Baltimore and went to live with her aunt.

== Musical career ==
Youssef earned a Grammy nomination for her vocal contribution to "Don't Feel Right" by the Roots in 2007. She performed in the 2007 hip-hop documentary film Dave Chappelle's Block Party. Youssef released an EP, Black Magic Woman, and a full album, The Blooming, in 2011. With DJ Dummy, she released the album Vintage Babies featuring Common, Irvin Washington, and Malik Yusef in 2017.

Youssef represented the Washington DC chapter of the Recording Academy at the 2015 GRAMMY Festival at Sea. She performed an NPR Tiny Desk concert with August Greene in February 2018, and her own set in July 2018.

On September 26, 2018, Youssef was the featured guest on What's Good with Stretch and Bobbito, an NPR podcast. She talks about her Native American heritage, culture, and family. She also shares how her mother, grandmother and brother affected her as a youngster and fledgling vocalist, including an anecdote that her mother knew she could sing by listening to her cry. Youssef relates her experiences navigating the music industry as a signed and as an independent artist.

In 2021, she was featured on Tech N9ne's album ASIN9NE alongside rapper Lil Wayne on the song "Too Good".
