= The Firm (hip-hop group) =

American hip hop supergroup

- Promotional shot of The Firm in 1997, left to right: Nas, Foxy Brown and AZ

Background information
- Origin: New York City, U.S.
- Genres: Hip hop
- Years active: 1996–1999; 2020
- Labels: Aftermath; Interscope
- Spinoff of: Trackmasters
- Past members: Nas; AZ; Foxy Brown; Cormega; Nature

The Firm was an American hip hop supergroup formed in New York City in 1996 by rapper Nas, his manager Steve Stoute, producer Dr. Dre and production team Trackmasters. The group is composed of East Coast-based rappers Nas, Foxy Brown, AZ and Cormega. Rapper Nature is a former member: he served as a replacement for Cormega after he was ousted from the group.

Although the group received initial hype and high expectations from fans upon their formation after collectively signing to Dr. Dre's Aftermath label, The Firm's debut album, The Album (1997), generated disappointing sales and generally negative criticism. The album, which featured predominant mafioso rap-themes and production from Dr. Dre and the Trackmasters, was criticized for its pop-orientation. Their debut album was the group's only release and they disbanded in 1999 with each member continuing their solo careers.

The members (including Cormega, who had made up with Nas after their falling-out, and excluding Nature) reunited on Nas' 2020 album King's Disease on the track "Full Circle". Dr. Dre has outro vocals on the song.

== Background ==
The Firm's origins lie in the recording of Nas' studio album It Was Written (1996), which included a collaboration on the song "Affirmative Action" with East Coast-based rappers AZ, Cormega, and Foxy Brown. The supergroup was a project created by rapper Nas, his manager Steve Stoute, West Coast-based rapper and producer Dr. Dre, and production team the Trackmasters. The resulting lineup included Nas, Brown, AZ and rapper Nature. Cormega had been ousted from the group and was replaced by Nature prior to recording The Firm's debut, due to artistic differences between him and Nas, as well as contract disagreements with Nas's manager Steve Stoute. According to Poke & Tone, 50 Cent and Mary J. Blige were tentatively considered for the group.

Prior to their formation, the members were at transitional stages of their careers, as Nas had commercialized his musical style with his second album, Foxy Brown had earned her first recording contract, AZ had gained critical acclaim for his 1995 debut album Doe or Die (1995), and Cormega had chosen to continue his rapping career after his release from prison in 1995. The project also served as an attempt by Dr. Dre to focus on producing other artists work rather than his solo work, following his departure from Death Row Records and the formation of his Aftermath label, which the group was collectively signed to. After the announcement of the group's formation by Dr. Dre, all involved with the project hyped it heavily, creating considerable buzz.

== The Album ==
The group's only studio album, The Album (1997) was a concept album that revolved around mafioso rap themes, and featured production work from Dr. Dre and the Trackmasters. Two singles were released from the album, "Firm Biz", which features singer Dawn Robinson, and "Phone Tap". While anticipated with much hype, The Album received generally negative reviews and generated disappointing sales upon its release.

Despite the group's excessive hype and its mainstream musical approach, The Firm did not meet the expectations of fans who were introduced to the group via It Was Written, and The Album was criticized by music writers for abandoning hip hop for R&B and pop style. Nas appeared to be seeking pop stardom.

== Aftermath ==
The Firm disbanded the following year and its members continued their solo careers. Nas' and Dr. Dre's participation in the group furthered speculation by fans and critics that the two artists were losing their creativity and appeal. Their work during this period has since been considered the weakest and least successful of their careers.

The replacing of Cormega with rapper Nature strained his friendship with Nas. Cormega, who continued to resent being ousted from the group, released the white label "Fuck Nas & Nature", circulating it through the mixtape market. Nature retaliated through a verse contribution on a DJ Clue mixtape. The two have since ended their beef and have recorded and performed together. After a short-lived truce, Nas attacked Cormega on the diss track "Destroy & Rebuild" from his fifth studio album Stillmatic (2001).

In December 2006, Cormega, Foxy Brown and Nas reunited to perform "Affirmative Action" live on-stage, ending the beef between Cormega and Nas. A reunion was unconfirmed. In an August 2010 interview with MTV, Foxy Brown explained there have been recent discussions on a Firm reformation, dependent on the remaining four agreeing to it.

== Reunion ==
In August 2020, the group (including Cormega but excluding Nature) reunited for the song "Full Circle" from Nas' album King's Disease.

== Discography ==
=== Studio albums ===
Title	Album details	Peak chart positions			Certifications
Title	Album details	US	US R&B	CAN	Certifications
The Album	Released: October 21, 1997; Label: Aftermath; Interscope; Format: CD, LP, cassette, MD	1	1	8	MC: Gold

== Bibliography ==
- John Borgmeyer; Holly Lang (2006). Dr. Dre: A Biography. Edition: illustrated. Greenwood Publishing Group. ISBN 0-313-33826-4.
- Jake Brown (2006). Dr. Dre in the Studio. Edition: illustrated. Amber Books Publishing. ISBN 0-9767735-5-4.
- Sacha Jenkins; Elliott Wilson; Gabe Alvarez; Brent Rollins (1999). Ego Trip's Book of Rap Lists: Book of Rap Lists. Edition: illustrated. Macmillan. ISBN 0-312-24298-0.
- Mickey Hess (2007). Icons of Hip Hop: An Encyclopedia of the Movement, Music, and Culture. Edition: illustrated. Greenwood Publishing Group. ISBN 978-0-313-33904-2.
- Todd Boyd (2004). The New H.N.I.C.: The Death of Civil Rights and the Reign of Hip Hop. NYU Press. ISBN 0-8147-9896-9.
