= Nature (rapper) =

American rapper (born 1973)

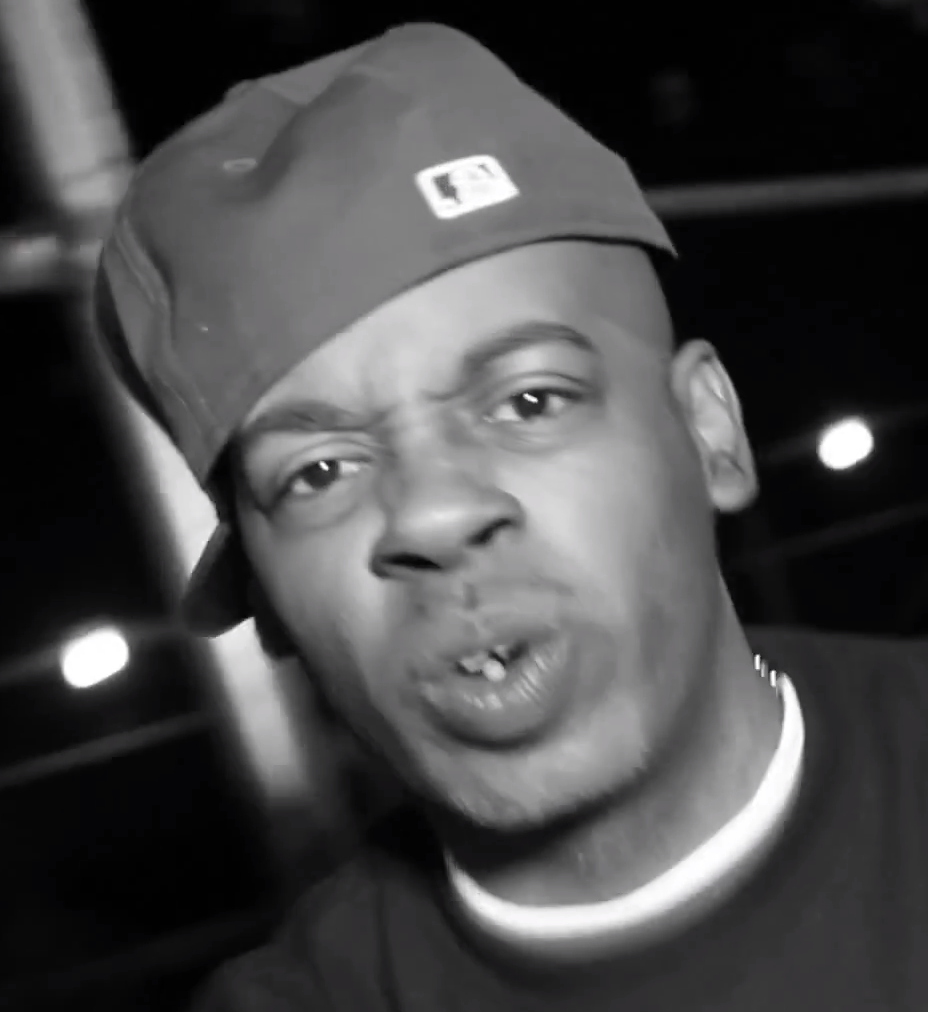
- Nature in 2015

Background information
- Born: Jermain Baxter; December 5, 1973 (age 52); Long Island, New York, U.S.
- Origin: Queens, New York City, U.S.
- Genres: Hip hop
- Years active: 1994–present
- Labels: Sony; Columbia; Track Masters
- Formerly of: The Firm

Jermain Baxter (born December 5, 1973), known professionally as Nature, is an American rapper, best known for his association with fellow New York City rapper Nas and having replaced Cormega in the original QB group the Firm.

== Career ==
Baxter grew up in Queensbridge, New York, and went to school with Nas. Nas introduced Nature to the public in 1997, as a member of his supergroup The Firm, whose members also included AZ and Foxy Brown. Nature was brought in to replace rapper Cormega, who had a contractual dispute with Nas' manager Steve Stoute and a subsequent fallout with Nas. The Firm's only album, Nas, Foxy Brown, AZ, and Nature Present The Firm: The Album, topped the Billboard 200 album chart. The album featured production from music production team Trackmasters.

The Firm disbanded in 1997 to pursue various solo projects. In 1998, Nature was featured on Noreaga's single "Banned from T.V.", alongside Big Pun, Cam'ron, Jadakiss and Styles P. After The Firm's dissolution, Nature was signed to Trackmasters' namesake record label. At the end of the year, Nature appeared on DJ Clue?'s December 1998 debut album, The Professional, on the song Exclusive-New Shit. After several delays, Nature's debut album For All Seasons, was released in 2000 by Columbia Records and Trackmasters Records and featured a guest appearance from Nas. It reached number 50 on the Billboard 200. Nature also contributed an original freestyle that appeared on the fictional Game FM radio station for Rockstar Games' 2001 video game Grand Theft Auto III. He followed his debut in 2002 with Wild Gremlinz, released on independent Sequence Records, which reached number 150 on the Billboard 200 but reached number 9 on the Independent Albums chart. Three of his tracks were included on the soundtrack of the film Angels in America in 2003. A third album, Pain Killer, was released in 2008 with production largely handled by Scram Jones, Dub Sonata & Mes. Nature released a series of EP's titled Seasons Changed in 2013-2014 under DCM.

== Discography ==
=== Studio albums ===
- For All Seasons (2000)
- Wild Gremlinz (2002)
- Pain Killer (2008)
- Target Practice (2016)

=== Collaborative albums ===
- The Firm: The Album (with The Firm) (1997)

=== Compilation albums ===
- Seasons Changed (2015)
- Queens Classics (2016)
- Queens Classics 2 (2017)

=== Mixtapes ===
- The Nature Files: The Best of Nature Vol.1 (2007)
- The Lost Tapes Volume 1 (2008)
- The Ashtray Effect (2013)
- The Ashtray Effect Vol.2 (2015)
- The Ashtray Effect Vol.3 (2015)

=== Extended plays ===
- Seasons Changed: Spring Edition (2013)
- Seasons Changed: Summer Edition (2013)
- Seasons Changed: Fall Edition (2013)
- Seasons Changed: Winter Edition (2014)

=== Guest Features ===
Year	Artist	Song	Album
1998	Sparkle, Cam'ron	Good Life	Sparkle
1998	DJ Clue	Exclusive New Shit	The Professional
1998	Noreaga	Hed	N.O.R.E.
1999	Xzibit, Reptile, Ja Rule, Juvenile	25 to Life	Life (soundtrack)
1999	Nas	In Too Deep	In Too Deep (soundtrack)
1999	The Madd Rapper, Black Rob	They Just Don't Know	Tell Em Why U Madd
2000	Ali Vegas	It's Like That	Generation Gap
2000	Half-a-Mil	Ridin'	Milion
2000	---	Fire	Nas & Ill Will Present QB's Finest
2000	Screwball	The Blocks	Y2K the Album
2002	Heather B	More Than the Music	Eternal Affairs
2004	DJ KaySlay, N.O.R.E, Left Gunz & Jaheim	No Problems	The Streetsweeper, Vol. 2
2004	N.O.R.E.	4 a MInute	Oye Mi Canto 12"
