= Doe or Die =

Studio album by AZ
- Released: October 10, 1995
- Recorded: 1994–1995
- Genre: East Coast hip-hop; mafioso rap
- Length: 45:24
- Label: EMI
- Producer: AZ (exec.); Lindsey Williams (exec.); Damian "Deo" Blyden (exec.); Pete Rock; Loose; Buckwild; L.E.S.; DR Period; Amar Pep; N.O. Joe; Ski; Lunatic Mind

AZ chronology
| Doe or Die (1995) | The Album (1997) |

Singles from Doe or Die
- 1. "Sugar Hill" Released: June 27, 1995

Doe or Die is the debut studio album by rapper AZ, released October 10, 1995, by EMI Records. The album features guest appearances by artists such as Nas and Miss Jones, and production from N.O. Joe, Pete Rock, L.E.S., and Buckwild, among others. The album spawned the single "Sugar Hill" - which was certified gold by the RIAA in 1995.

Upon release, Doe or Die achieved notable critical and commercial success. The album peaked at No. 15 on the Billboard 200, and No. 1 on the U.S. Top R&B/Hip Hop Albums chart. Doe or Die produced several singles, including, "Mo Money, Mo Murder," "Gimme Yours (remix)," "Doe or Die" and "Sugar Hill" - which was certified Gold by the RIAA in 1995. The album went on to sell over a million copies A sequel, Doe or Die II, was released on September 10, 2021.

== Content ==
The album incorporates fictitious tales chronicling the underworld lifestyle of organized crime. These cinematic narratives often depict a mobster's ascent to fame and wealth. Further emphasizing these themes, the cover of Doe or Die portrays AZ as an honoree of an elaborate mob funeral. Within the cover, a portrait of AZ is surrounded by flowers, while the body of the rapper is buried in a casket that contains large amounts of dollars. In addition, the liner notes and the back of the album features images of AZ counting money, drinking expensive wine, and smoking cigars.

== Reception ==
Professional ratings
Review scores
| Source | Rating |
|---|---|
| AllMusic | 4.5/5 stars |
| Los Angeles Times | 3/4 stars |
| The New Rolling Stone Album Guide | 3/5 stars |
| RapReviews | 8.5/10 |
| The Source | 4/5 stars |
| Spin | 7/10 |

Upon its release, Doe or Die received generally favorable reviews from most music critics. Stanton Swihart from AllMusic compared certain aspects of it to Nas' debut album Illmatic, stating "The two albums are very much the twin sides of the same double-headed coin. They are so closely connected, in fact, that it's difficult to pinpoint where Doe or Die's points of departure are located." He viewed it as "one of the strongest, most promising debut efforts of 1995" and one of the strongest rap albums of the year. Christian Hoard from Rolling Stone called it a "literate, sensitive look at street life that sits comfortably, as a companion, next to Nas' masterpiece (Illmatic)." Selwyn Seyfu Hinds from Spin noted the well-defined structure of the album, comparing AZ's delivery to Kool G Rap's.

Although praising the album's lyricism, Los Angeles Times writer Cheo H. Coker criticized the album's production, describing some of it as "lackluster beats". In a retrospective review, a critic for RapReviews labeled Doe or Die as "AZ's best album to date", with the "most replay value". The reviewer believed it deserves to be mentioned alongside albums such as Only Built 4 Cuban Linx..., It Was Written, and Reasonable Doubt for popularizing the Mafioso style rap, highlighting the fact, that Doe or Die preceded two of them. Simultaneously, he criticized some of the album's production and its lack of consistency. He ended the review, saying "All in all, this album is slept on and should be viewed as a gem that must be in every true head's collection".

== Track listing ==
| # | Title | Performer(s) | Producer(s) | Time |
|---|---|---|---|---|
| 1 | "Intro" | AZ, Nas | AZ, Lunatic Mind | 1:18 |
| 2 | "Uncut Raw" | AZ | Loose | 2:59 |
| 3 | "Gimme Yours" | Intro/chorus: Nas; Verses: AZ | Pete Rock | 3:07 |
| 4 | "Ho Happy Jackie" | AZ | Buckwild | 3:34 |
| 5 | "Rather Unique" | AZ | Pete Rock | 4:49 |
| 6 | "I Feel for You" | Verses: AZ; Backing vocals: Erica Scott | Amar Pep | 3:03 |
| 7 | "Sugar Hill" | Verses: AZ; Chorus/backing vocals: Miss Jones | L.E.S. | 4:09 |
| 8 | "Mo Money, Mo Murder" | AZ, Nas | DR Period, Outro: Lunatic Mind | 6:32 |
| 9 | "Doe or Die" | AZ | N.O. Joe | 4:39 |
| 10 | "We Can't Win" | Intro/Outro: Daddy Rose (Black Rose Cartel/Rose Family (Populayshun Click)); First verse: Amar Pep; Second verse/hook: Barsham; Third verse: AZ | Amar Pep | 3:23 |
| 11 | "Your World Don't Stop" | AZ | Ski | 3:33 |
| 12 | "Sugar Hill (Remix)" | AZ | L.E.S. | 4:18 |

== Personnel ==
- AZ - performer
- Nas - performer
- Daddy Rose (El Shabar) performer
- Amar Pep - producer, performer
- Buck Wild - producer
- Void Caprio - engineer
- D/R Period - producer
- John Gamble - engineer
- Jack Hersca - engineer
- John Kogan - engineer
- L.E.S. - producer
- Lunatic Mind - producer
- Henry Marquez - art direction
- N.O. Joe - arranger, producer
- Joe Pirrera - engineer
- Pete Rock - producer
- Erica Scott - vocals
- Ski - remixing
- Jamey Staub - engineer
- Jason Vogel - engineer
- Lindsey Williams - executive producer
- Miss Jones - vocals
- Barsham - performer
- Spunk Biggs - producer
- Lunatic mind - producer
- Loose - producer

== Album singles ==
- "Sugar Hill"
  - Released: June 27, 1995
  - B-side: "Rather Unique"
- "Gimme Yours (Remix)" [Non-album single]
  - Released: December 5, 1995
  - B-side: "Uncut Raw"
- "Doe or Die"
  - Released: April 2, 1996
  - B-side: "Mo Money, Mo Murder (Homicide)"

== Charts ==
| Chart (1995) | Peak position |
|---|---|
| US Billboard 200 | 15 |
| US Top R&B/Hip Hop Albums | 1 |

Singles

| Year | Song | Chart positions | | | | |
| Year | Song | US Hot 100 | US R&B | US Rap | US Rhythm | US Dance Sales |
|---|---|---|---|---|---|---|
| 1995 | "Gimme Yours" | 115 | 51 | 30 | — | 21 |
| 1995 | "Sugar Hill" | 25 | 12 | 3 | 28 | 4 |
| 1995 | "Doe or Die" | — | 69 | 24 | — | 28 |

== Doe or Die: 15th Anniversary ==
A 15th anniversary edition of Doe or Die was released on November 30, 2010, by AZ's own Quiet Money Records. Doe or Die: 15th Anniversary features production from Frank Dukes, Dave Moss, Statik Selektah, Baby Paul, Lil' Fame from M.O.P., and Roctimus Prime. The album also features vocals from R&B singer June Summers. All the songs from the original Doe or Die are remixed with a new beat.

== See also ==
- List of number-one R&B albums of 1995 (U.S.)
