= Half a Mill =

American rapper (1973–2003)

Background information
- Born: Jasun Wardlaw; April 6, 1973; Brooklyn, New York City, U.S.
- Died: October 22, 2003 (aged 30) Brooklyn, New York City, U.S.
- Genres: Hip-hop
- Occupation: Rapper
- Instrument: Vocals
- Years active: 1992–2003
- Labels: Penalty; Warlock; Lo-Key

Jasun Wardlaw (April 6, 1973 – October 22, 2003) better known by his stage name Half a Mill, was a Brooklyn-based American rapper.

== Career ==
Half a Mill was considered an underground rapper in the early 1990s. His mainstream breakthrough came in 1997 when he scored a guest spot on supergroup the Firm's only release, The Album.

== Personal life and death ==
Wardlaw died by suicide by shooting himself in the head in Brooklyn's Albany Projects on October 22, 2003. His body was found by police inside his apartment. He left behind a son, Jasun Jabbar Wardlaw Jr., who is a rapper and actor.

Half a Mill was the subject of the 2010 full-length documentary Player Hating: A Love Story by filmmaker Maggie Hadleigh-West.

== Discography ==
Album information
Half-A-Mill Demo Tape (with DJ Scratch)
- Released: 1995
- Singles: "Any Day Can Be Ya Last"/"Another Homicide Scene"
Milíon
- Released: May 9, 2000
- RIAA Certification: 40,000
- Billboard 200 chart position:
- R&B/Hip-Hop chart position: 91
- Singles: "Some Ni*gaz", "Thug Onez", "Where BK At"
Da Hustle Don't Stop
- Released: July 30, 2002
- RIAA Certification:
- Billboard 200 chart position:
- R&B/Hip-Hop chart position:
- Singles: "Still", "Soddom and Gomorrah", "Saprano Style"
