= AZ (rapper) =

American rapper (born 1972)

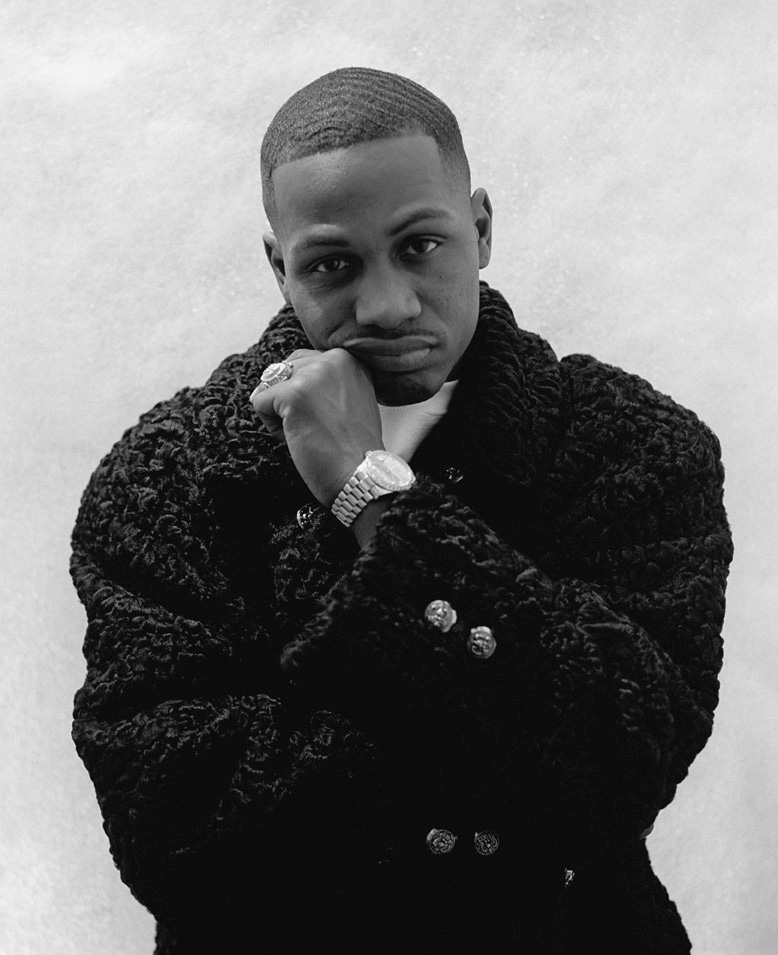
- AZ in 1998

Background information
- Also known as: AZ the Visualiza; Sosa; The Rap James Bond
- Born: Anthony Cruz; March 9, 1972 (age 54); Brooklyn, New York City, U.S.
- Genres: East Coast hip-hop; mafioso rap
- Occupations: Rapper; songwriter
- Works: AZ discography
- Years active: 1992–present
- Labels: Quiet Money; Real Talk; Koch; Noo Trybe; Virgin; EMI
- Formerly of: The Firm

Anthony Cruz (born March 9, 1972), better known by his stage name AZ, is an American rapper. Best known for his work with fellow East Coast rapper Nas, the two formed the New York City-based hip hop group the Firm in 1996, along with Foxy Brown, Cormega and Nature.

Cruz most notably guest appeared on Nas' 1994 single "Life's a Bitch," and signed with EMI to release his debut studio album, Doe or Die (1995), which was met with critical acclaim. Its lead single, "Sugar Hill" (featuring Miss Jones) peaked at number 25 on the Billboard Hot 100 and received gold certification by the Recording Industry Association of America (RIAA). Moreover, The Firm's sole album (1997) peaked atop the Billboard 200 chart despite unfavorable critical response; the group disbanded two years later.

Upon EMI's dissolution, he was transferred to its sister labels, Noo Trybe Records and Virgin Records, through which he released his second album, Pieces of a Man (1998), to continued acclaim. Afterward, Cruz signed with Motown and Universal Records to release his third and fourth albums, 9 Lives (2001) and Aziatic (2002). The latter contained the song "The Essence" (featuring Nas), which earned a nomination for Best Rap Performance by a Duo or Group at the 45th Annual Grammy Awards.

Online magazine About.com listed AZ as the "Most Underrated [Rapper] of All Time". AZ also made it onto the site's "Top 50 MCs of Our Time (1987–2007)", where he was named "arguably the most underrated lyricist ever".

== Early life ==
AZ was born in Bedford–Stuyvesant, Brooklyn to an African-American mother and a Dominican father. He grew up in East New York, Brooklyn, with his mother and sister.

AZ started writing rap lyrics when he was 12 years old. He attended Eli Whitney High School, with fellow Brooklyn rapper Jay-Z, until the vocational school closed down in the late 1980s. In the early 1990s, he became friends with Nas, a young rapper from Queens. Nas started working on his debut album Illmatic and invited AZ to work with him in the studio. AZ appeared on the album intro and had a verse on "Life's a Bitch". After Illmatic was released in 1994, EMI Records offered AZ a record deal.

== Career ==
=== 1995–2001: Doe or Die, Pieces of a Man and 9 Lives ===
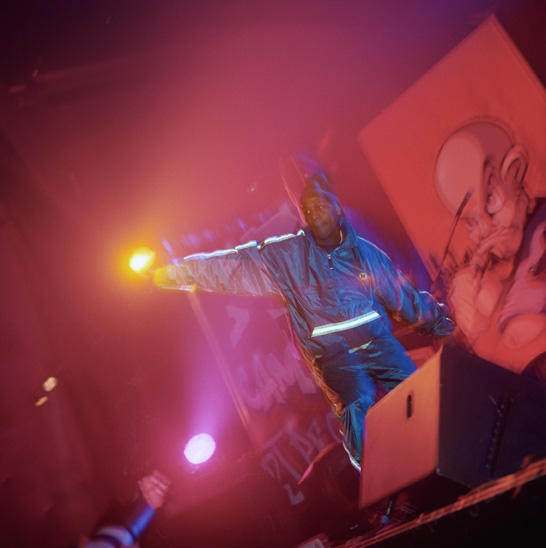
AZ performing in 1997

AZ's debut album Doe or Die was released by EMI Records on October 10, 1995. It features guest appearances by Nas and production from N.O. Joe, Pete Rock, L.E.S., and Buckwild, among others. Doe or Die was known for popularizing the theme of mafioso rap, alongside several albums, namely Jay-Z's Reasonable Doubt and Nas's It Was Written. Doe or Die produced several singles, including "Mo Money, Mo Murder", "Gimme Yours", "Doe or Die" and "Sugar Hill", the last of which became his highest-charting single domestically and his sole Top 40 hit on the Billboard Hot 100, being certified Gold by the RIAA in September 1995.

In 1998, Pieces of a Man, AZ's second album, was released via Noo Trybe Records. His third album, 2001's 9 Lives, was released via Motown, peaking at No. 58 on the Billboard 200.

=== 2002–2007: Aziatic, A.W.O.L. and The Format ===
AZ's fourth album Aziatic features a duet between AZ and long-time friend and collaborator, Nas, "The Essence", which was nominated for a Grammy Award for Best Rap Performance by a Duo or Group. The album was mostly well received by critics, one such positive review from Brad Mills at Allmusic, states: "AZ has been looked upon to do amazing things with his music. Has he lived up to those high expectations on this album he has from start to finish. The beats on this album are complex, inventive, and almost perfectly suited for AZ's style of rhyming. He's carefully crafted this album rather than slapped it together overnight to meet his quota, and it shows. It helps immensely that he's brought along people like DR Period, Az Izz, Nas, and Buckwild, but they don't outshine the younger AZ as he holds his own well. AZ has come up with his best work in a long time on this album."

On September 6, 2005, A.W.O.L., his fifth album, was released, becoming the first AZ album to be released on his own imprint, Quiet Money Records.

AZ's sixth studio album The Format features production from Lil' Fame of M.O.P., Face Defeat, Emile, J. Cardim, Phonte, Statik Selektah and DJ Premier. The album's lead single is its title track "The Format", which was produced by DJ Premier, with "Vendetta" as its B-Side. The Format also features the bonus track "Royal Salute", a retaliation to 50 Cent's song "What If" which included a line aimed at AZ. On October 7, 2007, Quiet Money released The Format (Special Edition), adding six bonus tracks including "Royal Salute".

=== 2008–present: Undeniable, Legendary, Doe or Die II and Truth Be Told ===
Undeniable, his seventh studio album, was released on April 1, 2008, through Quiet Money and Koch Records. The album debuted at number 141 on the U.S. Billboard 200 chart, selling over 25,000 copies in its first week. In October 2009, AZ confirmed he was working on a sequel to his debut studio album, titled Doe or Die 2. He hoped to enlist the original production team from Doe or Die such as L.E.S., Pete Rock, DR Period, and Buckwild. AZ also had ambitions on trying to acquire beats from DJ Toomp, Dr. Dre and Kanye West for the album, as well as reaching out to his old rhyme partner Nas. The first single from the album "Feel My Pain" was produced by Frank Dukes.

In 2010, former member of Da Beatminerz, Baby Paul confirmed he would be producing for the album and serving as executive producer. On November 30, 2010, he released a 15th anniversary edition of Doe or Die titled Doe or Die: 15th Anniversary. In 2010, Dr. Dre and Kanye West were said to be too busy to produce for the album, but AZ said he was patiently waiting for them to complete their next solo records so they could join the production team. He was also seeking production from DJ Premier. During a 2011 interview with XXLMag, AZ confirmed that Nas would be featured on the album.

On March 27, 2012, AZ released the first street single from Doe or Die 2, "My Niggas", which features production from longtime collaborator Buckwild. The album's production includes tracks from Statik Selektah, Baby Paul and the original Doe or Die team of beatsmiths L.E.S., DR Period, Pete Rock, and Buckwild.

In 2014, AZ was heavily featured on Ghostface Killah's album 36 Seasons.

After several delays, Doe or Die II was released on September 10, 2021.

On December 1, 2023, AZ released his tenth studio album Truth Be Told via Quiet Money Records. The album was entirely produced by Buckwild and included the singles "The GOAT", "This is Why", "How We Get It", and "Respect Mines".

=== 2025–present: Doe or Die III ===
In April 2026, it was announced that AZ would release the third installment in his Doe or Die series, Doe or Die III, in partnership with Mass Appeal Records. The announcement was accompanied by the release of the album's lead single, "So High", featuring Mumu Fresh, on April 10, 2026.

Doe or Die III was officially released on May 8, 2026, via AZ's Quiet Money Records and Nas' Mass Appeal Records. The 13-track album features guest appearances from frequent collaborator Nas, as well as Jadakiss, Mumu Fresh, and the debut of AZ's son Amar Noir. Production on the project was handled by a variety of prominent hip-hop producers, including Large Professor, Statik Selektah, Buckwild, Bink, Mike & Keys, K-Def, and Ron Browz.

== Discography ==
Studio albums

- Doe or Die (1995)
- Pieces of a Man (1998)
- 9 Lives (2001)
- Aziatic (2002)
- A.W.O.L. (2005)
- The Format (2006)
- Undeniable (2008)
- Legendary (2009)
- Doe or Die II (2021)
- Truth Be Told (2023)
- Doe or Die III (2026)

Collaboration albums

- The Firm: The Album (1997)

== Awards and nominations ==
Grammy Awards

Year	Award	Nomination	Result
2003	Best Rap Performance by a Duo or Group	"The Essence" (with Nas)	Nominated

== See also ==
- List of Afro-Latinos
