= Shyne discography =

Discography

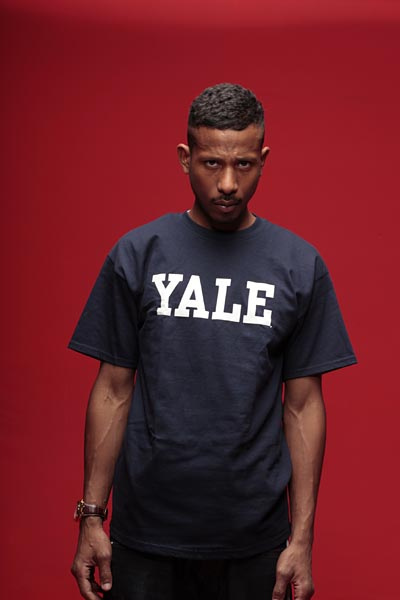
- Shyne in 2010
- Studio albums: 2
- Singles: 6
- Mixtapes: 2

This is the discography of Shyne, a Belizean rapper.

== Albums ==
=== Studio albums ===
List of albums, with selected chart positions and certifications
Title	Album details	Peak chart positions			Certifications
Title	Album details	US	US R&B	UK	Certifications
Shyne	Released: September 26, 2000; Label: Bad Boy/Arista/BMG; Format: CD, LP, cassette, digital download	5	2	—	RIAA: Gold
Godfather Buried Alive	Released: August 10, 2004; Label: Gangland, Def Jam/IDJMG/Universal; Format: CD, LP, cassette, digital download	3	1	93	RIAA: Gold

=== Mixtapes ===
- Clinton Sparks & DJ Rukiz: Shyne - If I Could Start from Scratch (2004)
- Gangland (2012)

=== Unofficial Mixtapes ===
- The Truth: Advance (2001)
- Lost Sons (2003)
- Life After the Club (2004)
- Lost Tapes (2004)
- DJ Laser Presents Shyne - The Son of Sam (2009)
- 25 to Life Plus 9 (2009)
- Suge White & Shyne - Best of Shyne (2009)
- DJ Messiah & DJ Antalive: Shyne 10 Years & Still Shyne'in (2009)
- Welcome Home (Best of Shyne) (2009)
- Shyne's Home (Oct. 6) (2009)
- DJ Dizzy Donmez Hip-Hop Nights Shyne On (2010)
- The Shyning (2010)

== Singles ==
List of singles, with selected chart positions, showing year released and album name
Title	Year	Peak chart positions			Album
Title	Year	US	US R&B	US Rap	Album
"Bad Boyz" (featuring Barrington Levy)	2000	57	9	11	Shyne
"That's Gangsta"	2000	—	58	28	Shyne
"Bonnie & Shyne" (featuring Barrington Levy)	2001	—	57	—	Shyne
"More or Less" (featuring Foxy Brown)	2004	—	92	—	Godfather Buried Alive
"Jimmy Choo" (featuring Ashanti)	2004	—	55	—	Godfather Buried Alive
"Messiah"	2010	—	—	—	—N/a
"—" denotes a recording that did not chart.

== Guest appearances ==
Year	Song	Artist(s)	Album
1998	"Sittin' Home (Remix)"	Total	12"
1999	"From Scratch"	Mase, Harlem World, Mysonne	Double Up
1999	"Reverse"	Puff Daddy, Busta Rhymes, Cee-Lo, G-Dep, Redman, Sauce Money	Forever
1999	"P.E. 2000 (Remix)"	Puff Daddy	12"
1999	"Anywhere (Remix)"	112, Lil' Zane, Dru Hill	Young World: The Future
2000	"I Wish (Remix)"	Carl Thomas, Prodigy	12"
2000	"Bad"	Funkmaster Flex	The Mix Tape, Vol. 4: 60 Minutes of Funk
2001	"Can't Believe (Emotional Remix)"	Carl Thomas, Faith Evans	12"
2001	"Keep It Gangsta"	G. Dep	Child of the Ghetto
2001	"It's Over Now (Remix)"	112	Part III
2002	"Shyne"	Swizz Beatz, Mashonda	Swizz Beatz Presents G.H.E.T.T.O. Stories
2004	"Confessions Part II (Remix)"	Usher, Twista, Kanye West	Confessions (Special Edition)
2004	"I Changed My Mind (Remix)"	Keyshia Cole	—N/a
2011	"Outro"	Lil Wayne, Bun B, Nas, Busta Rhymes	Tha Carter IV
2012	"They Don't Want None"	Game, Pharrell Williams	California Republic
2012	"Bridges"	Naftali Kalfa, Yosi Piamenta	—N/a
2012	"Buffalo Soldier" & "King Crown of Judah"	Matisyahu	Spark Seeker
2014	"Ridin Round"	Red Cafe	American Psycho II
