= The Source Presents: Hip Hop Hits, Vol. 4 =

Compilation album by Various artists
- Released: December 12, 2000
- Recorded: 1999–2000
- Genres: Hip hop; gangsta rap
- Length: 1:11:19
- Label: Def Jam Recordings
- Producers: David Mays (exec.); Raymond Scott (exec.); Black Mob Group; Carlos Stephens; Darren "Limitless" Henson; DJ Paul; Dr. Dre; Erick Sermon; Ez Elpee; Hangmen 3; Jay Dee; Jay E; Jermaine Dupri; Juicy J; Kovas; LL Cool J; Mannie Fresh; Maseo; Mel-Man; Prince Paul; Rockwilder; Swizz Beatz; Younglord

The Source chronology
The Source Hip Hop Music Awards 2000 (2000)	The Source Presents: Hip Hop Hits, Vol. 4 (2000)	The Source Hip Hop Music Awards 2001 (2001)

Professional ratings
Review scores
Source	Rating
AllMusic	3/5 stars

The Source Presents: Hip Hop Hits, Volume 4 is the fourth annual music compilation album to be contributed by The Source magazine. Released December 12, 2000 and distributed by Def Jam Recordings, Hip Hop Hits Volume 4 features seventeen hip hop and rap hits. It went to number 35 on the Top R&B/Hip Hop Albums chart and peaked at number 43 on the Billboard 200 album chart. The compilation is tagged as the "Special 2000 Millennium Edition" (according to the artwork album cover).

This album is the third in the Hip Hop Hits series not to feature an R&B/Hip Hop or a pop hit in the number-one position, but two songs were number-one Hot Rap Tracks hits: "Country Grammar" and "Wobble Wobble". Volume 4 is the first to feature rapper Benzino at the time he became the controversial co-owner of The Source.

== Track listing ==
Credits adapted from Discogs.

No.	Title	Artist	Writer(s)	Producer(s)	Time
1	"Country Grammar (Hot Shit)"	Nelly	Cornell Haynes, Jr.; Jason Epperson	Jay E	4:46
2	"The Light"	Common	Lonnie Lynn; James Yancey; Bobby Caldwell; Ramel Werner; Norman Harris; Bruce Malament	Jay Dee	4:21
3	"Party Up (Up in Here)"	DMX	Earl Simmons; Kasseem Dean	Swizz Beatz	4:28
4	"Wobble Wobble"	504 Boyz	Percy Miller; Corey Miller; Vyshonn Miller; McKinley Phipps; Awood Johnson; Michael Tyler; Michael Wilson	Carlos Stephens	3:34
5	"Bad Boyz"	Shyne feat. Barrington Levy	Jamal Barrow; L.J. Porter; Barrington Levy; David Bowie; Jim Osterberg	Ez Elpee	4:34
6	"The Next Episode"	Dr. Dre feat. Snoop Dogg	Andre Young; Calvin Broadus; Melvin Bradford; Brian Bailey	Dr. Dre; Mel-Man	2:41
7	"It's So Hard"	Big Punisher feat. Donell Jones	Richard Frierson; J. Garfield; Christopher Rios	Younglord	3:30
8	"Shut Up"	Trick Daddy feat. Duece Poppito of 24 Karatz, Trina and Co of Tre +6	Maurice Young; Lasana Smith; Katrina Taylor; Corey Evans	Black Mob Group	4:22
9	"Imagine That"	LL Cool J	James Todd Smith	Rockwilder; LL Cool J	4:56
10	"The Real Slim Shady"	Eminem	Marshall Mathers; Young; Tommy Coster; Mike Elizondo	Dr. Dre; Mel-Man	4:44
11	"#1 Stunna"	Big Tymers	Bryan Williams; Byron Thomas; Dwayne Carter; Terius Gray	Mannie Fresh	4:41
12	"Oooh."	De La Soul feat. Redman	Kelvin Mercer; David Jude Jolicoeur; Vincent Mason; Reggie Noble	Prince Paul; Kovas; Maseo	3:33
13	"Holla Back (Holla Boston)"	Made Men		Hangmen 3	4:52
14	"Sippin' on Some Syrup"	Project Pat feat. Three 6 Mafia and UGK	Paul Beauregard; Chad Butler; Bernard Freeman; Jordan Houston	DJ Paul; Juicy J	4:24
15	"No Matter What They Say"	Lil' Kim	Kimberly Jones; Bernard Edwards; Bobby Byrd; Catalino Curet Alonso; Charles Bobbit; Darren Henson; Dennis Taylor; Edward Archer; Eric Barrier; Howard Thompson; Jack Hill; James Brown; Nile Rodgers; Peter Joyner; Robert Beavers; William Griffin	Darren "Limitless" Henson	4:17
16	"Y.O.U."	Method Man & Redman	Clifford Smith; Reginald Noble; Erick Sermon	Erick Sermon	3:55
17	"What'chu Like"	Da Brat feat. Tyrese	Shawntae Harris; Jermaine Dupri	Jermaine Dupri	3:41

== Charts ==
Weekly chart performance for The Source Presents: Hip Hop Hits, Vol. 4
Chart (2000)	Peak position
US Billboard 200	43
US Top R&B/Hip-Hop Albums (Billboard)	35
