= Music Inspired by Scarface =

Compilation album by various artists
- Released: September 16, 2003
- Recorded: Various
- Genres: Gangsta rap, hardcore hip hop, mafioso rap, East Coast hip hop
- Label: Def Jam

Singles from Scarface
- 1. "G.O.D. Pt. III" Released: July 2, 1997; 2. "It's Mine" Released: August 31, 1999

Music Inspired by Scarface is a compilation album released in 2003. It features songs by various hip-hop artists which either draw direct inspiration from the 1983 film Scarface or contain subject matter that can relate to the film.

== Track listing ==
#	Artist	Title	Producer	Featured Guest
1		Introduccion		
2	Mobb Deep	It's Mine	Mobb Deep	Nas
3	Cam'ron	Yeo	Charlemagne	
4		Don't Get High On Your Own Supply (Interlude)		
5	Notorious B.I.G.	Ten Crack Commandments	DJ Premier	
6	Scarface	Mr. Scarface	Doug King & Bido	
7	Jay-Z	Streets Is Watching	Ski	
8		The Deal (Interlude)		
9	N.W.A.	Dope Man	Dr. Dre & DJ Yella	
10		You Wanna Go To War? (Interlude)		
11	Raekwon	Criminology	RZA	Ghostface Killah
12	Joe Budden	Pusha Man	White Boy	
13	Melle Mel	White Lines (Don't Do It)	Sylvia Robinson	
14		Balls And My Word (Interlude)		
15	The Lox	Money, Power & Respect	Deric "D-Dot" Angelettie & Ron "Amen-Ra" Lawrence	Lil' Kim & DMX
16	Ice Cube	A Bird In The Hand	The Boogie Men & Ice Cube	
17		Junkie (Interlude)		
18	Styles P	"Good Times"	Swizz Beats & Saint Denson	
19	Jay-Z	1-900-Hustler	Bink	Beanie Sigel, Memphis Bleek & Freeway
20		The Set Up (Interlude)		
21	Shyne	Bad Boyz	EZ Elpee	Barrington Levy
22	The Diplomats	Dipset Anthem	Heatmakerz	
23	Mobb Deep	G.O.D. Pt. III	Mobb Deep	
