= The Source Hip Hop Music Awards 2001 =

Compilation album by Various artists
- Released: August 14, 2001
- Genre: Hip hop, rap, mainstream urban
- Label: Def Jam Recordings

The Source chronology
The Source Presents: Hip Hop Hits, Vol. 4 (2000)	The Source Hip Hop Music Awards 2001 (2001)	The Source Presents: Hip Hop Hits, Vol. 5 (2001)

Professional ratings
Review scores
Source	Rating
AllMusic	4.5/5 stars

Hip Hop Music Awards 2001 is a compilation album released by The Source magazine. It was the third and final annual album to feature nominees of the magazine's award show. It contained nineteen hip hop and rap hits (two of them being bonus tracks). It went to number 34 on the Top R&B/Hip Hop Albums chart and peaked at number 28 on the Billboard 200 album chart.

This is the only The Source Hip Hop Music Awards compilation to feature a Billboard Hot 100 and R&B and Hip Hop number one hit: "Ms. Jackson". In addition to that song, two more songs (out of three) made number one on the Hot Rap Tracks chart: "Bow Wow (That's My Name)" and "Oh No".

== Track listing ==
1. "Ms. Jackson" – Outkast
2. "Southern Hospitality" – Ludacris
3. "How Many Licks?" – Lil' Kim and Sisqo
4. "Bonnie & Shyne" – Shyne and Barrington Levy
5. "Who's That Girl?" – Eve
6. "The Blast" – Talib Kweli f. Vinia Mojica
7. "Pull Ova" – Trina
8. "Lay Low" – Snoop Dogg, Master P, Nate Dogg, Butch Cassidy and Tha Eastsidaz
9. "Bow Wow (That's My Name)" – Lil Bow Wow and Snoop Dogg
10. "Gravel Pit" – Wu-Tang Clan
11. "Look Me In My Eyes" – Scarface
12. "E.I." – Nelly
13. "Shake Ya Ass" – Mystikal
14. "X" – Xzibit
15. "Ante Up (Robbing-Hoodz Theory)" – M.O.P. and Funkmaster Flex
16. "Put It On Me" – Ja Rule and Vita
17. "Keep It Thoro" – Prodigy
18. "Making It" – The Poe Boy Family, Rick Ross and Brisco
19. "Oh No" – Mos Def, Pharoahe Monch and Nate Dogg
