= Here I Come =

Here I Come may refer to:

- "Here I Come" (The Roots song), 2006
- "Here I Come" (Fergie song), 2008
- Here I Come (album), a 1985 album by Barrington Levy, and the title song
- Here I Come, the British title for Harvard, Here I Come!, a 1941 American film directed by Lew Landers
- Ready or Not 2: Here I Come, a 2026 American horror comedy film
