= The Source Hip Hop Music Awards 2000 =

Compilation album by Various artists
- Released: August 15, 2000
- Recorded: 1998–2000
- Genre: Hip hop; gangsta rap; R&B
- Length: 1:07:59
- Label: Def Jam Recordings
- Producer: David Mays (exec.); Raymond Scott (exec.); Ayatollah; Buckwild; Carlos Bess; Dr. Dre; Hangmen 3; Havoc; Irv Gotti; Jay Dee; Kanye West; L.T. Hutton; Mannie Fresh; Mel-Man; Q-Tip; Rockwilder; Self Service; Swizz Beatz; Timbaland

The Source chronology
The Source Presents: Hip Hop Hits, Vol. 3 (1999)	The Source Hip Hop Music Awards 2000 (2000)	The Source Presents: Hip Hop Hits, Vol. 4 (2000)

Professional ratings
Review scores
Source	Rating
Allmusic	4/5 stars

The Source Hip Hop Music Awards 2000 is a music compilation album contributed by The Source magazine. Released August 15, 2000 and distributed by Def Jam Recordings, Hip Hop Music Awards 2000 is the second annual album produced by the magazine to focus on its nominees of the now-defunct award show. It features seventeen hip hop and rap hits. It went to number 16 on the Top R&B/Hip Hop Albums chart and peaked at number 17 on the Billboard 200 album chart.

This is the only The Source compilation overall that does not have a number one Hot Rap Tracks hit.

== Track listing ==
Credits adapted from Discogs.

No.	Title	Artist	Producer(s)	Time
1	"What's My Name?"	DMX	Self Service; Irv Gotti	3:52
2	"Forgot About Dre"	Dr. Dre feat. Eminem	Dr. Dre; Mel-Man	3:42
3	"Jigga My Nigga"	Jay-Z	Swizz Beatz	4:34
4	"Bling Bling"	Cash Money Millionaires	Mannie Fresh	5:12
5	"Vivrant Thing"	Q-Tip	Jay Dee; Q-Tip	3:10
6	"You Owe Me"	Nas feat. Ginuwine	Timbaland	4:47
7	"Whoa!"	Black Rob	Buckwild	4:04
8	"Quiet Storm (remix)"	Mobb Deep feat. Lil' Kim	Havoc	4:03
9	"Da Rockwilder"	Method Man & Redman	Rockwilder	2:15
10	"Back That Thang Up"	Juvenile	Mannie Fresh	4:24
11	"Cherchez LaGhost"	Ghostface Killah	Carlos Bess	3:09
12	"Bitch Please"	Snoop Dogg feat. Xzibit	Dr. Dre	3:49
13	"The Truth"	Beanie Sigel	Kanye West	4:09
14	"Got Beef"	Tha Eastsidaz feat. Jayo Felony and Sylk-E. Fyne	L.T. Hutton	4:11
15	"Wild Out"	The LOX	Swizz Beatz	5:07
16	"Ms. Fat Booty"	Mos Def	Ayatollah	3:43
17	"Cold Hearted"	Made Men feat. Wise Guys	Hangmen 3	3:48

== Charts ==
Weekly chart performance for The Source Hip Hop Music Awards 2000
Chart (2000)	Peak position
US Billboard 200	17
US Top R&B/Hip-Hop Albums (Billboard)	16
