= The Source Presents: Hip Hop Hits, Vol. 10 =

Compilation album by Various artists
- Released: July 26, 2005
- Recorded: Various times
- Genre: Hip hop, rap, mainstream urban
- Length: 1:07:42
- Label: Image Entertainment
- Producer: Donald XL Robertson

The Source chronology
The Source Presents: Hip Hop Hits, Vol. 9 (2005)	The Source Presents: Hip Hop Hits, Vol. 10 (2005)

The Source Presents: Hip Hop Hits, Volume 10 is the tenth annual music compilation album to be contributed by The Source magazine and the final album in the Hip Hop Hits series to date. Released July 26, 2005, Hip Hop Hits Volume 10 features sixteen hip hop and rap hits (one of them being the bonus track). It went to number 47 on the Top R&B/Hip Hop Albums chart and number 60 on the Billboard 200 album chart. The album promoted itself on the cover as the "Hip-Hop Hits 10th Anniversary Edition," which is not exactly accurate since the first volume in the compilation series was released eight years ago, and the previous two compilations were released in the same year the year before.

Two songs went to number one on the R&B and Pop music chart: Goodies and Lean Back (the only Hot Rap Tracks number one hit on Volume 10).

== Track listing ==
1. Lean Back - Terror Squad
2. Nolia Clap - Juvenile, UTP
3. Breathe - Fabolous
4. Go D.J. - Lil' Wayne
5. Let's Go - Trick Daddy, Lil' Jon and Twista
6. Hold You Down - The Alchemist and Mobb Deep
7. What U Gon' Do - Lil Jon and Lil' Scrappy
8. Goodies - Ciara
9. Dammit Man - Pitbull featuring Piccallo
10. Certified Gangstas - Jim Jones, The Game, Jay Bezel and Cam'ron
11. Neva Eva - Trillville
12. Wide Body - Benzino
13. Vibrate - Petey Pablo
14. Yes Yes Y'all - Geto Boys
15. Y'all Heard of Me - C Murder and B.G.
16. What's Really Good - Benzino and Scarface
