= Shyne (album) =

Studio album by Shyne
- Released: September 26, 2000
- Recorded: 1999–2000
- Studio: Daddy's House Recording Studios (New York City); The Hit Factory (New York City)
- Genre: East Coast hip hop; gangsta rap
- Length: 56:32
- Label: Bad Boy; Arista
- Producer: Sean "Puff Daddy" Combs (exec.); Shyne; Mario Winans; Yogi; Nashiem Myrick; Chucky Thompson; Daven "Prestige" Vanderpool; The Neptunes

Shyne chronology
Shyne (2000)	Godfather Buried Alive (2004)

Singles from Shyne
- 1. "Bad Boyz" Released: May 27, 2000; 2. "That's Gangsta" Released: October 10, 2000; 3. "Bonnie & Shyne" Released: 2001

Shyne is the debut album by Belizean-American rapper Shyne. It was released by Sean "Puff Daddy" Combs' Bad Boy Records on September 26, 2000. Shyne had been hyped prior to the album's release as similar in style and delivery to the deceased Notorious B.I.G. Shyne had also drawn unfavorable media attention for being convicted in June 2000 for his involvement in a nightclub shooting. Shyne was incarcerated at the time of this album's release. The album debuted and peaked at number five on the Billboard 200 and sold just under 160,000 copies in its first week. It sold very well, eventually achieving Gold status. It contained fewer guest artists than most Bad Boy releases. The singles from the album, "Bad Boyz," "Bonnie & Shyne" (which both feature Barrington Levy), and "That's Gangsta" were moderate hits.

== Critical reception ==
Professional ratings
Review scores
Source	Rating
AllMusic	2/5 stars
Entertainment Weekly	C+
NME	7/10
RapReviews	5/10
Rolling Stone	3/5 stars
The Source	3/5 stars
Spin	6/10
Uncut	4/5 stars

Shyne received mixed reviews from music critics. Jason Birchmeier of AllMusic thought the album was "forgettable" and "far too contrived, seeming staged and overly theatrical". In his review for Entertainment Weekly, Craig Seymour wrote that Shyne lacked the "insight, pathos, and humor" of the Notorious B.I.G. he is trying to imitate, but commended the production of the album. Steve 'Flash' Juon of RapReviews, comparing it to the debut album Life Story of Shyne's labelmate Black Rob, saying that Shyne "lacks the charm" of the former. He described Shyne's vocals as pleasing but uncompelling, pointing out that the album doesn't have a common theme "other than the fact Shyne (or his rap persona) is a flossy criminal". Kris Ex of Rolling Stone thought Shyne "could be the pinnacle of Y2K thug pathology". He described the production as "dramatic yet minimalist", but also thought Shyne's vocal performance "puts him more in league with B-team players". Jon Caramanica, writing for Spin, believed the album is "saved by strong producers", who "dress up [Shyne's] rhymes in frenetic electro beats, tweaked synths, and the old steel drum", but criticized the vocals too. "If Shyne's style is twice-heard, his stories are thrice-told", wrote the journalist. Kim Osorio of The Source also thought the album "sport[s] some of the hottest beats hip-hop has heard in a while", but "Shyne [...] doesn't say anything here to make listeners hit rewind".

Derek A. Bardowell of NME commended the rapper, who despite "say[ing] nothing new" has an "uptight, slightly nasal vocal style [...] arresting enough to keep it interesting". Talking about the production, he added that Shyne "features some of the most original beats laced on a hip-hop album this year". Uncut magazine described the album as "[t]houghtful soulful declamations delivered with a deep hued baritone".

== Track listing ==
No.	Title	Writer(s)	Producer(s)	Length
1.	"Dear America (Intro)"		Shyne	1:08
2.	"Whatcha Gonna Do"	J. Barrow, D. Trotman	Dee Trotman	4:49
3.	"Bang"	J. Barrow, J. Graham	Yogi	4:50
4.	"Bad Boyz" (featuring Barrington Levy)	J. Barrow, L. Porter, B. Levy, D. Bowie, J. Osterberg	EZ Elpee	3:48
5.	"Let Me See Your Hands"	J. Barrow, S. Everett	Shampelle Everett	4:31
6.	"Gangsta Prayer (Interlude)"	J. Barrow, S. Combs, M. Winans	Mario Winans	1:01
7.	"The Life"	J. Barrow, N. Myrick, M. Winans, S. Combs, L. Caston, A. Poree	Nashiem Myrick, Mario Winans (co.), Sean "Puffy" Combs (co.)	5:16
8.	"It's Ok"	J. Barrow, D. Vanderpool, S. Combs, M. Winans, Hutchins, Robertson, Selignam	Daven "Prestige" Vanderpool, Sean "Puffy" Combs (co.), Mario Winans (co.)	3:48
9.	"Niggas Gonna Die"	J. Barrow, P. Williams, C. Hugo	The Neptunes	3:29
10.	"Everyday (Interlude)"		Shyne	1:03
11.	"Bonnie & Shyne" (featuring Barrington Levy)	J. Barrow, C. Thompson, B. Levy, M. David, E. Gassion, L. Guglielmi	Chucky Thompson	4:17
12.	"The Hit"	J. Barrow, L. Porter, S. Combs, M. Winans, M. Alejandro, A. Magdalena	EZ Elpee, Sean "Puffy" Combs (co.), Mario Winans (co.)	2:59
13.	"That's Gangsta"	J. Barrow, S. Combs, M. Winans, L. Sylvers	Sean "Puffy" Combs, Mario Winans	3:43
14.	"Spend Some Cheese"	J. Barrow, M. Winans, S. Combs	Mario Winans	4:40
15.	"Get Out" (featuring Slim of 112)	J. Barrow, M. Winans, S. Combs	Mario Winans	2:56
16.	"Commission"	J. Barrow, N. Myrick, J. Garfield	Nashiem Myrick & Jay "Waxx" Garfield	4:11

== Samples ==
Credits are adapted from the album's liner notes.

- "That's Gangsta"
  - "Misdemeanor" by Foster Sylvers
  - "It's Funky Enough" by The D.O.C.
- "Commission"
  - "You Were Made For Me" by Luther Ingram
- "It's OK"
  - "Magic Wand" by Whodini
- "The Life"
  - "Just Memories" by Eddie Kendricks
- "Bonnie & Shyne"
  - "La Vie En Rose" by Grace Jones
- "The Hit"
  - "Todo Se Derrumbo Dentro De Mi" by Emmanuel
- "Bad Boyz"
  - "Nightclubbin'" by Grace Jones
  - "Here I Come" by Barrington Levy
- "Whatcha Gonna Do"
  - "Set It Off" by Strafe
  - "Whoa!" by Black Rob
  - Violins sampled from "Days of Pearly Spencer" by David McWilliams

== Credits ==
Credits are adapted from the album's liner notes.

- Sean "P. Diddy" Combs – composer, executive producer
- Harve "Joe Hooker" Pierre – associate executive producer, A&R
- Chris Athens – mastering
- Marc "DJ Fafu" Pfafflin – scratches, engineer
- Paul Logus – mixing, engineer
- Ed Raso – mixing, engineer
- Michael Patterson – mixing, engineer
- Joe Perrera – mixing
- Rob Paustian – mixing, engineer
- Roger Che – engineer
- Charles Spencer – engineer
- Dominick Mancuso – engineer
- Lynn Montrose – engineer
- Eric "Ebo" Butler – engineer
- Rasheed Goodlowe – engineer
- Jim Janik – engineer
- Stephen Dent – engineer
- George "G-Man" Grimstead – engineer
- Franko Caligiuri – art director
- Kevin Knight – photography
- Bobby Springsteen – A&R
- Kim Lumpkin – project manager
- Deborah Mannis-Gardner – sample clearance

== Charts ==
=== Weekly charts ===
Chart (2000)	Peak position
US Billboard 200	5
US Top R&B/Hip-Hop Albums (Billboard)	2

=== Year-end charts ===
Chart (2000)	Position
US Top R&B/Hip-Hop Albums (Billboard)	72
Chart (2001)	Position
US Top R&B/Hip-Hop Albums (Billboard)	92
