= The Source Presents: Hip Hop Hits, Vol. 5 =

Compilation album by Various artists
- Released: December 18, 2001
- Recorded: Various times
- Genre: Hip hop, rap, mainstream urban
- Length: unknown
- Label: Def Jam Recordings

The Source chronology
The Source Hip Hop Music Awards 2001 (2001)	The Source Presents: Hip Hop Hits, Vol. 5 (2001)	The Source Presents: Hip Hop Hits, Vol. 6 (2002)

Professional ratings
Review scores
Source	Rating
Allmusic	3/5 stars

The Source Presents: Hip Hop Hits, Volume 5 is the fifth annual music compilation album to be contributed by The Source magazine. Released December 18, 2001, and distributed by Def Jam Recordings, Hip Hop Hits Volume 5 features sixteen hip hop and rap hits (two of them are bonus tracks). It went to number 37 on the Top R&B/Hip Hop Albums chart and peaked at number 48 on the Billboard 200 album chart.

Purple Pills (or Purple Hills) is the only number-one Hot Rap Tracks hit on Volume 5. Likewise, the album is the second in Hip Hop Hits series to feature a Billboard Hot 100 number one hit (Volume 1 is first): I'm Real. It is the fourth Hip Hop Hits album not to feature a number-one hit on the R&B/Hip Hop chart.

== Track listing ==
1. We Right Here – DMX
2. I'm a Thug – Trick Daddy
3. I'm Real – Ja Rule and Jennifer Lopez
4. Let Me Blow Ya Mind – Eve and Gwen Stefani
5. Area Codes – Ludacris and Nate Dogg
6. Bad Boy for Life – P. Diddy, Black Rob and Mark Curry
7. Ride wit Me – Nelly and City Spud
8. Purple Pills – D12
9. Bang ta Dis – Benzino
10. Oh Yeah – Foxy Brown and Spragga Benz
11. Front 2 Back – Xzibit
12. Get Ur Freak On – Missy Elliott
13. Project Bitch – Cash Money Millionaires
14. Put Ya Hands Up – Jadakiss
15. Get Fucked Up – Iconz
16. So Fresh, So Clean – Outkast and Sleepy Brown

== Alternate titles ==
The edited version of the compilation featured substitute clean titles: Purple Hills, Project Chick and Get Crunked Up.
