= Englishman (album) =

Studio album by Barrington Levy
- Released: 1979
- Recorded: Channel One Studios, Kingston, Jamaica
- Genre: Dancehall
- Length: 35:30
- Label: Jah Life / Greensleeves / Nyam Up
- Producer: Henry "Junjo" Lawes

Barrington Levy chronology
Bounty Hunter (1979)	Englishman (1979)	Robin Hood (1980)

Professional ratings
Review scores
Source	Rating
AllMusic	4/5 stars

Englishman is an album by Jamaican dancehall musician Barrington Levy, released in 1979 (see 1979 in music). A relaxed, sultry album, Englishman was one of Levy's most popular albums, especially outside of Jamaica. The Roots Radics provided the rhythm tracks.

== Track listing ==
1. "Englishman" (Lawes) – 3:31
2. "If You Give to Me" (Levy) – 3:58
3. "Sister Carol" (Levy) – 3:52
4. "Don't Fuss nor Fight" (Lawes, Levy) – 2:36
5. "Look Girl" (Levy) – 3:11
6. "Look Youthman" (Levy) – 3:12
7. "Send a Moses" (Lawes) – 3:32
8. "Black Heart Man" (Lawes) – 4:15
9. "Money Makes Friends" (Lawes) – 3:59
10. "Bend Your Back" (Lawes) – 3:24

== Personnel ==
- Barrington Levy - vocals
- Earl "Chinna" Smith - lead guitar
- Winston "Bo-Pee" Bowen - rhythm guitar
- Errol "Flabba" Holt - bass
- Carlton "Santa" Davis - drums
- Gladstone Anderson - keyboards
- Christopher "Sky Juice" Blake - percussion
- Prince Jammy, Scientist - engineers
