= The Source Presents: Hip Hop Hits, Vol. 8 =

Compilation album by Various artists
- Released: June 29, 2004
- Recorded: Various times
- Genre: Hip hop, rap, mainstream urban
- Length: unknown
- Label: Def Jam Recordings

The Source chronology
The Source Presents: Hip Hop Hits, Vol. 7 (2003)	The Source Presents: Hip Hop Hits, Vol. 8 (2004)	The Source Presents: Hip Hop Hits, Vol. 9 (2004)

Professional ratings
Review scores
Source	Rating
Allmusic	3/5 stars

The Source Presents: Hip Hop Hits, Volume 8 is the eighth annual music compilation album to be contributed by The Source magazine. Released June 29, 2004, and distributed by Image Entertainment, Hip Hop Hits Volume 8 features sixteen hip hop and rap hits (one of them being the bonus track). It went to number 43 on the Top R&B/Hip Hop Albums chart and number 45 on the Billboard 200 album chart. It is also one of only two Hip Hop Hits albums to be released in the same year; Volume 9 was released six months later.

Three songs peaked number one on the Hot Rap Tracks chart: Damn!, Right Thurr and Tipsy. Volume 8 is the fifth album in the Hip Hop Hits series that does not feature a number one on the R&B chart; it is the sixth not to feature a number-one hit on the pop charts.

== Track listing ==
1. Damn! - YoungBloodZ
2. Industry - Wyclef Jean
3. Right Thurr - Chingy
4. Can't Stop, Won't Stop - Young Gunz
5. Gangsta Nation - Nate Dogg and Westside Connection
6. Clap Back - Ja Rule
7. Through the Wire - Kanye West
8. Skills - Gang Starr
9. Tipsy - J-Kwon
10. Quarterbackin' - Clipse and E-40
11. Into You - Fabolous and Tamia
12. Be Easy - T.I.
13. Hotel - R. Kelly and Cassidy
14. Salt Shaker - Ying Yang Twins featuring Lil Jon & The East Side Boyz
15. Recognize - Scarface
16. Relationships (With Me and My Gun) - Benzino and Untouchables
