= Here I Come (album) =

Studio album by Barrington Levy
- Released: 1985
- Recorded: 1984 Channel One Studios, Kingston, Jamaica
- Genre: Dancehall
- Label: Greensleeves
- Producer: Paul "Jah Screw" Love

Here I Come is a reggae album by Barrington Levy. The music was recorded at Channel One Studios in Kingston, Jamaica. It was released in 1985 on LP on Time I Records, and once again in 1988 on CD.

The album was well-received, with Jack Barron of Sounds giving it a three and three-quarter star rating, calling it "a deviously diverting record".

The track "Here I Come" was sampled by Rebel MC (Congo Natty) on his 1991 UK Top 40 hit "Tribal Base", with Levy appearing to perform the sample on Top of the Pops, on 20 June 1991, alongside Rebel MC and Tenor Fly. The track was also sampled on "Harlem World" from the album Return to the 36 Chambers: The Dirty Version by Ol' Dirty Bastard (produced by Big Dore) and by Shyne in "Bad Boyz". It is also featured in the soundtracks of the video games Saints Row 2 and Grand Theft Auto San Andreas (on the fictional K-JAH WEST radio station).

The track "The Vibes is Right" was sampled by Fabolous on "Frenemies (feat. Josh K)" from the album Summertime Shootout 3: Coldest Summer Ever.

== Track listing ==
1. "Here I Come"
2. "Do the Dance"
3. "Under Mi Sensi"
4. "Vibes Is Right"
5. "Real Thing"
6. "Cool and Loving"
7. "Struggler"
8. "Live Good"
9. "Moonlight Lover"
10. "A Ya We Deh"
11. "Give Me Your Love"
12. "Don't Run Away"

== Personnel ==
- Barrington Levy - vocals
- Eric "Bingy Bunny" Lamont - lead guitar
- Tony, Stanley - rhythm guitar
- Errol "Flabba" Holt, Prince Larry - bass
- Lincoln "Style" Scott, Lloyd "Jah Bunny" Donaldson - drums
- Carlton "Bubblers" Ogilvie, Michael - keyboards
- Paul "Jah Screw" Love - percussion
- Dean Fraser, Eddie "Tan Tan" Thornton - horns
