= The Source Presents: Hip Hop Hits, Vol. 6 =

2002 compilation album by various artists

Compilation album by Various artists
- Released: December 10, 2002
- Recorded: Various times
- Genre: Hip hop, rap, mainstream urban
- Length: unknown
- Label: Def Jam Recordings

The Source chronology
The Source Presents: Hip Hop Hits, Vol. 5 (2001)	The Source Presents: Hip Hop Hits, Vol. 6 (2002)	The Source Presents: Hip Hop Hits, Vol. 7 (2003)

Professional ratings
Review scores
Source	Rating
AllMusic	3/5 stars

The Source Presents: Hip Hop Hits, Volume 6 is the sixth annual music compilation album to be contributed by The Source magazine. Released December 10, 2002, and distributed by Def Jam Recordings, Hip Hop Hits Volume 6 features eighteen hip hop and rap hits. It went to number 31 on the Top R&B/Hip Hop Albums chart and number 35 on the Billboard 200 album chart (the highest peak of any The Source Presents album on the latter).

Two songs, "I Need a Girl (Part II)" and "Oh Boy", reached the number-one peak on the Hot Rap Tracks chart with the latter also reaching number one on the Hot R&B/Hip-Hop Songs chart. This is the fourth Hip Hop Hits compilation not to feature a number-one Hot 100/pop hit.

== Track listing ==
1. I Need a Girl (Part Two) - P. Diddy, Ginuwine, Loon, Mario Winans and Tammy Ruggieri
2. #1 - Nelly
3. Down 4 U - Ja Rule, Ashanti, Charli Baltimore and Vita
4. Oh Boy - Cam'ron and Juelz Santana
5. Guess Who's Back - Scarface, Jay-Z and Beanie Sigel
6. Pass the Courvoisier (remix) - Busta Rhymes, P. Diddy and Pharrell
7. Roc the Mic - Beanie Sigel and Freeway
8. Without Me - Eminem
9. Still Fly - Big Tymers
10. What's Luv? - Fat Joe, Ja Rule and Ashanti
11. Boottee (remix) - Benzino, G. Dep and Fabolous
12. Nothin' - N.O.R.E.
13. Stylin' - Foxy Brown
14. Good Times - Styles P
15. Welcome to Atlanta (Coast 2 Coast Remix) - Jermaine Dupri, Featuring P. Diddy, Snoop Dogg and Murphy Lee
16. Rollout (My Business) - Ludacris
17. Say I Yi Yi - Ying Yang Twins
18. Grindin' - Clipse, N.O.R.E., Baby and Lil Wayne
