= Barrington (album) =

Studio album by Barrington Levy
- Released: 1993
- Genre: Dancehall
- Label: MCA
- Producers: Lee Jaffe, Andre Betts, Sly Dunbar, Robbie Shakespeare

Barrington Levy chronology
Turning Point (1992)	Barrington (1993)	Duets (1995)

Barrington is an album by the Jamaican musician Barrington Levy, released in 1993. It was regarded as a crossover attempt. The first single was "Murder". Levy supported the album with a North American tour.

"Work" and "Vice Versa Love" charted on the UK Singles Chart, at Nos. 65 and 79, respectively.

== Production ==
The album was produced by Lee Jaffe, Andre Betts, Sly Dunbar, and Robbie Shakespeare. A version of "Under Me Sensi" was first recorded by Levy in the 1980s, under the slightly different title of "Under Mi Sensi". Vernon Reid and Betty Wright contributed to Barrington. Rakim rapped on "Murderer"; Yomo Toro played cuatro on "Be Strong". "Vice Versa Love" is performed as a ballad.

== Critical reception ==
Professional ratings
Review scores
Source	Rating
AllMusic	4.5/5 stars
Calgary Herald	B+
Chicago Tribune	3/4 stars
The Encyclopedia of Popular Music	3/5 stars
MusicHound World: The Essential Album Guide	2/5 stars
The Philadelphia Inquirer	3/4 stars

The Calgary Herald opined that Levy's "honey-toned voice often reminds you of classic soul singers and, at times, his vocal scatting suggests he's a Caribbean brother of Van Morrison." The Philadelphia Inquirer stated that "Levy has one of the most distinctive voices in reggae, characterized by an otherworldly yodel/howl he uses not as a gimmick, but as an astutely employed vocal device."

The St. Louis Post-Dispatch lamented the overly commercial sound of the album, writing that "even though this latest release once again displays Levy's captivating vocals, the shift in musical direction is as drastic as it gets." The Chicago Tribune thought that "Levy excels on soulful, itchy selections such as 'Work' and 'Be Strong', both of which show a deep debt to African-American music and dance."

AllMusic wrote that "Vice Versa Love" is a "standout, a showcase for Levy's most inspiring performances as he soulfully cries out for love and unity."

== Track listing ==
No.	Title	Length
1.	"Survival"
2.	"Murderer"
3.	"Work"
4.	"Be Strong"
5.	"Under Me Sensi"
6.	"Vice Versa Love"
7.	"Teacher"
8.	"90% There"
9.	"Nothing's Changed"
10.	"Strange"
