= The Source (magazine) =

American hip hop magazine

- Cover of November 2008 issue
- Editor: Jonathan Shecter/Adario Strange/Selwyn Seyfu Hinds/Kim Osorio
- Categories: Music magazine
- Frequency: Monthly (1991–2013); 1–2 per year (post-2014)
- Founder: David Mays
- First issue: 1988; 38 years ago
- Company: The NorthStar Group
- Country: United States
- Based in: New York City, New York, U.S.
- Language: English
- Website: thesource.com
- ISSN: 1063-2085

The Source is an American music magazine and website specializing in hip-hop and entertainment. Founded in August 1988 by Harvard University students David Mays and Jonathan Shecter, it began as a black-and-white, one-page newspaper promoting their college radio show. Within months, it evolved into a professionally designed, full-color magazine. Dubbed "the bible of hip-hop," primarily focused on hip-hop music and culture while also covering politics and fashion. Its music reviews held great significance in the hip-hop community, with the "five mics" rating considered a prestigious honor and a significant achievement. The ratings often sparked heated debates among both artists and fans.

At its height in the late 1990s, The Source was the highest-selling magazine on the newsstands in the United States. It launched its own compilation album series and an award show. The 1995 Source Awards were noted for their effect on the hip-hop landscape, particularly in escalating tension between the East and West Coast hip-hop communities, which ultimately resulted in the murders of The Notorious B.I.G. and Tupac Shakur.

Several controversies embroiled The Source throughout its history, often leading to editor walkouts. The most publicized of these, its feud with Eminem, was among the factors that contributed to its decline. Financial struggles worsened as the launch of its website in the early 2000s resulted in significant losses, forcing David Mays to sell part of the magazine. These challenges ultimately led to the magazine's bankruptcy and shareholders firing Mays in 2006.

In 2008, the magazine was purchased by the publisher L. Londell McMillan, who successfully brought back major advertisers. However, in the 2010s, as advertising revenue declined and online publications became more dominant, McMillan was forced to downsize the team and reduce the magazine's publication frequency.

== History ==
=== 1988–1991: Early years and relocation to New York ===
The Source was founded in August 1988, by two Harvard University students, David Mays and Jonathan Shecter. The two had the show Street Beat on the college radio station WHRB, initially using The Source to promote it. According to Mays, the name of the magazine comes from the song "Ya Slippin'" by Boogie Down Productions. The first issue was a one-page newsletter, distributed for free. It was printed on Mays's personal Macintosh computer and funded with $200 of their own money. The mailing list of the radio show's listeners initially served as the magazine's readership. Two other Harvard students, H. Edward Young and James Bernard, soon joined the team; Young helped Mays with the business side of the magazine, while Bernard and Shecter worked on its content. With a $10,000 loan from a friend, they purchased better hardware and rented an office in Somerville, Massachusetts, which allowed them to publish 10,000 copies every two months. During its first year, the magazine adopted full-color covers, and then transitioned into a professionally designed 64-page monthly magazine during the second year.

There was better criticism to be had in The Village Voice, better industry coverage in Billboard, better reporting and actual copy-editing in Spin, but The Source had the authority of young heads on a mission.

— Jeff Chang, Can't Stop Won't Stop: A History of the Hip-Hop Generation

After Mays and Shecter graduated in June 1990, the magazine moved from Boston, Massachusetts to New York City. To financially support the move, the team asked for advance payments for ads from several record labels, raising $70,000. Their editorial team, called the Mind Squad, was also growing; by 1991, it included Reginald Dennis, Chris Wilder, Matteo "Matty C" Capoluongo, Rob "Reef" Tewlow, Bobbito Garcia, dream hampton, and Kierna Mayo, along with other contributors. Matty C was responsible for the "Unsigned Hype" section, which showcased up-and-coming rappers, and helped launch the careers of numerous artists, including Notorious B.I.G., DMX, Common, Mobb Deep, DJ Shadow, and Eminem. James Bernard became the magazine's coeditor-in-chief, and Chris Wilder was its senior editor. Reginald Dennis, who joined the magazine as an intern, became its music editor, responsible for the "Record Report" album review section. The Source's album ratings, presented on a scale from one to five microphones ("mics"), (Note: Initially, The Source's album reviews did not include ratings. When the magazine began using ratings, it first used exploding records, which were later replaced by microphones.) often led to hot debates, both inside the Mind Squad and outside of the magazine. Pitchfork's Dean Van Nguyen wrote: "The Source's mic-based rating system became the most trusted scale of quality in rap." The magazine's highest rating—five mics, signifying "a hip-hop classic"—became highly sought after. "That half-mic to five-mic system really meant something to hip-hop artists. People wanted to start fights with Source writers over reviews—and some writers got terrorized", said Greg Tate.

Since its early days, the magazine branched out from hip-hop music into topics like fashion, graffiti, and politics, highlighting various issues affecting the Black community. Adopting the tagline "the magazine of hip-hop music, culture & politics", The Source published stories on protests against police brutality, misogyny and violence against women. In 1991, the magazine hosted a summit for rappers affiliated with the Five-Percent Nation. Next year, James Bernard flew to Los Angeles during the riots and spent several days interviewing locals, publishing an article that stood apart from the coverage by the mainstream media.

By 1991, The Source had a circulation of 40,000 and reached nearly a million dollars in revenue. David Mays said in an interview with The Wall Street Journal that he wanted The Source to be "Rolling Stone of the next generation". Chuck D of Public Enemy praised The Source, calling it "the bible of the hip-hop industry"; the phrase was shortened to "the bible of hip-hop" and used by the magazine throughout its history. The magazine, which was previously sold via subscriptions and in record stores, now had newsstand distribution across the United States. It was also available in Canada, England, Australia, Italy, and the Netherlands. Mays, Shecter, and Bernard discussed selling the magazine to the producer Quincy Jones, the entrepreneur Russell Simmons, and the media conglomerate Time Warner. The negotiations were unsuccessful because the team thought Time Warner's offer was too low. Two years later, Jones launched a competing magazine, Vibe.

=== 1992–1995: The Mind Squad leaving, the Source Awards ===
The Source continued growing in the following years, reaching a circulation of 100,000 copies in 1994. On April 25 of that year, the magazine launched its first Source Awards show. Prior to the creation of the standalone event, the magazine awarded artists in a special segment of the music show Yo! MTV Raps. The award show was created by David Mays, with him and the rest of the staff believing that other awards, such as the Grammy Awards, underappreciated hip-hop. Tickets for the show sold out in minutes; however, TV networks refused to broadcast it.

The magazine was now the target of criticism and attacks. "Angry over negative coverage or reviews, sometimes even angry over positive coverage, rappers and their handlers issued threats that sometimes became physical attacks," wrote Jeff Chang. David Mays, who had not been involved in the magazine's editorial side since 1989, now frequently relayed to them the complaints he received from rappers, managers, and their labels about certain reviews; the editors ignored him. Rapper KRS-One threatened to boycott the Source Awards, believing that the magazine's staff did not have the authority to judge hip-hop artists. Public Enemy, whose leader previously praised The Source, now released a music video for the song "I Stand Accused," where they destroy the offices of The Sauce magazine. Cypress Hill has burned copies of the magazine during their concerts. West Coast hip-hop artists believed their scene was underrepresented by The Source, which led to the creation of West Coast-focused Rap Pages.

Another point of contention, brought up by KRS-One and other critics of the magazine, was a conflict of interest. During the early days in Boston, David Mays befriended the local rapper Raymond "Ray Dog" Scott, who later chose the stage name Benzino. Along with several other rappers, Benzino formed the Almighty RSO. According to James Bernard, Mays was the group's manager, who helped them get signed to RCA Records. At the time, Mays denied being the group's manager but confirmed that he presented their demo tapes to various record labels. The rest of Mind Squad refused to review the group's upcoming EP Revenge of da Badd Boyz. They accused the group of intimidating the magazine's editors, with Bernard claiming Benzino threatened to "[put them] in bodybags" if the EP received less than 4 mics. Mays asked Bernard for "fair and objective coverage of RSO". In a later interview, Mays said that he believes that "the [magazine's] success was going through [some of the editors'] heads" and that the attitude shift caused them to lose the genuine passion and appreciation for the music and culture. After Bernard refused to cover the Almighty RSO, Mays chose to do it himself.

In September 1994, when the November issue of The Source was already prepared for printing, Mays secretly added a feature article about the Almighty RSO. The article, titled "Boston Bigshots," was written by Mays himself and Bönz Malone. Described by The New York Times as laudatory, the article did not disclose any connections between its authors and the group. It is not mentioned in the magazine's table of contents, as the pages used by it were prepared for advertisements. No other members of the Mind Squad knew about the article's existence. When Bernard found out about it, he called the rest of the staff for an emergency meeting, where they decided that Mays needed to resign. After Bernard and Shecter confronted him the next day, he called Benzino, who in turn called Shecter to threaten him. Upon presenting a recording of the call to the police, Shecter received advice to resolve the conflict without arresting Benzino. On the next day, when the Almighty RSO had a press day at RCA, James Bernard and Reginald Dennis went there to hand Benzino a summons. When he realized they were there to "embarrass" him, four members of RSO started a fight with Bernard and Dennis. Benzino claims the group threw the journalists through a glass door, losing the deal with RCA as the result. After returning to The Source offices, Bernard sent his resignation letter via fax machine to 750 music industry executives. In the five-page letter, Bernard denounced Mays and called for his resignation. When they saw that public condemnation of Mays had no effect, they attempted to force him to sell his share of the magazine. However, they needed the support of the fourth owner, H. Edward Young. When he refused to cooperate, Bernard, Shecter, Dennis, and six other editors left the magazine. Despite the setback, the magazine published its next, December 1994 issue on time, with the help of temporary writers. Bernard and Shecter received stock certificates, which Mays later bought back. In 1997, Bernard and Dennis launched XXL magazine, which would be The Source's main competitor throughout the early 2000s.

Following the editors' walkout, Benzino gradually became more involved with the magazine. In 1995, he became a business partner of Mays, with Los Angeles Times describing his role as a "charismatic consultant". Mays did not officially acknowledge his involvement until 2002. Critics of The Source believed Benzino received preferential treatment in the magazine and later used it during his feuds. "[Benzino] increasingly became [the magazine's] public face, particularly when he provoked bitter feuds," wrote Paul Gorman in his book Totally Wired.

The magazine's next event, the 1995 Source Awards, was the first rap award show ever televised. The show is considered an important moment in hip-hop's history and is often seen as the catalyst for the East Coast–West Coast hip-hop rivalry. In his op-ed for Time magazine, Questlove of the Roots, who attended the show, described it as a "funeral in hip hop's history". While receiving an award, Death Row's CEO, Suge Knight, invited other artists to join his label if they did not want to "worry about the executive producer trying to be all in the videos, all on the record, dancing". This comment was widely interpreted as a jab aimed at Puff Daddy, CEO of the East Coast label Bad Boy. During the same ceremony, the Southern hip-hop group Outkast was booed by the rest of the audience as they accepted the award for Best New Artist. Frustrated, the group's member André 3000 ended his speech with "The South got something to say"—a line that, according to Sierra A. Porter of USA Today, "became a mantra" for Southern hip-hop artists. Over the following years, Southern hip-hop rose to prominence, reshaping the sound and landscape of hip-hop.

=== 1996–1999: Growth, internal conflicts, and editorial changes ===
The magazine continued expanding throughout the second half of the 1990s. Apart from the award show, David Mays launched syndicated The Source Magazine Radio Network, The Source Magazine All Hip-Hop Hour television program, The Source Presents: Hip Hop Hits compilation album series, and The Source Youth Foundation. By 1997, The Source was the highest-selling music magazine on newsstands in the United States, with circulation of 317,369 copies compared to Rolling Stone's 169,625 copies. The same year Mays and Rolling Stone's co-founder Jann Wenner entered partnership negotiations, but the two could not agree on terms.

After the original Mind Squad left the magazine in 1994, the editorial side was led by Bönz Malone, Marc "Ronin Ro" Flores, and Adario Strange, who became editor-in-chief in 1995. Selwyn Seyfu Hinds, who previously worked at The Village Voice, was chosen for the music editor position. Hinds brought more editors, such as Tracii McGregor and Ego Trip's co-founder Elliott Wilson. When Adario Strange left the magazine in 1997, Selwyn Seyfu Hinds replaced him as editor-in-chief, while Elliott Wilson became The Source's music editor. Edward Young, the last original partner of David Mays, also left the magazine in 1997.

This is what the journalists didn't understand. If they give [artists] two and a half mics and the label that the group came from is paying us half a million a year in advertisement, it doesn't work good for us. [...] Integrity, integrity... Integrity don't pay the bills.

— Interview with Benzino, 2023

In 1998, Elliott Wilson left The Source, stating that he resigned after discovering that David Mays had secretly increased the album ratings of Kurupt's Kuruption! and Canibus' Can-I-Bus. In a later interview, Wilson said that, in hindsight, he does not consider the rating change to be significant. "But you couldn't tell me nothing at that time, 'cause I'm all young and passionate, I've been done wrong and this isn't right," said the journalist. A year later, Elliott Wilson joined the competing magazine XXL as editor-in-chief. Driven by "personal resentment," he made it his goal to overtake The Source as the most popular hip-hop magazine.

The magazine further expanded in 1998 with the launch of its website. According to David Mays, maintaining full ownership was important to him. Rather than launching the website in a partnership and splitting expenses, he funded its development with a $12 million loan, using the magazine as collateral. "I took a gamble that in retrospect I shouldn't have taken," Mays said in a 2022 interview. Burdened by loan payments in the wake of the dot-com crash, in 2002 he sold 18% of the magazine to the private equity firm Black Enterprise/Greenwich Street for $12 million. Later that year Mays received an $18 million loan from Textron Financial, which he used to repay an earlier loan and cover the losses.

The circulation reached 450,000 in 1999. The same year, Selwyn Hinds resigned following a disagreement with Benzino. Made Men, Benzino's new group, was preparing the release of their debut album, Classic Limited Edition. The magazine's Source Films was working on the heavily advertised Made Men movie. After the group was placed on the cover of Rap Pages magazine, Benzino demanded the same treatment from The Source. According to Miami New Times, Hinds left the magazine after a tense meeting with Benzino, who was dissatisfied with "Hinds treating the Made Men as something less than superstars" and refusing to give them a cover story. Los Angeles Times wrote that Hinds left after the review of Classic Limited Edition was altered. In the review, written by a fictitious pseudonymous editor, the album received a near-perfect 4.5 mics rating. After Hinds' departure, Carlito Rodriguez was named the next editor-in-chief.

After a several-year hiatus, the Source Awards returned in 1999. The next two events were held in California, airing in prime time on national television. The 2000 event ended abruptly when police intervened following a fight on stage. In 2001, the awards moved to Miami, Florida, with improved security measures following the incident.

The Source launched three international editions: The Source Latino, The Source France, and The Source Japan. The French version, launched in 2003, did not meet expected readership levels, with the heavily promoted first issue selling 14,000 copies out of 70,000 printed. By the time it closed in 2005, its monthly readership had dropped to 6,500.

=== 2003–2004: Feuds with XXL and Eminem ===
Soon after Carlito Rodriguez left The Source in 2002, music editor Kim Osorio became its first female editor-in-chief. During her tenure, the magazine's circulation peaked at nearly 500,000 copies. The magazine was also embroiled in several feuds during that era. Elliott Wilson, then editor-in-chief of XXL magazine, began attacking The Source and its staff. In December 2002, he placed an ad in Billboard magazine, urging advertisers to switch from The Source to XXL. Over the following months, Wilson and Osorio exchanged attacks in the editorials of their respective magazines. The February 2003 issue of The Source featured a poster with a cartoon muscleman breaking Elliott Wilson in half. In response, XXL published a caricature of aged Benzino with his son. According to Elliott Wilson, Benzino, furious over the caricature, confronted him in the XXL office, prompting Wilson to stop the attacks.

Another, highly publicized feud was between Benzino and the rapper Eminem. (Note: At the beginning of his career, Eminem was featured in the Unsigned Hype column in 1998.) Believing that Eminem is an industry plant who "takes sales away from all the other rappers", Benzino attacked him with several diss tracks. Eminem responded with his own diss tracks, including "Nail in the Coffin," which, according to Billboard, "marked the start of what would turn out to be a swift decline [of The Source] from the top of the rap media world". When Benzino was added to the magazine's masthead as a co-founder in 2003, he began using the magazine as a platform to attack Eminem. In February, the magazine published an essay titled "The Unbearable Whiteness of Emceeing", criticizing Eminem. This issue also included a poster with a cartoon depiction of Benzino holding Eminem's severed head. In response, Eminem's label, Interscope, pulled its advertisements from The Source, with Def Jam soon following them. David Mays said in an interview that this move did not affect the magazine, as these advertisements only accounted for a small fraction of their revenue. The 2003 Source Awards show in Miami was largely ignored by popular artists. Despite previously having an unresolved conflict with XXL, Eminem now began cooperating with the magazine. Its March 2003 issue, featuring Eminem, Dr. Dre, and 50 Cent on the cover, was the first XXL issue that outsold The Source on the newsstands. According to Jeremy Miller, then chief operating officer of The Source, the feud with Eminem had a negative impact on the magazine's sales. "Within a year, newsstand sales went from 380,000 to 300,000 to 270,000. That was huge," said Miller. In 2004, The Source stopped providing its circulation data to the Audit Bureau of Circulations for an independent audit.

In November 2003, The Source held a press conference where Mays and Benzino played previously unreleased demo recordings of young Eminem, in which he expresses contempt towards Black women and uses racial slurs. The magazine had planned to cover the recordings in detail, but was ultimately allowed by the court to only release a 20-second snippet, which was included in the February 2004 issue. Eminem publicly apologized for the lyrics, explaining that he was frustrated following a breakup with his Black girlfriend. He later successfully sued The Source after the magazine posted full lyrics on its website.

=== 2005–present: Lawsuits, bankruptcy, relaunch under a new management ===
Kim Osorio was fired from The Source in March 2005. Soon after, she sued the magazine, David Mays, and Benzino for sexual harassment, gender discrimination, defamation, retaliatory discharge and maintaining a hostile work environment. The jury dismissed the allegations of discrimination and sexual harassment but ruled in favor of Osorio on her defamation and retaliation claims. She was initially awarded $15.5 million, though the amount was later reduced to $8 million.

Joshua "Fahiym" Ratcliffe was named the next editor-in-chief; he resigned five months later, due to a disagreement with Benzino over the score for Little Brother's album The Minstrel Show. Following his departure, former Village Voice writer Dasun Allah served as The Source's editor-in-chief for four months before being fired.

Throughout the year, the magazine was targeted with several other lawsuits. Image Entertainment sued them for failing to produce two Hip Hop Hits compilation albums, as well as for copyright infringement on their previous compilation albums. Textron Financial filed a lawsuit seeking to place The Source into receivership, claiming it was owed $18 million. The company accused David Mays and Benzino of inadequate financial management, spending on "promotional jewelry" and vacations, while neglecting rent, bills, and taxes.

The contract Mays signed with Black Enterprise/Greenwich Street in 2002 allowed them to take control of the magazine if it defaulted on the loan payments. While it was an improbable scenario in the early 2000s, when the magazine was at its peak, now this clause allowed the company to fire both David Mays and Benzino. Black Enterprise appointed Jeremy Miller as the new publisher of The Source. After an unsuccessful appeal, Mays and Benzino left the magazine in January 2006. Later that year, they launched Hip Hop Weekly, a bimonthly celebrity-focused magazine, modeled after Us Weekly and People.

As the new management began the reorganization process, they faced numerous challenges: the magazine lost advertisers, failed to pay former employees and creditors, and could not deliver new issues to 140,000 subscribers. With $1.3 million in assets and $35 million of debt, the magazine filed for bankruptcy in 2007. Entertainment lawyer and publisher L. Londell McMillan purchased The Source in August 2008. He was familiar with the magazine, as he was one of its creditors. His goal was to "restore the editorial, creative and management integrity of the business". By the end of the year, he had successfully brought back several major advertisers.

Kim Osorio rejoined The Source in 2012 as editor-in-chief. When she left next year to focus on a television career, the magazine abolished the editor-in-chief position and switched to being run by a committee, with senior staff members overseeing its content and McMillan remaining the face of the magazine. With the rise of the Internet era and advertisement revenue further dropping, he had to downsize the team, eventually leaving only a skeleton crew and outsourcing content writing to independent journalists. The magazine switched to releasing an issue every two months but still struggled with this schedule, publishing only three issues in 2014.

== The Source's Five-Mic albums ==
The Record Report is a section in the publication in which the magazine's staff rates hip-hop albums. Ratings range from one to five mics, paralleling a typical five-star rating scale. An album that is rated at four-and-a-half or five mics is considered by The Source to be a superior hip hop album. Over the first ten years or so, the heralded five-mic rating only applied to albums that were universally lauded hip hop albums. A total of 46 albums have been awarded five mics; a complete, chronological list is below.

Albums that originally received five mics:

- People's Instinctive Travels and the Paths of Rhythm – A Tribe Called Quest
- Edutainment – Boogie Down Productions
- Let the Rhythm Hit 'Em – Eric B. & Rakim
- AmeriKKKa's Most Wanted – Ice Cube
- One for All – Brand Nubian
- De La Soul Is Dead – De La Soul
- The Low End Theory – A Tribe Called Quest
- The Don Killuminati: The 7 Day Theory - Makaveli
- Illmatic – Nas
- Life After Death – The Notorious B.I.G.
- Aquemini – Outkast
- The Blueprint – Jay-Z
- Stillmatic – Nas
- The Fix – Scarface
- The Naked Truth – Lil' Kim
- Trill OG – Bun B
- My Beautiful Dark Twisted Fantasy – Kanye West

Albums that were not rated upon their releases, but were later rated five mics in 2002:

- Run-D.M.C. – Run-D.M.C.
- Radio – LL Cool J
- Licensed to Ill – Beastie Boys
- Raising Hell – Run-D.M.C.
- Criminal Minded – Boogie Down Productions
- Paid in Full – Eric B. & Rakim
- By All Means Necessary – Boogie Down Productions
- It Takes a Nation of Millions to Hold Us Back – Public Enemy
- Long Live the Kane – Big Daddy Kane
- Critical Beatdown – Ultramagnetic MCs
- Straight Out the Jungle – Jungle Brothers
- Strictly Business – EPMD
- The Great Adventures of Slick Rick – Slick Rick
- Straight Outta Compton – N.W.A
- No One Can Do It Better – The D.O.C.
- All Eyez on Me – 2Pac

Albums that originally received 4.5 mics, and were later re-rated to five:

- Breaking Atoms – Main Source
- Death Certificate – Ice Cube
- The Chronic – Dr. Dre
- Enter the Wu-Tang (36 Chambers) – Wu-Tang Clan
- Ready to Die – The Notorious B.I.G.
- The Infamous – Mobb Deep
- Only Built 4 Cuban Linx... – Raekwon
- 2001 – Dr. Dre

Albums that originally received four mics, and were later re-rated to five:

- Grip It! On That Other Level – Geto Boys
- Doggystyle – Snoop Doggy Dogg
- The Diary – Scarface
- Me Against the World – 2Pac
- The Score – The Fugees
- Reasonable Doubt - Jay-Z

== Music ==
=== Compilation album ===
The Source released a compilation album of hip-hop hits.

=== Albums ===
Year	Album	Chart Positions	
Year	Album	US	US Hip-Hop
1997	The Source Presents: Hip Hop Hits	38	25
1998	The Source Presents: Hip Hop Hits, Vol. 2	46	29
1999	The Source Hip Hop Music Awards 1999	45	53
1999	The Source Presents: Hip Hop Hits, Vol. 3	45	29
2000	The Source Hip Hop Music Awards 2000	17	16
2000	The Source Presents: Hip Hop Hits, Vol. 4	43	35
2001	The Source Hip Hop Music Awards 2001	28	34
2001	The Source Presents: Hip Hop Hits, Vol. 5	47	38
2002	The Source Presents: Hip Hop Hits, Vol. 6	35	31
2003	The Source Presents: Hip Hop Hits, Vol. 7	89	46
2004	The Source Presents: Hip Hop Hits, Vol. 8	45	43
2004	The Source Presents: Hip Hop Hits, Vol. 9	75	36
2005	The Source Presents: Hip Hop Hits, Vol. 10	60	47
