= L. Londell McMillan =

American attorney (born 1966)

- Born: August 5, 1966 (age 60); New York City, U.S.
- Education: Cornell University
- Occupations: Attorney, publisher, producer
- Title: Entrepreneur, attorney and publisher
- Website: www.thesource.com

L. Londell McMillan (born on August 5, 1966, in Bedford–Stuyvesant, Brooklyn, New York) is an American entertainment attorney, producer, and publisher.

== History ==
McMillan graduated from Brooklyn Technical High School in 1983 and received his undergraduate degree from Cornell University, where he was a Quill and Dagger member, honors graduate, and Academic All-American mentioned football player. After his time at Cornell, he pursued a law career at the New York University School of Law.

McMillan was a faculty member with the Practicing Law Institute; lecturer and featured case study subject of the Harvard Business School. He also has been a guest and commentator on The Oprah Winfrey Show, Today, Entertainment Tonight, and CNN. In 2008, McMillan was named as one of The National Law Journal's 50 most Influential Minority Lawyers in America, and in 2007 was recognized as one of New York's Super Lawyers. He was a recipient of the Metropolitan Black Bar Association Haywood W. Burns, Lawyer of the Year Award in 2001 and was featured on the cover of Black Enterprise magazine in December 2003. McMillan has also been honored among Crain's 100 Most Powerful Minority Leaders. McMillan founded The McMillan Firm; he was a partner and co-head of the Media and Entertainment Global Industry Sector Group at the international law firm of Dewey & LeBoeuf LLP until 2012. McMillan is also the Chairman of The NorthStar Group which owns and operates The Source Magazine (print and digital), Jones Magazine (print and digital) and produces music, arts and cultural events locally, nationally and worldwide. McMillan serves as a business advisor and business manager for individuals and organizations in the private sector and non-profit community.

His clients over the years have included musician Prince before his death and his estate after his death, Lil' Kim, Stevie Wonder, Chaka Khan, Michael Jackson before his death, Roberta Flack, Isaac Hayes, Spike Lee, LL Cool J, Nas, Kanye West, Zhane, Estate of Christopher Wallace, 1996 Olympic Women's Basketball Players Lisa Leslie and Dawn Staley, among other professional athletes and entertainers. Among McMillan's corporate clients have been The Discovery Channel, Time Warner, Screenvision, Radio One, and National Football League, and Mercedes-Benz.

== Community service ==
L. Londell McMillan is committed to community service, having served as General Counsel of the NAACP, Brooklyn Chapter, serves as Chair of NorthStar Charities, co-founder of the Artist Empowerment Coalition, Founder of SOURCE360, and served on the Fund for Public Schools (which raises private financial support for New York City's public schools), and the Benefit Committee of The Jazz Foundation of America, as well as being a member of the board of directors. McMillan is the current owner and group publisher of The NorthStar Group, which publishes Jones Magazine and The Source.
