= The Source Presents: Hip Hop Hits, Vol. 2 =

Compilation album by Various artists
- Released: November 10, 1998
- Recorded: 1997–98
- Genre: Hip hop, rap, mainstream urban
- Length: 1 hour, 10 minutes, 15 seconds
- Label: Polygram

The Source chronology
The Source Presents: Hip Hop Hits (1997)	The Source Presents: Hip Hop Hits, Vol. 2 (1998)	The Source Hip Hop Music Awards 1999 (1999)

Professional ratings
Review scores
Source	Rating
Allmusic	3/5 stars

The Source Presents: Hip Hop Hits, Volume 2 is the second annual music compilation album to be contributed by The Source magazine. Released November 10, 1998 and distributed by Polygram Records, Hip Hop Hits Volume 2 features eighteen hip hop and rap hits. It went to number 29 on the Top R&B/Hip Hop Albums chart and peaked at number 46 on the Billboard 200 album chart.

While the album is the first Hip Hop Hits volume not to feature an R&B/Hip Hop or a pop hit in the number-one position, four tracks on the album had reached number-one on the Billboard Hot Rap Tracks chart: "Deja Vu (Uptown Baby)," "I Got the Hook Up," ""Money, Power, Respect" and "Turn It Up (Remix)/Fire It Up."

== Track listing ==
1. Still Not a Player - Big Punisher Featuring Joe
2. Money Ain't a Thang - Jermaine Dupri Featuring Jay-Z
3. Money, Power & Respect - The LOX Featuring DMX, Lil' Kim
4. Deja Vu (Uptown Baby) - Lord Tariq and Peter Gunz
5. Do for Love - 2Pac
6. Hope I Don't Go Back - E-40
7. Party Ain't a Party - Queen Pen
8. Turn It Up - Busta Rhymes
9. Get at Me Dog - DMX Featuring Sheek Louch
10. Still a G Thang - Snoop Dogg
11. It's Alright - Jay-Z Featuring Memphis Bleek
12. What'cha Gonna Do? - Jayo Felony Featuring Method Man, DMX
13. Horse & Carriage - Cam'ron Featuring Ma$e
14. N.O.R.E. - Noreaga
15. I Got the Hook-Up! - Master P and Sons of Funk
16. Luv 2 Luv U [Remix] - Timbaland & Magoo
17. 4, 3, 2, 1 - LL Cool J Featuring Canibus, DMX, Method Man, Redman
18. Gone Till November - Wyclef Jean

== Charts ==
=== Weekly charts ===
Chart (1998)	Peak position
US Billboard 200	46
US Top R&B/Hip-Hop Albums (Billboard)	29

=== Year-end charts ===
Chart (1999)	Position
US Billboard 200	161
