= The Source Hip Hop Music Awards 1999 =

Compilation album by Various artists
- Released: August 17, 1999
- Genre: Hip hop, mainstream urban
- Length: 73:37
- Label: Def Jam Recordings

The Source chronology
| The Source Presents: Hip Hop Hits, Vol. 2 (1998) | The Source Hip Hop Music Awards 1999 (1999) | The Source Presents: Hip Hop Hits, Vol. 3 (1999) |

Professional ratings
Review scores
| Source | Rating |
|---|---|
| Allmusic | 4/5 stars |

The Source Hip Hop Music Awards 1999 is a music compilation album contributed by The Source magazine. Released on August 17 and distributed by Def Jam Recordings, Hip Hop Music Awards 1999 is the first annual album produced by the magazine to focus on its nominees of the now-defunct award show, owing to the success of its Hip Hop Hits series. It features eighteen hip hop hits. It went to number 53 on the Top R&B/Hip Hop Albums chart and peaked at number 45 on the Billboard 200 album chart. Three songs reached the number one position on the Hot Rap Tracks chart: "Deja Vu (Uptown Baby)," "It Ain't My Fault, Part 2" and "Superthug". The original, unedited version of Eminem's "My Name Is" was accidentally included.

== Track listing ==
1. "Can I Get A..." - Ja Rule, Jay-Z and Amil
2. "Ha" - Juvenile
3. "My Name Is" - Eminem
4. "It Ain't My Fault, Pt. 2" - Mystikal and Silkk the Shocker
5. "Party Is Goin' on Over Here" - Busta Rhymes
6. "It's On" - DJ Clue and DMX
7. "I'll Bee Dat!" - Redman
8. "Superthug" - Noreaga
9. "Deja Vu (Uptown Baby)" - Lord Tariq & Peter Gunz
10. "Thug Girl" - Master P
11. "Is It You? (Déjà Vu)" - Made Men and Master P
12. "Break Ups 2 Make Ups" - D'Angelo and Method Man
13. "Skew It on the Bar-B" - Outkast and Raekwon
14. "Joints & Jam" - The Black Eyed Peas
15. "Militia" - Big Shug, Freddie Foxxx and Gang Starr
16. "Find a Way" - A Tribe Called Quest
17. "You Got Me" - Erykah Badu and The Roots
18. "5 Mics (The Source Anthem)" - The Committee, El Drek, and Kurupt
