= Wesley College (Belize) =

Coordinates: 17.487398°N 88.190507°W

- 34 Yarborough Road, Belize City, Belize

Information
- Type: High School
- Motto: Sursum Corda! (Lift Up Your Hearts!)
- Established: June 1882
- Principal: Roxanne Cleland
- Faculty: 37
- Enrollment: 608

Wesley College is a public coeducational high school located in Yarborough area of Belize City, Belize.

== History ==
In June 1882, the Methodist Church inaugurated the first secondary school in Belize, then British Honduras - Wesley High School. The school began with five boys and the Rev. T.N. Roberts as Principal, in a building at the corner of Albert and South Street. The school was later moved to the corner of Regent and Prince Streets and shortly thereafter (approx. 1889) to the present site at Yarborough Road.

Although circumstances led to the closure of the school for about 12 years between 1896 and 1909, the commitment of the Methodist Community to education remained strong. By 1925, the enrollment stood at 26 scholars. Through the years the number of students gradually increased and in 1950, the first female students were admitted to the school.

The school offers a four-year program which includes a common foundation course at the lower secondary level (1st and 2nd Forms), and four course options at the upper secondary level (3rd and 4th Forms). Students can choose to pursue an Academic Science, Academic Social Science, Business, or Academic General Program. Students are able to perform in the Caribbean Secondary Education Certificate (CSEC) Exams sponsored by the Caribbean Examination Council (CXC) at the end of the four-year program. On completion of their program, some graduates go on to further studies immediately, some enter the workforce by day and engage in further studies in the evenings, while others move solely into the workforce. In September 2003, the tertiary level of the school was re-opened with the resumption of a three-year Junior College/Sixth Form Program.

The school opened a music education center on 19 October 2006 at a cost of BZ$.5 million. The center offers lessons to students as well as community members.

== Notable alumni ==
- Moses Michael Levi Barrow (born Jamal Michael Barrow; 1978), better known by his stage name Shyne, rapper and politician
