= The Source Presents: Hip Hop Hits, Vol. 7 =

Compilation album by Various artists
- Released: December 9, 2003
- Recorded: Various times
- Genre: Hip hop, rap, mainstream urban
- Length: unknown
- Label: Def Jam Recordings

The Source chronology
The Source Presents: Hip Hop Hits, Vol. 6 (2002)	The Source Presents: Hip Hop Hits, Vol. 7 (2003)	The Source Presents: Hip Hop Hits, Vol. 8 (2004)

Professional ratings
Review scores
Source	Rating
Allmusic	3/5 stars

The Source Presents: Hip Hop Hits, Volume 7 is the seventh annual music compilation album to be contributed by The Source magazine. Released December 9, 2003, and distributed by Def Jam Recordings, Hip Hop Hits Volume 7 features fifteen hip hop and rap hits (one of them being the bonus track). It went to number 49 on the Top R&B/Hip Hop Albums chart and number 86 on the Billboard 200 album chart.

This is the fifth album in the series not to have a Hot 100 number one hit, but three songs, Air Force Ones, Jump Off and Work It hit number one on the Hot Rap Tracks chart, while Luv U Better and Work It hit number one on the R&B charts.

== Track listing ==
1. Act a Fool - Ludacris
2. Beautiful - Snoop Dogg, Pharrell Williams and Charlie Wilson
3. Thugz Mansion - 2Pac and Anthony Hamilton
4. Air Force Ones - Kyjuan, Murphy Lee and Nelly
5. The Jump Off - Lil' Kim and Mr. Cheeks
6. Can't Let You Go - Fabolous, Lil' Mo and Mike Shorey
7. Rock the Party - Benzino and Mario Winans
8. Where the Hood At? - DMX
9. Never Scared - Bone Crusher, Busta Rhymes and Jadakiss
10. Like a Pimp - David Banner and Lil' Flip
11. Mesmerize - Ashanti and Ja Rule
12. Luv U Better - LL Cool J
13. Beware of the Boys [Jay-Z Remix] - Jay-Z and Panjabi MC
14. Work It - Missy Elliott
15. Untouchables - Benzino ft. The Untouchables
