= The Source Presents: Hip Hop Hits, Vol. 3 =

Compilation album by Various artists
- Released: November 30, 1999
- Recorded: Various times
- Genre: Hip hop, rap, mainstream urban
- Length: 1 hour, 7 minutes, 47 seconds
- Label: Def Jam Recordings

The Source chronology
The Source Hip Hop Music Awards 1999 (1999)	The Source Presents: Hip Hop Hits, Vol. 3 (1999)	The Source Hip Hop Music Awards 2000 (2000)

Professional ratings
Review scores
Source	Rating
Allmusic	3/5 stars

The Source Presents: Hip Hop Hits, Volume 3 is the third annual music compilation album to be contributed by The Source magazine. Released November 30, 1999 and distributed by Def Jam Recordings, Hip Hop Hits Volume 3 features seventeen hip hop and rap hits. It went to number 29 on the Top R&B/Hip Hop Albums chart and peaked at number 45 on the Billboard 200 album chart.

This is the second album in Hip Hop Hits series that does not feature an R&B/Hip Hop or a pop hit in the number-one position, but two tracks, "Jamboree" and "Who Dat" reached number one on the Hot Rap Tracks chart.

== Track listing ==
1. Holla Holla - Ja Rule
2. Quiet Storm - Mobb Deep
3. Hate Me Now - Nas (Feat. P. Diddy)
4. Tommy's Theme - Made Men (Feat. The LOX)
5. Watch Out Now - The Beatnuts
6. Ha [Remix] - Juvenile (Feat. Jay-Z)
7. Watch Out for the Hook (Dungeon Family Mix) - Cool Breeze (Feat. Goodie Mob, OutKast & Witchdoctor)
8. Slippin' - DMX
9. Hard Knock Life (Ghetto Anthem) - Jay-Z
10. Guilty Conscience - Eminem (Feat. Dr. Dre)
11. Tear It Off - Method Man (Feat. Redman)
12. Who Dat - JT Money (Feat. Solé)
13. Nann Nigga - Trick Daddy (Feat. Trina)
14. Simon Says - Pharoahe Monch
15. What Ya Want - Eve (Feat. Nokio the N-Tity & Ruff Ryders)
16. Jamboree - Naughty by Nature (Feat. Zhané)
17. Hoody Hooo - TRU
