= Mini Bus (On the Telephone) =

Single by Barrington Levy
- B-side: "Red Eye"
- Released: April 21, 1984
- Genre: Reggae, dancehall, dub
- Length: 6:30
- Label: Kingdom
- Songwriter(s): Metro Station
- Producer(s): Leache Dread

"Mini Bus" is a song by Jamaican dub, reggae, and dancehall artist Barrington Levy. It was released first as a single in 1984 as a 45 on 12-inch vinyl. Subsequently, it was released on CD in 1990 as the ninth track on the compilation album Broader than Broadway.

== Track listing ==
UK Vinyl Single

1. "Mini Bus" - 6:30
2. "Red Eye" - 6:00

Broader Than Broadway

1. "Shake It" [The Lindbergh Palace Remix] - 6:25
2. "Here I Come (Broader Than Broadway)" - 3:39
3. "Under Me Sensi" - 4:32
4. "Teach The Youth" - 3:36
5. "Prison Oval Rock" - 4:07
6. "Shine Eye Girl - 2:49
7. "Bounty Hunter - 3:48
8. "The Vibes Is Right - 4:14
9. "Too Experienced - 3:20
10. "Minibus (On The Telephone) - 3:21
11. "Money Move - 3:20
12. "She's Mine - 3:53
13. "You Have Caught Me - 3:39
14. "Here I Come" [1990 Remix] - 5:38

== Influences ==
The song features certain syntactical and structural influences from the song Hush, Little Baby.

== Release history ==
Region	Date	Label
United Kingdom (Vinyl)	April 21, 1984	Kingdom
United States (CD, Compilation)	August 30, 1990	Profile Records
