= The Source Presents: Hip Hop Hits, Vol. 9 =

Compilation album by Various artists
- Released: December 7, 2004
- Recorded: Various times
- Genre: Hip hop, rap, mainstream urban
- Length: unknown
- Label: Image Entertainment

The Source chronology
The Source Presents: Hip Hop Hits, Vol. 8 (2004)	The Source Presents: Hip Hop Hits, Vol. 9 (2004)	The Source Presents: Hip Hop Hits, Vol. 10 (2005)

Professional ratings
Review scores
Source	Rating
Allmusic	2.5/5 stars

The Source Presents: Hip Hop Hits, Volume 9 is the ninth annual music compilation album to be contributed by The Source magazine. Released December 7, 2004, and distributed by Image Entertainment, Hip Hop Hits Volume 9 features sixteen hip hop and rap hits (one of them being the bonus track). It went to number 36 on the Top R&B/Hip Hop Albums chart and number 75 on the Billboard 200 album chart. It is also one of only two Hip Hop Hits albums to be released in the same year; Volume 8 was released six months earlier.

Two songs peaked number one on the Hot Rap Tracks chart: Overnight Celebrity and Slow Motion (which was a number one pop hit). It is the sixth compilation not to feature a number-one R&B/Hip Hop hit.

== Track listing ==
1. Game Over - Lil' Flip
2. Locked Up - Akon
3. Slow Motion - Juvenile and Soulja Slim
4. Blow It Out - Ludacris
5. Welcome Back - Mase
6. Freek-A-Leek - Petey Pablo
7. I Like That - Chingy, Nate Dogg and Houston
8. No Better Love - Rell and Young Gunz
9. Overnight Celebrity - Twista
10. Selfish - John Legend, Slum Village and Kanye West
11. Got It Twisted - Mobb Deep
12. Bottles & Up - Benzino
13. No Problem - Lil' Scrappy
14. Bring It Back - Mannie Fresh and Lil' Wayne
15. Rubberband Man - T.I.
16. Don't Hate - Benzino and Faheim
