= David Mays =

American music journalist

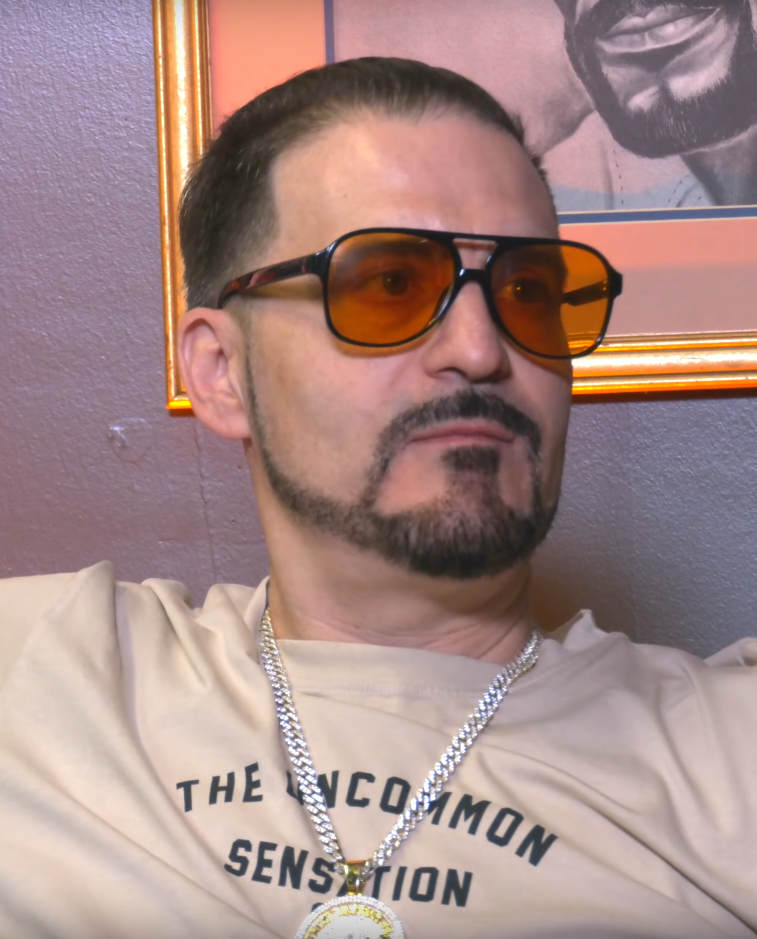
- David Mays in 2021
- Born: 1969 (age 56–57)
- Occupations: Entrepreneur; media executive
- Years active: 1988–present
- Known for: Founder of The Source

David Mays is an American media executive and entrepreneur who founded The Source Magazine and co-founded Hip Hop Weekly. He is the co-founder of Breakbeat Media, a multimedia podcast network launched in September 2021 that is dedicated to serving the interests and perspectives of the hip-hop community across the globe.

Mays created The Source in 1988 as a single-sheet newsletter while a Harvard undergraduate. It soon became a national magazine.

While at Harvard, Mays co-hosted a radio show on WHRB, Street Beat, using the name "Go-Go Dave." Mays' co-host was Jon Shecter, "J the Sultan of Rap." Mays made Shecter a partner in The Source, which provided news and information on hip-hop to listeners of the radio show. After graduation, Mays and Shecter brought The Source to New York, with classmate Ed Young and Harvard Law School graduate James Bernard as additional partners.

Mays, as publisher, guided the rapid growth of the magazine, fostering its role as the champion of and critical voice for hip-hop culture. The Source's “5 Mics” album rating system became the standard by which all hip-hop albums were measured. The magazine's "Unsigned Hype" column was responsible for discovering and helping launch the careers of The Notorious B.I.G, Common, Mobb Deep, DMX, and many more artists who would go on to become stars. In 1991, Mays created The Source Awards, which started as a feature on the TV show Yo! MTV Raps, and later became an independent annual production with some of the highest-rated TV specials for a hip-hop audience ever with the UPN Network and then on BET.

Mays partnered with the mayor and city of Miami to host a weekend of entertainment and community activities, in conjunction with The Source Awards in August 2004, that attracted over 50,000 attendees. The Source Awards Weekend generated over $50 million in tourist revenue for the city.

Mays built a stable of companies around The Source brand, including a compilation album series (The Source Presents: Hip Hop Hits), two weekly TV shows (The Source All Access, The Source Sound Lab), a mobile content download business and a clothing line, as well as foreign-language editions of the magazine: The Source France, The Source Japan and The Source Latino. Mays was the first entrepreneur to introduce hip-hop to Madison Avenue, opening the doors for Nike, Mountain Dew and other corporate brands to begin marketing to the hip-hop consumer.

In 1999, Mays created The Source Youth Foundation, which raised over $1 million to fund programs and organizations across the country using Hip-Hop to effectively reach at-risk, inner-city youth. Mays co-created the first national hip-hop political summit ("A Special Summit on Social Responsibility in the Hip-Hop Industry") in 2000 with the Reverend Al Sharpton and the National Action Network.
