= Hip Hop Weekly =

American magazine

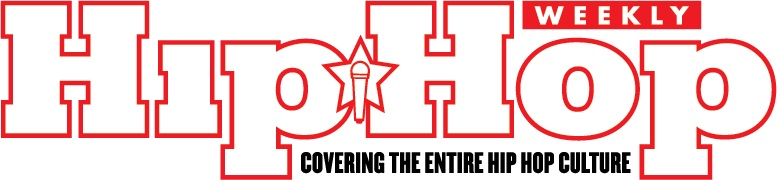
- Editor-in-Chief: Tiffany Muller
- Categories: News & Entertainment Magazine
- Frequency: 4 issues per year
- First issue: 2006
- Company: CJB Investments
- Country: United States
- Based in: Phoenix, AZ
- Language: English
- Website: hiphopweekly.com
- ISSN: 1932-5177

Hip Hop Weekly is an American hip hop news and entertainment magazine founded in 2006. The magazine covers celebrity news, music, film, fashion, sports and features exclusive interviews with many notable figures within popular culture.

== History ==
Hip Hop Weekly was founded in 2006 by Ray "Benzino" Scott (The Source magazine, Love & Hip-Hop: Atlanta) and Dave Mays (co-founder of The Source). In an interview with the New York Observer, Mays said he and Scott came up with the idea after noticing the success of magazines such as Entertainment Weekly and US Weekly and wanted to fill the void that existed for weekly hip hop news. Prominent celebrity journalist/editor Cynthia Horner known for her legacy with Right On! Magazine was the first editor-in-chief of the publication.

Published quarterly, the magazine offers the latest news to millions of young Americans who identify with the hip hop culture. On September 13, 2016, Hip Hop Weekly was acquired for an undisclosed amount by CJB Investments LLC.

== Special releases ==
Over the years, Hip Hop Weekly has released special issues that either commemorate a special moment in pop culture history or highlight icons of urban music. These collector's edition releases include special issues honoring the lives of Michael Jackson and Whitney Houston, "Behind the Mic" docuzines on Jay Z, Beyoncé, and Lil Wayne among others. In 2010, the magazine released a special 3-D swimsuit issue. Later that year, another 3-D issue was released to commemorate the 100th issue of Hip Hop Weekly.
