= Bad Boyz =

Single by Barrington Levy and Shyne

Single by Shyne featuring Barrington Levy

from the album Shyne
- B-side: "Bonnie & Shyne"
- Released: May 27, 2000
- Recorded: 1999
- Genre: East Coast hip hop; Gangsta rap
- Length: 4:34
- Label: Bad Boy; Arista
- Songwriters: Jamal Barrow; L.J. Porter; Barrington Levy; David Bowie; Jim Osterberg
- Producer: Ez Elpee

Shyne singles chronology
| "Bad Boyz" (2000) | "That's Gangsta" (2000) |

Barrington Levy singles chronology
| "Top of the World" (2000) | "Bad Boyz" (2000) | "Bonnie & Shyne" (2001) |

"Bad Boyz" is the lead single released from Shyne's eponymous debut album, Shyne (2000). The song was produced by Ez Elpee and featured reggae artist Barrington Levy. The song includes a sample from "Nightclubbin" by Grace Jones.

To date, "Bad Boyz" is Shyne's most successful single, having peaked at number 57 on the Billboard Hot 100, his only single to reach the Hot 100. It found more success on the Billboard Hot R&B/Hip-Hop Singles & Tracks and Hot Rap Singles, reaching number 9 and 11 on the charts respectively. The song would later appear on compilations like The Source Presents: Hip Hop Hits, Vol. 4 (2000), Music Inspired by Scarface (2003), and Bad Boy 20th Anniversary Box Set Edition (2016).

== Music video ==
Directed by Marc Klasfeld, the video starts off with the caption: Rae Town, Jamaica 9:37 am, with Shyne exiting Norman Manley International Airport and heading to town. It later consists of scenes where viewers see the community of Rae Town and the people surrounding it and Shyne and Barrington Levy hanging out with them throughout the day and into the late night at a party. Later scenes showed Shyne in the back of a car riding through Times Square.

== Track listing ==
US 12" Vinyl

1. "Bad Boyz" (Club Mix) – 4:24
2. "Bad Boyz" (Instrumental) – 4:30
3. "Bad Boyz" (Radio Edit) – 3:54
4. "Bad Boyz" (Instrumental) – 4:30

Europe CD single

1. "Bad Boyz" (Radio Mix) – 4:19
2. "Bad Boyz" (Club Mix) – 4:19
3. "Bad Boyz" (Instrumental) – 4:30
4. "Bonnie & Shyne" (Radio Mix) – 3:57
5. "Bonnie & Shyne" (Club Mix) – 4:17

== Chart performance ==
=== Weekly charts ===
| Chart (2000) | Peak position |
|---|---|
| US Billboard Hot 100 | 57 |
| US Hot R&B/Hip-Hop Songs (Billboard) | 9 |
| US Hot Rap Songs (Billboard) | 11 |

=== Year-end charts ===
| End of year chart (2000) | Position |
|---|---|
| US Hot R&B/Hip-Hop Singles & Tracks (Billboard) | 62 |
| US Hot Rap Singles (Billboard) | 39 |
