= Bonnie & Shyne =

2001 song performed by Shyne

Single by Shyne featuring Barrington Levy

from the album Shyne
- A-side: "Bad Boyz"
- Released: 2001
- Recorded: 1999
- Genre: Hip hop, reggae fusion
- Length: 4:17
- Label: Bad Boy; Arista
- Songwriters: J. Barrow; C. Thompson; B. Levy; M. David; E. Gassion; L. Guglielmi
- Producer: Chucky Thompson

Shyne singles chronology
"That's Gangsta" (2000)	"Bonnie & Shyne" (2001)

Barrington Levy singles chronology
"Bad Boyz" (2000)	"Bonnie & Shyne" (2001)

Music video
- "Bonnie & Shyne" on YouTube

"Bonnie & Shyne" is the 3rd and final single released from Shyne's eponymous debut album. The song was produced by Chucky Thompson and features vocals from reggae artist Barrington Levy, his second collaboration with Levy (the first being "Bad Boyz"). The song contains a sample from "La Vie En Rose" by Grace Jones, this was his second time sampling from Jones (the first being "Nightclubbin").

The song only managed to chart on the Billboard Hot R&B/Hip-Hop Singles & Tracks at number 57. It would later appear on compilation albums like The Source Hip Hop Music Awards 2001 and Bad Boy 20th Anniversary Box Set Edition.

== Music video ==
The video, directed by Chris Robinson, aired February 5, 2001. The video starts in a New York tenement apartment where Shyne is seen with a woman in bed. Afterwards, voices are heard and the front door is broken down by F.B.I. agents as they release smoke canisters and Shyne attempts to get out of the room. It then flashbacks to Shyne watching said woman from his car as he gets out to talk to her and give her his #. The relationship starts out smoothly with both of them hanging outside his tenement and going inside as they fall in love. Later on, Shyne is being harassed by an F.B.I. agent (played by Dean Winters; inspired by Gary Oldman's character Norman "Stan" Stansfield from Léon: The Professional) while at the same time the woman is pulled over by F.B.I. agents. It goes back to the beginning of the video where F.B.I. agents is preparing a raid on the tenement as the lead F.B.I. agent orders the team to make their way up the building. Shyne makes his way out through the window as the agents enter the room and escapes through use of the ladder and runs from the building as he gets 1 last look of the woman, as she gets taken by the F.B.I. agents.

== Track listing ==
1. "Bad Boyz" – 4:34
2. "Bad Boyz" (Radio Edit) – 3:51
3. "Bad Boyz" (Instrumental) – 4:31
4. "Bonnie & Shyne" (Radio Edit) – 3:57
5. "Bonnie & Shyne" – 4:17

== Charts ==
Chart (2001)	Peak position
US Hot R&B/Hip-Hop Singles & Tracks (Billboard)	57
