= Godfather Buried Alive =

Studio album by Shyne
- Released: August 10, 2004
- Recorded: 2002–2004
- Genres: Hip hop, gangsta rap
- Length: 52:36
- Labels: Gangland; Def Jam
- Producers: Brian "All Day" Miller; Buckwild; Charlemagne; Chucky Thompson; Irv Gotti; Just Blaze; Kanye West; Mike Dean; Shyne; Swizz Beatz; Yogi

Shyne chronology
Shyne (2000)	Godfather Buried Alive (2004)	Gangland (2012)

Singles from Godfather Buried Alive
- 1. "More or Less" Released: 2004; 2. "Jimmy Choo" Released: 2004

Professional ratings
Aggregate scores
Source	Rating
Metacritic	54/100
Review scores
Source	Rating
AllMusic	2.5/5 stars
Blender	2/5 stars
Entertainment Weekly	B+
HipHopDX	3/5 stars
Los Angeles Times	2.5/4 stars
NME	5/10
Pitchfork	6.9/10
Q	2/5 stars
RapReviews	7/10
Rolling Stone	3/5 stars

Godfather Buried Alive is the second studio album by Belizean-American rapper Shyne. It was released on August 10, 2004 by Gangland Records and Def Jam Recordings. It was released during Shyne's 10-year prison sentence for a 1999 nightclub shooting in New York City. The album included 13 tracks, 12 of which were previously recorded vocals, while one was recorded over the phone from jail. It features guest appearances from Kurupt, Nate Dogg, Foxy Brown and Ashanti, and production from Kanye West, Swizz Beatz, Mike Dean and Just Blaze, among others. The album debuted at number three on the Billboard 200 with 158,000 copies sold in its first week, making Shyne the second rapper after 2Pac to have an album debut within the top five of the Billboard 200 while incarcerated.

== Background ==
After the release of his debut album in September 2000, Shyne was sentenced to 10 years in prison in June 2001 and released from his contract with Bad Boy Entertainment. A bidding war ensued, with numerous labels meeting with Shyne in prison and offering him contracts. Shyne eventually signed a $3 million contract with Def Jam Records, and plans were made to release his second studio album. Due to the fact Shyne was unable to professionally record new music while in prison, the album was largely composed of music he had recorded prior to his incarceration. Certain lines, however, were recorded over a prison phone. The only song fully recorded from prison was "For the Record", a diss track recorded over the phone and made in response to 50 Cent dissing Shyne on Hot 97 during a freestyle.

== Track listing ==
#	Title	Producer(s)	Featured Guest(s)	Time	Samples
1	Buried Alive Intro	Moses Leviy		0:19	
2	Quasi O.G.	Buckwild		4:25	"No More Trouble" as performed by Bob Marley & The Wailers
3	More or Less	Kanye West, Brian "All Day" Miller	Foxy Brown	4:37	"Rose" performed by Lamont Dozier
4	Behind the Walls (East Coast Gangsta Mix)	Mike Dean	Kurupt & Nate Dogg	4:29	
5	S.H.Y.N.E.	Swizz Beatz	Swizz Beatz, Mashonda	4:30	"La Di Da Di" performed by Slick Rick and Doug E. Fresh
6	For the Record	Moses Leviy		4:55	"Friends" performed by Whodini; "For The Record"; "Here I Go" written by Leroy Edwards and Michael Tyler
7	Martyr	Moses Leviy & Chucky Thompson		3:53	
8	Jimmy Choo	Irv Gotti	Ashanti	3:43	
9	Godfather	Yogi		4:00	
10	The Gang	Moses Leviy & Chucky Thompson	Foxy Brown	4:18	"I Did It For Love" written by Terry Etlinger and Linda Laurie; "If You Think It" written by David Porter and Ronnie Williams; "Verbal Intercourse" as performed by Raekwon featuring Nas & Ghostface Killah
11	Edge	Charlemagne		4:15	
12	Here with Me	Just Blaze		4:36	
13	Diamonds & Mac 10's	Just Blaze		4:38	"Falling Tears" performed by Morris Albert

== Chart performance ==
=== Weekly charts ===
Chart (2004)	Peak position
US Billboard 200	3
US Top R&B/Hip-Hop Albums (Billboard)	1

=== Year-end charts ===
Chart (2004)	Position
US Billboard 200	182
US Top R&B/Hip-Hop Albums (Billboard)	55
