= That's Gangsta (Shyne song) =

Single by Shyne

from the album Shyne
- Released: October 10, 2000
- Recorded: 2000
- Genre: Gangsta rap
- Length: 3:43
- Label: Bad Boy; Arista
- Songwriters: Jamal Barrow; Sean Combs; Mario Winans; Leon Sylvers
- Producers: P. Diddy; Mario "Yellow Man" Winans

Shyne singles chronology
"Bad Boyz" (2000)	"That's Gangsta" (2000)	"Bonnie & Shyne" (2001)

"That's Gangsta" is the second single released from Shyne's eponymous debut album. The song was produced by fellow Bad Boy labelmates P. Diddy and Mario Winans. The song includes samples from "Misdemeanor" by Foster Sylvers and "It's Funky Enough" by The D.O.C. (who also appears in the music video).

The song failed to appear on the Billboard Hot 100 but was able to find minor success on the Billboard Hot R&B/Hip-Hop Singles & Tracks and Hot Rap Singles, reaching number 58 and 28 on the charts respectively.

== Music video ==
Directed by Marc Klasfeld (who had previously directed Shyne's first video "Bad Boyz"), the video gives a slice-of-life look at the Brooklyn scene with Shyne waking up from his bed, getting dressed and taking with him a bag carrying unknown contents out of the house as the viewers see his family and how they live. He goes to a laundromat where he spots an elderly woman and leaves the bag in a cart for her to take. The bag is revealed to have huge amounts of money as she empties it. As he gets out, a car pulls up near the laundromat where a man carrying a full brown paper bag gives it to Shyne, implying that he's his client/customer of sorts. He takes the brown paper bag to an undisclosed location where he interrupts a dominoes game by throwing the bag onto the table. At first, a confrontation between Shyne and one of men in the crowd is about to commence but instead, they embrace in a hug with the bag's contents containing hundreds of dollars in cash.

Throughout the video there a scenes of people that make up the community: from a prostitute, a boxer, a father-to-be with a pregnant girlfriend, F.B.I. officers and the people they have under arrest, looking into the camera as they say the aforementioned title.

== Track listing ==
- CD
1. "That's Gangsta" (Radio Mix) – 3:42
2. "That's Gangsta" (Instrumental) – 3:43
3. "Call Out Research Hook" – 0:10
- 12"
1. "That's Gangsta" (Club Mix) – 4:05
2. "That's Gangsta" (Instrumental) – 4:05
3. "That's Gangsta" (Radio Mix) – 4:05
4. "That's Gangsta" (Instrumental) – 4:05

== Chart performance ==
=== Weekly charts ===
Chart (2000)	Peak position
US Hot R&B/Hip-Hop Songs (Billboard)	58
US Hot Rap Songs (Billboard)	28
