= The Source Presents: Hip Hop Hits =

Compilation album by Various artists
- Released: December 16, 1997
- Recorded: 1994−97
- Genres: Hip hop; mainstream urban
- Length: 1:15:07
- Label: Polygram Records

The Source chronology
The Source Presents: Hip Hop Hits (1997)	The Source Presents: Hip Hop Hits, Vol. 2 (1998)

Professional ratings
Review scores
Source	Rating
AllMusic	3/5 stars

The Source Presents: Hip Hop Hits is the first annual music compilation album to be contributed by The Source magazine. Released on December 16, 1997, and distributed through Polygram Records, Hip Hop Hits: Volume 1 features eighteen hip hop and rap hits. Five tracks on the album had reached number-one on the Billboard Hot Rap Tracks chart: "Bow Down," "Can't Nobody Hold Me Down", "Crush on You," "Elevators" and "Hypnotize". Two of the songs, "Hypnotize" and "Can't Nobody Hold Me Down" reached number-one on the Billboard R&B/Hip-Hop and pop charts.

== Commercial performance ==
It went to number 25 on the Top R&B/Hip Hop Albums chart (making it the highest charting Hip Hop Hits album on that chart to date) and peaked at number 38 on the Billboard 200 albums chart.

== Track listing ==
No.	Title	Writer(s)	Producer(s)	Length
1.	"Hypnotize" (performed by The Notorious B.I.G.)	Christopher Wallace; Sean Combs; Deric Angelettie; Ron Lawrence; Andy Armer; Randy Alpert	D-Dot; Ron "Amen-Ra" Lawrence; Sean "Puffy" Combs^{[a]}	3:49
2.	"Triumph" (performed by Wu-Tang Clan)	Wu-Tang Clan	RZA	5:38
3.	"Look Into My Eyes" (performed by Bone Thugs-n-Harmony)	Anthony Henderson; Ernie Isley; Marvin Isley; O'Kelly Isley Jr.; Ronald Isley; Rudolph Isley; Chris Jasper; Steven Howse; Bryon McCane; Charles Scruggs	DJ U-Neek	4:19
4.	"Da Joint" (performed by EPMD)	Parrish Smith; Dana Stinson; Erick Sermon; James Brown	Erick Sermon; Rockwilder	3:27
5.	"Can't Nobody Hold Me Down" (performed by Puff Daddy and Mase)	Combs; Mason Betha; Carlos Broady; Nashiem Myrick	Sean "Puffy" Combs; 6 July; Nashiem Myrick	5:10
6.	"Bout It, Bout It" (performed by Master P and Mia X)	Percy Miller	Beats By The Pound	5:31
7.	"Front Lines (Hell on Earth)" (performed by Mobb Deep)	Albert Johnson; Kejuan Muchita	Mobb Deep	4:34
8.	"Mary Jane" (performed by Scarface)	Brad Jordan	N.O. Joe; Scarface; Mike Dean; Tone Capone	4:41
9.	"Big Bad Mamma" (performed by Foxy Brown and Dru Hill)	Shawn Carter; Samuel Barnes; Jean-Claude Olivier; Leon Haywood	Trackmasters	3:53
10.	"Firm Biz" (performed by The Firm)	Nasir Jones; Anthony Cruz; Inga Merchand; Leshawn Lewis; Mary Brockert; Allen McGrier	L.E.S.	3:50
11.	"Bow Down" (performed by Westside Connection)	O'Shea Jackson; Dedrick Rolison; William Calhoun Jr.	Bud'da	3:27
12.	"Whateva Man" (performed by Redman)	Reggie Noble; Erick Sermon	Erick Sermon	3:08
13.	"Elevators (Me & You)" (performed by OutKast)	André Benjamin; Antwan Patton	OutKast	4:25
14.	"Crush on You" (performed by Lil' Kim and Lil' Cease)	Kimberly Jones; Betha; Wallace; Cameron Giles; Jeff Lorber	Andreao "Fanatic" Heard	4:32
15.	"I'll Be" (performed by Foxy Brown and Jay-Z)	Shawn Carter; Jean-Claude Olivier; Samuel Barnes; Angela Winbush; René Moore; Bobby Watson; Bruce Swedien	Trackmasters	3:00
16.	"We Trying to Stay Alive" (performed by Wyclef Jean and Refugee Camp All-Stars)	Nel Jean; Pras Michel; Robin Gibb; Barry Gibb; Maurice Gibb; John Forté	Jerry 'Wonder' Duplessis; Wyclef Jean; Pras Michel	3:11
17.	"Phenomenon" (performed by LL Cool J)	James Todd Smith; Lawrence; Combs; William Withers; Stanley McKenney	Sean "Puffy" Combs; Ron "Amen-Ra" Lawrence	4:12
18.	"Hay" (performed by Crucial Conflict)	Wondosas Martin; Marrico King; Corey Johnson; Ralph Leverston	Wildstyle	4:20
Total length:				1:15:07

Notes

- ^{^[a]} signifies a co-producer.
