= Shyne =

Belizean rapper and politician (born 1978)

The Honourable Moses Barrow
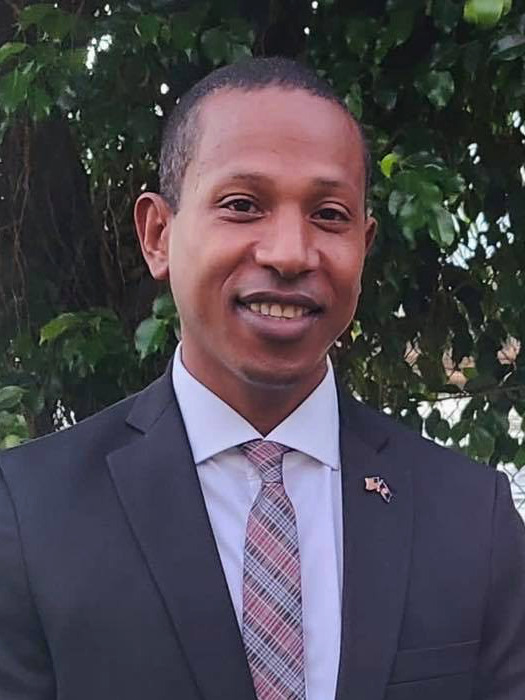
- Shyne in 2021

Leader of the Opposition
- In office February 1, 2022 – March 14, 2025
- Prime Minister: Johnny Briceño
- Preceded by: Patrick Faber
- Succeeded by: Tracy Panton
- In office June 25, 2021 – September 16, 2021
- Prime Minister: Johnny Briceño
- Preceded by: Patrick Faber
- Succeeded by: Patrick Faber

Member of the House of Representatives for Mesopotamia
- In office November 11, 2020 – March 12, 2025
- Preceded by: Michael Finnegan
- Succeeded by: Lee Mark Chang

Personal details
- Born: Jamal Michael Barrow; November 8, 1978 (age 48) Belize City, Belize
- Party: United Democratic
- Occupation: Rapper; songwriter; politician
- Nickname: Shyne
- Musical career
- Origin: Brooklyn, New York City, U.S.
- Genre: Hip-hop
- Years active: 1996–present
- Labels: Gangland; Def Jam; Bad Boy; Arista

Moses Michael Levi Barrow (born Jamal Michael Barrow; November 8, 1978), best known by his stage name Shyne, is a Belizean politician and former rapper. He served as Leader of the Opposition in the House of Representatives, and the leader of the Belize United Democratic Party.

Barrow was born in Belize City but moved to New York City as a child and began to rap as an adolescent. His most commercially recognized 2000 singles include "Bad Boyz" and "Bonnie & Shyne" (both featuring Barrington Levy). He contributed to albums by artists including the Notorious B.I.G.'s posthumous Born Again, Mase's Double Up, Sean Combs's Forever, Usher's Confessions, and Lil Wayne's Tha Carter IV.

Shyne and his mother lived in the Brooklyn neighborhood of East Flatbush, where after being discovered freestyling in a barbershop, he became a rapper. On the verge of releasing his debut album under Combs' Bad Boy Records, on the evening of December 27, 1999, he went to a New York City nightclub with Combs and Jennifer Lopez. An argument broke out in the club between Combs and another man; gunshots followed with three bystanders injured. In June 2001, he was convicted of assault and unlawful possession of a weapon, and sentenced to 10 years in prison. His eponymous debut album was released in September 2000, going gold the following month. He continued to record music while incarcerated, eventually releasing his sophomore studio album, Godfather Buried Alive, under Def Jam Recordings in 2004.

While serving his prison sentence, Shyne became interested in Judaism, becoming observant – practicing Orthodox Judaism, and officially changed his name to Moses Michael Levi Barrow in 2006. After he was released from prison in late 2009, he was deported to Belize. In 2010, he moved to Jerusalem, where he spent his time studying the Torah up to 12 hours a day. He returned to Belize in 2013, where he was appointed Belize Music and Goodwill Ambassador with a mandate to support the national music industry.

Shyne was elected to the Belizean House of Representatives in the 2020 general election, as a member of the center-right United Democratic Party. He served as Leader of the Opposition and leader of the United Democratic Party between June and September 2021, and again from February 2022.

A documentary about his life, The Honorable Shyne, was released by Hulu/Andscape in November 2024.

== Early life ==
Shyne was born Jamal Michael Barrow, in Belize City, to mother Frances Imeon Myvette and father Dean Barrow, who were not married. Shyne's mother is the sister of Michael Myvett, going by the surname Finnegan, one of Dean Barrow's long-time political colleagues in Belize. Barrow's middle name comes from his uncle. After his conversion to Judaism, Barrow claimed that his maternal grandmother, Esme Diaz, was Beta Israel and had emigrated from Ethiopia to Belize. However, in other interviews Barrow has stated that Diaz was a Garifuna woman from Honduras.

As a child, Barrow lived with his mother in Brooklyn, New York City, and at times with his father in Belize. Dean Barrow, a lawyer and politician, later became the first Black Prime Minister of Belize of Belize in 2008. Barrow's mother moved to the United States when he was three years old, leaving her son between the care of her brother, Michael, and his father's sister, Denise, in Belize City. His father was in a relationship with another woman, and Barrow recalls: "The nigga said his two other kids were made out of love. It was devastating."

At age seven, Barrow moved to Brooklyn to live with his mother, residing in Crown Heights and later East Flatbush. His mother supported the family through domestic work, and Barrow spent summers with his father in Belize. After he moved to Brooklyn, he began to develop a strong interest in the hip-hop culture of the 1980s and 1990s. At age 15, Barrow was shot in the shoulder during a fight in Flatbush, an injury that left a lasting scar.

After graduating high school three years later, part of the time of which he spent attending high school in Belize at Wesley College in 1993, he enrolled in a New York City College of Technology computer program. He paid for his tuition by working as a bike messenger, buying an 18-speed bicycle and riding it from Brooklyn over the Brooklyn Bridge into Manhattan, where he made deliveries around the borough. He left NYC College of Technology to pursue a career in music.

== Music career ==
=== 1997–99: Career beginnings ===
In 1997, he began his rap career after being courted by music manager Don Pooh. In 1998, while Barrow was freestyling in a barbershop on Church Avenue in Brooklyn, he was discovered by hip hop producer DJ Clark Kent, who was working on the Notorious B.I.G.'s first posthumous album, Born Again. After freestyling in front of several friends and music promoters, his manager submitted him to executives and labels including Chris Lighty of Violator, Sylvia Rhone of East West/Elektra Records, Jimmy Iovine of Interscope Records, Lyor Cohen of Def Jam Recordings and Bryan Turner of Priority Records, but hip hop entrepreneur Sean Combs (also known as Puff Daddy or P. Diddy) offered Shyne a five-album contract with Bad Boy Records. Media reports at the time described his contract with Bad Boy Records as highly lucrative. He later appeared on Mase's second album, Double Up (1999), and on remixes of Total's "Sittin' at Home" and 112's "Anywhere", and on Combs' album, Forever (1999).

=== 2000: Debut studio album ===
On September 26, 2000, his self-titled debut studio album was released. It debuted at number five on the Billboard 200. The Recording Industry Association of America (RIAA) later certified the album gold. The album produced three singles: "Bad Boyz", "Bonnie & Shyne", and "That's Gangsta." The first two featured Jamaican singer Barrington Levy. Additional contributions included vocals by Slim of 112 and production from Bad Boy's in-house producers, The Hitmen. The album was recorded before his arrest following the December 1999 nightclub shooting.

The album received mixed reviews from critics, due to comparisons between Shyne and the deceased Notorious B.I.G., which would also start a rift between the former and the latter's affiliate group, Junior M.A.F.I.A. In 1999, after a studio session at Daddy's House, Shyne was reportedly shot at by associates of Junior M.A.F.I.A. member Lil' Cease. Following the incident, he began carrying a firearm for protection. Cease's former cohort, Lil' Kim, also dissed Shyne on her second album's title track, "The Notorious K.I.M." (2000), ridiculing his comparisons to Biggie.

=== 2002–04: Godfather Buried Alive ===
In 2002, after beginning his incarceration, Shyne parted ways with Bad Boy and ended all contact with Combs soon after. While incarcerated at Clinton Correctional Facility, Shyne reportedly received offers from labels including Irv Gotti's Murder Inc. Records and James Prince's Rap-A-Lot Records, but declined them. The rapper ultimately signed with Def Jam for a $3 million contract. The deal was completed on April 20, 2004.

On August 10, 2004, Shyne released his second studio album, Godfather Buried Alive, while imprisoned. The album, partially recorded prior to imprisonment and partially during his imprisonment over a jail phone, sold 434,000 copies. It debuted at number three on the Billboard 200 and number one on Billboard's Top R&B/Hip-Hop album chart. His incarceration limited the album's promotion, as he was unable to tour or make media appearances. His former bodyguard and longtime friend, Anthony "Wolf" Jones, was listed as the album's executive producer; Jones was shot and killed on November 11, 2003, during an altercation with Black Mafia Family leader Demetrius "Big Meech" Flenory.

=== 2010–12: Continued music, feuds and indefinite hiatus ===
On February 16, 2010, four months after his release from prison and deportation to Belize, Shyne signed a new deal with Def Jam Records.

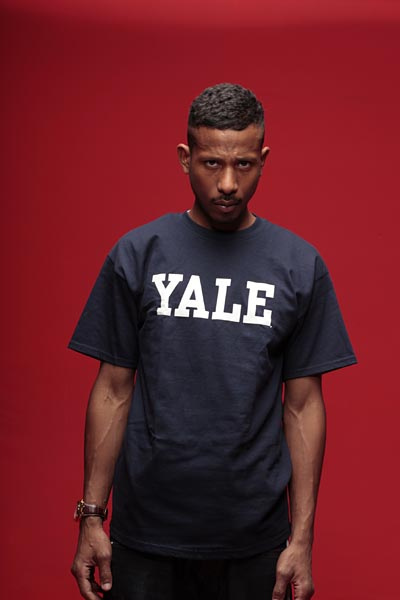
Shyne in 2010

After a trip to Jerusalem, later in 2010, where he formally converted to Orthodox Judaism and underwent a symbolic circumcision, Shyne collaborated with Jewish-American reggae and rock musician Matisyahu on his single, "Messiah", released in April. He also released "Roller Song" that same year. He later announced that he was recording two albums that were planned for release throughout 2010, after Def Jam approached him to sign a distribution agreement. Messiah was set to be the first of his 2010 release schedule, while Gangland, was set to be his second. In October 2010, Shyne criticized Def Jam and announced hopes of signing to Cash Money Records: "I'm definitely trying to get with Cash Money… I'm not signed to Def Jam anyway, I just need to find another distributor. I might just have Cash Money do everything. Who knows? That's the beauty about being in the business for yourself. You can decide where you want to go and what you want to do." Though he blamed former Def Jam CEO L.A. Reid for his frustration, he later issued an apology. In November 2010, Cash Money co-founder Bryan "Birdman" Williams said that Shyne's deportation had stalled his planned Cash Money deal, as it prevented him from appearing in the United States.

In 2011, he performed in Jerusalem, forming a collaboration with Matisyahu. Shyne made a surprise guest appearance at a concert, performing with Matisyahu and HaDag Nachash at Jerusalem's Kikar Safra on June 23. He rapped during Matisyahu's set for "King Without a Crown". He shouted "Free Jonathan Pollard, free Gilad Shalit" to applause before exiting the stage. Matisyahu and Shyne discussed collaborating more frequently in the future, but never happened.

Shyne appeared on the outro of Lil Wayne's album, Tha Carter IV alongside Bun B, Nas and Busta Rhymes. In December 2011, Shyne said signing to Cash Money Records was "still a possibility". In March 2012, Shyne and Diddy reconciled. The two were photographed together at Fashion Week in Paris; Diddy tweeted, "Me and Shyne Po front row at Kenzo #ParisIsBurning RT to da world!!!!", and Shyne said: "It's a new day. L'chaim!"

On September 26, 2012, the day of the twelfth anniversary of his debut album's release, Shyne released Gangland, as a mixtape. It had been downloaded more than 100,000 times on DatPiff. Shyne called out Rick Ross, due to his blasphemous Black Bar Mitzvah mixtape, as well as Jewish-Canadian rapper Drake. He also recorded diss tracks towards Diddy, Swag Blanket's DLSupreme and 50 Cent (whom he has feuded with since 2003). Shyne and 50 had previously traded insults toward each other prior to this, including the latter calling him a "punk," while making light of his incarceration for his part in the "night club incident." He also performed a radio freestyle, disrespecting Shyne and others. Shyne responded with "For the Record", a track he recorded via a prison phone for Godfather Buried Alive (2004). 50 Cent later responded with "Piggy Bank" (2005), which he disses Shyne, Ja Rule, Fat Joe, Jadakiss and Nas, among others.

In November 2012, Shyne described the production of West Coast rapper Kendrick Lamar's sophomore studio album, good kid, m.A.A.d city, on social media as "trash". He received criticism for his remarks by Lamar's fans, and other California rappers including Schoolboy Q and Nipsey Hussle. His comments also involved him in a feud with The Game. After defending Lamar's album, Shyne dissed Game on tracks such as "Bury Judas" and "Psalms 68 (Guns & Moses)". These tracks reflected his study of Judaism. The Game responded with "Cough Up a Lung". In 2024, Shyne later expressed regret for his comments about Lamar's good kid, m.A.A.d city album.

In December 2012, Complex noted Shyne on its list of rappers who had suffered the "30 Worst Fall-Offs in Rap History", ranking him as number twenty-three.

== Political career ==
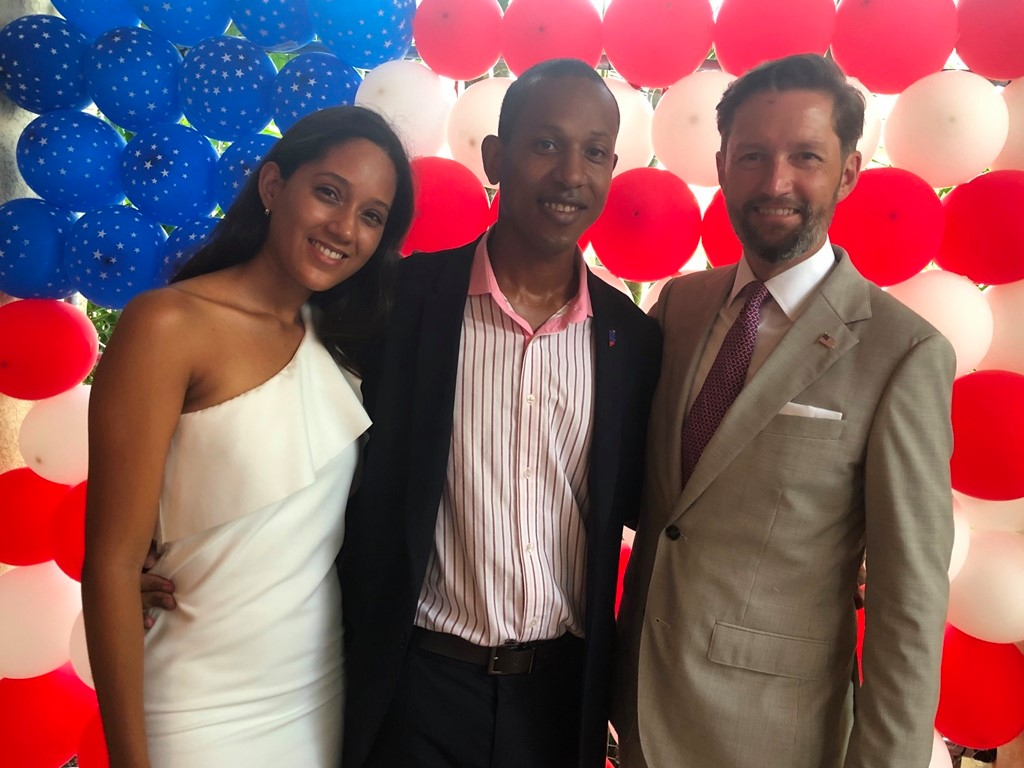
Shyne (center) with his wife Catherine and American Chargé d'Affaires Keith R. Gilges (2019)

In May 2010, Shyne was appointed the Belize Music and Goodwill Ambassador. Over the years, he brought Combs, Kanye West, and J. Prince to Belize and promoted cultural initiatives for Belizean youth.

In October 2012, Shyne, who was critical of the Obama administration, endorsed Republican nominee Mitt Romney in the U.S. presidential election, faulting former U.S. president Barack Obama for not doing anything to prevent the rapper's deportation to Belize. Asked if black voters should vote based on race alone, Shyne said: "I don't believe in all that, if you're Black you get a pass."

In 2020, Shyne was nominated by the center-right Belize United Democratic Party to stand as a candidate for the Belize House of Representatives in the Belize City-based Mesopotamia constituency in the 2020 Belizean general election. On November 11, 2020, Barrow won the House of Representatives seat for Mesopotamia. Part of his platform was to strengthen Belizean governance with increased penalties for those who commit crimes, to raise the salaries of its police, to strengthen the judicial system so as to address violent crime, and for the government to provide student loans at low interest rates.

Shyne was subsequently also appointed the Opposition Leader in the House of Representatives and the leader of the Belize United Democratic Party, in both June 2021 (until September 2021) and February 2022. He returned to the US for a state visit in August 2021, meeting with US politicians. The Atlanta City Council declared August 20, 2021, Shyne Barrow Day "for his dedication, commitment and service to the great people of Belize, Centrra America."

In January 2022, during an appearance on a Channel 7 talkshow, Barrow accused Prime Minister Johnny Briceño of involvement with drug cartels and made reference to the conviction of Briceño's father and other family members on drug trafficking charges. Briceño demanded a public retraction of Barrow's comments and threatened to sue both Barrow and Channel 7 for defamation. In January 2024, in response to Briceño progressing legal action, Barrow stated that Briceño was trying to "rewrite history – his father, uncle, cousin were all drug traffickers; to me that amounts to cartel", but stated his comments were taken out of context and were part of an argument as to why his own criminal history should not be a bar to political office.

In 2025, Barrow's United Democratic Party split into two factions before the general election, and Barrow lost his seat in the House of Representatives to Lee Mark Chang, a UDP member affiliated with the Alliance for Democracy faction who ran against him.

== Club New York shooting ==
=== Shooting and trial (1999–2001) ===
On December 27, 1999, Shyne, Sean Combs, and Combs' then-girlfriend, singer/actress Jennifer Lopez, were present at a shooting at Club New York, a Manhattan nightclub in Times Square. The three of them were in attendance at a Manhattan nightclub named Club New York, on West 43rd Street in Times Square. Witnesses said that a felon named Matthew "Scar" Allen started an argument with Combs. Witnesses later testified that Allen also threatened to kill Shyne.

Prosecutors charged that after Allen's accomplice threw money at Combs, the two men and Shyne all drew guns. Soon after, three gunshots were fired in the packed nightclub. The shooting resulted in three bystanders being injured. Shyne was accused by prosecutors as was Combs of drawing a gun in the confrontation. Shyne said he acted in self-defense. One injured witness, Natania Reuben, said she saw both Combs and Shyne shoot guns; Reuben was shot in the nose. Shyne was accused of firing three shots that wounded three people. He maintained that he had fired into the air, and did not believe that it was bullets from his gun that injured the bystanders.

Combs was represented by Benjamin Brafman and Johnnie Cochran, while Shyne's defense attorney was Murray Richman.

At his trial, an eyewitness and a ballistics expert testified that the three injuries may have been caused not by Shyne, but by a second gunman. The ballistics expert said that at least one injury may have been caused by a .40 caliber weapon, while Shyne had a 9 millimeter gun. 40-caliber shells were found on the floor.

Shyne was convicted at trial by a jury on two counts of assault and of reckless endangerment, and criminal possession of an illegal weapon, after a seven-week trial alongside Combs. He was acquitted of charges of attempted murder, on a third count of intentional assault in the first degree of a third victim, and one other count. He was sentenced on June 1, 2001, to ten years in prison, without eligibility for parole until 2009. He served nearly nine years in New York state prisons. Combs and his bodyguard, Anthony "Wolf" Jones, in contrast, were acquitted on all counts. Combs had been arrested and charged with illegally having two 9-millimeter guns and with bribery but was acquitted of the charges at the trial. Combs' bodyguard, who had been charged with illegal possession of a gun and bribery, was also acquitted at the trial.

Conrad Tillard, then known as the "hip hop minister" Conrad Muhammad, said: "Shyne's mother and grandmother placed this young man in the care and custody of Sean "Puffy" Combs, who they believed was a responsible executive of a company. Puffy has the same responsibility as a teacher, as a coach. This boy, Shyne, was out with his idol on that fateful night. When I put my child in your hands, I don't expect him to end up dead or in jail."

In the 2024 documentary The Honorable Shyne, he expressed the belief that his defense attorney may have undermined his trial. Claims made by others regarding ritual acts before the trial is noted in the documentary but lack independent verification.

=== Incarceration and Judaism conversion (2001–09) ===
Shyne began serving his sentence at the maximum security prison Clinton Correctional Facility in Dannemora, New York. His legal team requested for an appeal for a suspended sentence, which ultimately failed. During his time, Shyne attempted to "spit" on Combs after the latter tried to offer him $50,000 in cash to "take the fall" for the 1999 incident.

Barrow has said that from the age of 13, he began to identify as an Israelite, after learning that his great-grandmother was a descendant of the Beta Israel, ancient Ethiopian Jews. As a teenager, he began to study Judaism and the Old Testament on his own, and to pray daily. In March 2006, he legally changed his name to Moses Michael Levi Barrow. He had already been studying Judaism at the time of his arrest. In prison, with rabbis he became a practicing Jew, keeping kosher, and celebrating the Jewish Sabbath and Jewish holidays. He formally converted to Orthodox Judaism in Jerusalem, Israel, in 2010. Furthermore, as he had started to observe the Jewish Sabbath, he was completely unavailable for any publicity contacts on Friday nights and Saturdays.

Also in 2006, Shyne went to court to challenge New York's application of the "Son of Sam" law, which had resulted in his assets being frozen and limited his ability to make record deals and generate income. He and his lawyers argued that by the court allowing Shyne to make deals with record producers, it would enable him to pay a higher potential settlement to victims of the shooting, who were separately pursuing civil lawsuits against him.

Despite his convictions, his incarceration drew many sympathizers, as well as the admiration of many in the hip hop community. His adherence to the code of silence, which he referred to several times on his eponymous debut album, earned him a hardcore reputation in the prison community and on the streets. Even while incarcerated, he was visited by representatives of record labels who wanted to make deals.

Describing his nine years of incarceration, Shyne said:

The entire process was devastating.... ten hours of incarceration is ten hours too much. So, for a human being to be animalized for ten years, there is no quick fix to that.... It's like being shot by an assailant, and you are running away for your life. You didn't even realize you got shot in your leg because you are running on adrenaline. It's not until you get to a place of safety that you realize you have a hole in your leg, and you collapse.... When I came out I didn't even realize how wounded and devastated I was because I numbed myself to the pain and destruction that I suffered.

=== Release and deportation (2009) ===
Shyne was transferred to Rikers Island where he was held for a parole hearing, and then to the Woodbourne Correctional Facility, where he spent the last months of his incarceration. A Manhattan judge signed an order that would schedule Shyne for release on October 6, 2009. He had served more than 9 years of a 10-year sentence, on which no terms for post-release supervision had originally been placed. At the request of the New York State Department of Correctional Services, a mandatory probation period of at least two and half years was added to Shyne's sentence. Shyne and his attorney, Oscar Michelen, had hoped to avoid probation.

On October 6, 2009, Shyne was released from New York state custody, but was immediately taken into federal custody. He was detained by U.S. Immigration and Customs Enforcement at a "detention facility in western New York state". One source indicated that the facility in question was the Buffalo Federal Detention Facility in Batavia. According to his attorney, federal officials were reviewing the rapper's immigration status and making a determination on whether or not he would be deported to his native, Belize. Shyne had a permanent resident "green card", and his mother was a U.S. citizen, but he (himself) had never become a naturalized citizen. There was speculation that Shyne might be released on bail in the U.S., while his case was being resolved.

Shyne's uncle, Michael Finnegan, said that the family had prepared for the rapper's potential return to Belize. He revealed that Shyne and his representatives had been expecting to be intercepted by ICE officials upon his release, and had directed members of his legal team to prepare the necessary documents in an effort to address the situation. Dean Barrow, Belize's Prime Minister and Shyne's father, sent a petition to former New York state governor David Paterson, asking him to pardon his son. In 2008, Paterson had pardoned rapper Slick Rick who, in a similar situation, also faced deportation. Barrow said he had been assured that the governor received his letter and that his request was under consideration, but that he did not expect to have any influence in swaying the decision.

His family enlisted the assistance of Charles Ogletree, an attorney and Harvard Law School professor, and part of Barack Obama's circle, in Shyne's attempt to forestall deportation and regain entry into the U.S. In October 2009, Finnegan said that all legal matters regarding Shyne's case had been turned over to Ogletree. After all unsuccessful attempts to combat deportation from the country after his prison release, Shyne was deported to Belize on October 28, 2009. Given that he was a convicted felon, the United States would not allow him back into the country. Some of the hip hop community rallied to celebrate his release, and the events were followed by mainstream media.

== Post-deportation ==
In 2009, upon his return to Belize, he reconnected with his estranged father. In February 2010, the rapper was refused entry into the United Kingdom due to his conviction as a felon. He had begun his journey in Cancún, Mexico, but was deported upon arrival in the UK after immigration officials refused to allow him to enter the country.

=== Jerusalem ===
In 2010, Shyne moved to Jerusalem. In November 2010, he was living in Jerusalem, having become observant and legally changing his name to Moses Michael Levi. He spent his time learning the Torah, and spent up to 12 hours a day, studying it. He said that there was "nothing at odds between the hip-hop world and being a Torah-observant Jew", saying: "There's nothing in the Chumash that says I can't drive a Lamborghini."

In Jerusalem, he underwent a formal conversion to Orthodox Judaism. He also prayed wearing Jewish ritual tefillin in the mornings, studied Talmud with rigorous strictly Orthodox rabbis at the Or Sameach, Belz, and Mir yeshivas, and grew payot (sidecurls; worn by some men in the Orthodox Jewish community based on their interpretation of the requirements of Jewish law). He had studied seriously with rabbis while in prison, and adopted the Jewish laws to create boundaries and order in his life. He officially changed his name to Moses Levi to reflect his commitment to Judaism. He said: "My entire life screams that I have a Jewish neshama ["soul", in Hebrew]."

In December 2011, almost 12 years after the initial shooting, back in New York City, Matthew "Scar" Allen was shot and killed outside of Brooklyn's Footprints nightclub.

In April 2012, Shyne traveled to Kyiv, Ukraine, where he was a featured speaker at a conference on inter-religious understanding. The conference – called Global Winds of Change: Religions' Role in Today's World;The Challenges in Democracies and Secular Societies – brought together members of the world's many faiths to discuss the role of religion in modern society. Oleksandr Feldman, a member of the Ukrainian parliament and the President of the Ukrainian Jewish Committee, hosted the three-day event.

In March 2024, Natania Reuben, one of the three victims who had been shot during the December 27, 1999, nightclub shooting, recanted her statements on who shot her in the face, saying it was actually Sean Combs who shot her and not Shyne. She also alleged that Combs coerced her financially to testify through the trial that got Shyne convicted and Combs acquitted. She claims that Combs used force against her to testify that Shyne was the one who used the gun that shot her and the others by way of bribery and retaliation.

In 2024, Barrow described himself as a practicing but non-Haredi Jew: he said that he put on tefillin daily, fasted on Yom Kippur and observed Sukkot.

=== Return to Belize ===
In 2013, Shyne returned to Belize for the second time.

He returned to the U.S. for a visit in August 2021. In March 2022, Shyne received a Doctorate of Humane Letters (honoris causa) from the University of Liberia for his life's work "as a Humanitarian, Musician, and Legislator."

== Personal life ==
In 2017, he married a businesswoman named Catherine, and a year later they had a daughter, Naomi.

Since 2023, following allegations of sexual misconduct against former label boss Sean Combs, Shyne has renewed his criticism of him, calling him "a person who has destroyed [his] life". In the documentary, the Honorable Shyne, which chronicled his life and incarceration, he confirmed to have been "the fall guy" and "Diddy's scapegoat", while calling his actions "demonic" and "malicious", acknowledging that the industry and community "finally" believed him; Combs (through his legal team) vehemently denied all of Shyne's allegations. The documentary premiered on Hulu on November 18, 2024, and became the most viewed documentary on the streaming service within a day.

== Discography ==
Studio albums

- Shyne (2000)
- Godfather Buried Alive (2004)

== See also ==
- List of Afro-Latinos
