= Barrington Levy =

Jamaican musician (born 1964)

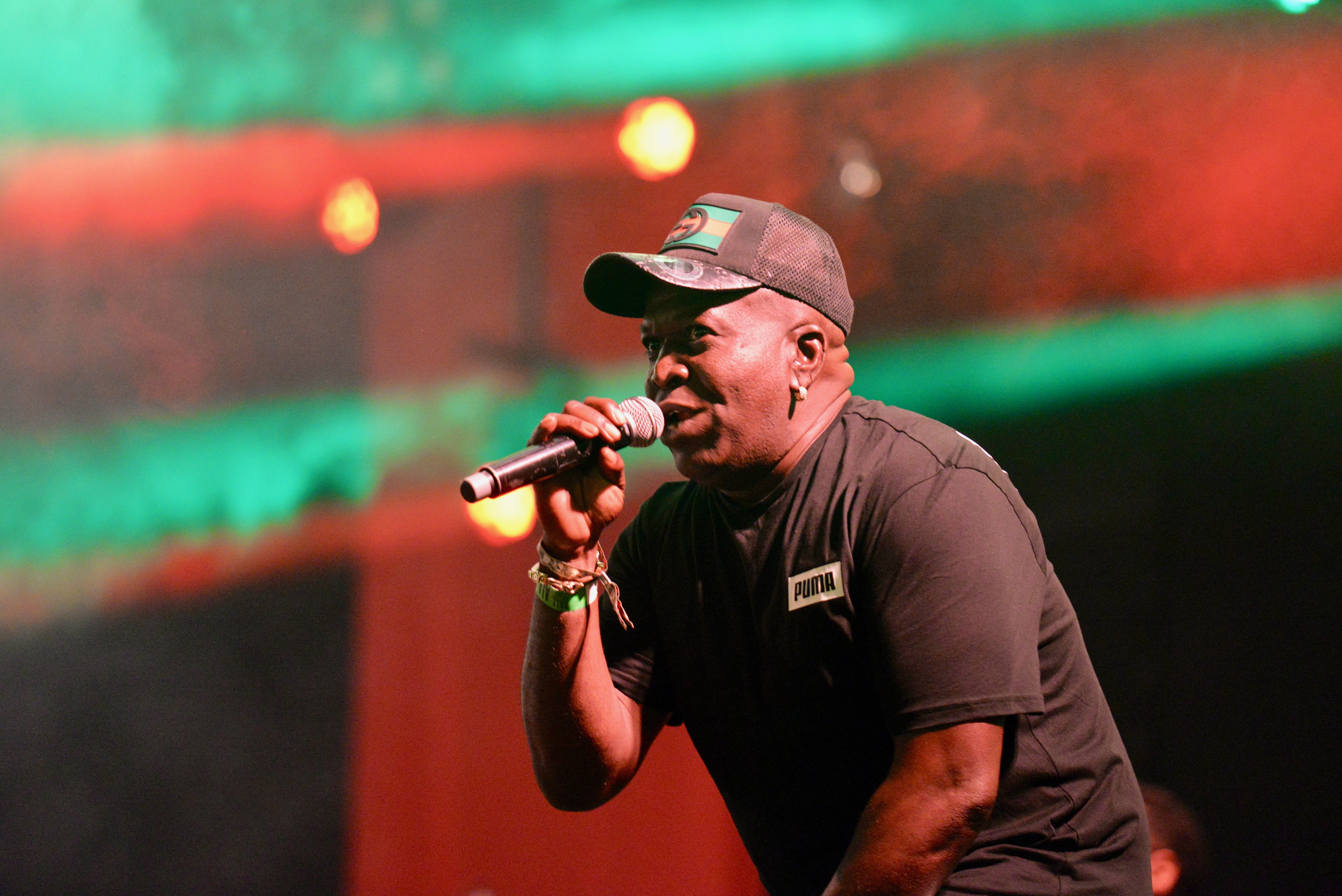
- Levy in Geel, Belgium

Background information
- Born: Barrington Ainsworth Levy; 30 April 1964 (age 62); Clarendon, Jamaica
- Genres: Reggae; dancehall; reggae fusion; ragga jungle
- Years active: 1976–present
- Label: MCA
- Website: www.barringtonlevy.com

Barrington Ainsworth Levy (born 30 April 1964) is a Jamaican reggae and dancehall musician from Clarendon, Jamaica.

== Career ==
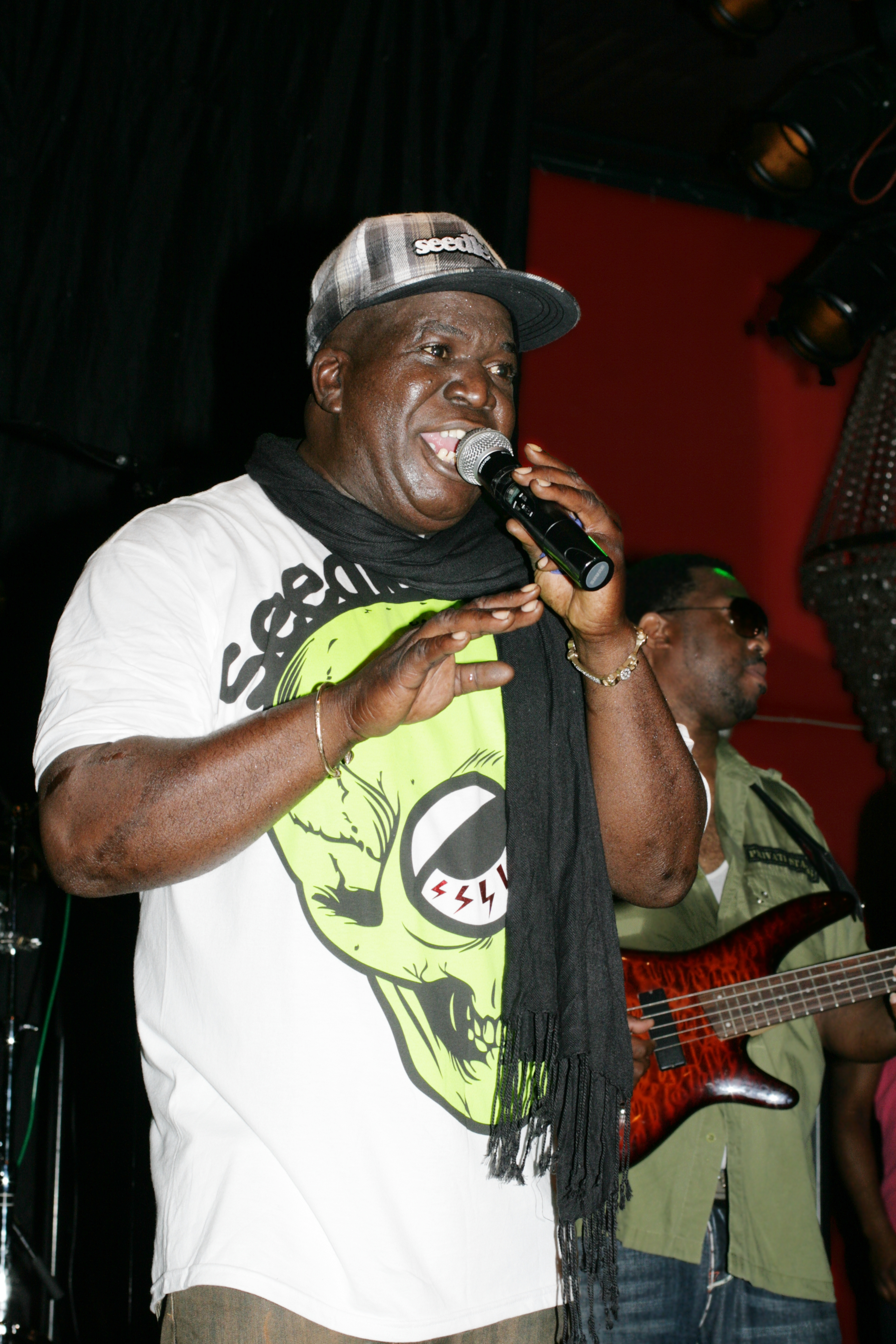
Barrington Levy in Stockholm, 29 November 2009

In 1977, Levy formed a band called the Mighty Multitude, with his cousin, Everton Dacres; the pair released "My Black Girl". Levy established his solo career the following year with the release of "A Long Time Since We Don't Have No Love"; though the single was a failure, the fourteen-year-old was a popular performer at Jamaican dancehalls. In an August 2014 interview with Midnight Raver, record producer Delroy Wright revealed that it was his brother Hyman Wright who first met Barrington Levy in the mid-1970s through Wade "Trinity" Brammer. According to Delroy Wright, Hyman Wright recorded a host of tracks with Barrington Levy prior to introducing him to Henry "Junjo" Lawes. These tracks would eventually appear on the album Bounty Hunter, which was released on the Jah Life record label. Both record producers recorded several singles with the Roots Radics, including "Ah Yah We Deh", "Looking My Love", "Englishman", "Skylarking", "Wedding Ring Aside" and "Collie Weed", all of which became hits and established Levy's career. Levy's next few singles were similarly successful, including "Shine Eye Girl", "Wicked Intention", "Jumpy Girl", "Disco Music", "Reggae Music", "Never Tear My Love Apart", "Jah", "You Made Me So Happy" and "When You're Young and in Love". Levy then recorded several duets with Toyan, Jah Thomas and Trinity, and appeared at Reggae Sunsplash in 1980 and 1981. Although albums were not terribly important in Jamaica at the time, Levy released four albums before 1980: Shaolin Temple, Bounty Hunter, Shine Eye Gal (United Kingdom) and Englishman, a critically acclaimed record. His success led to many earlier studio and sound system performances being reissued without his consent, releases he described as "joke business".

By the time his 1980 album Robin Hood was released, Levy was one of the biggest Jamaican stars, and saw his international fame growing as well, especially in the United Kingdom. Levy made his debut as a producer on the rare 1981 showcase album titled Run Come Ya, which was issued on the Canadian Puff Records label.

Taking a break from albums, Levy then released a series of hit singles, including "Mary Long Tongue", "In the Dark", "Too Poor", "I Have a Problem", "Eventide Fire a Disaster", "I'm Not in Love", "You Have It", "Love of Jah", "Under Mi Sensi", "Tomorrow Is Another Day", "Robberman", "Black Roses", "My Woman" and "Money Move". He began working with Paul "Jah Screw" Love and toured the UK in 1984, where he enjoyed a big hit on the reggae charts with "Under Mi Sensi", which was followed by the crossover hit "Here I Come", which reached number 41 in the UK Singles Chart in 1985. He returned to LPs with Lifestyle and Money Move, followed by a British hit album called Here I Come; Levy received the Best Vocalist prize at the British Reggae Awards in 1984. The late 1980s saw Levy, now in his twenties, slow down his recorded output, though he continued to perform and record regularly, and played at Sunsplash every year from 1987 to 1995. His fortunes were revived by two cover versions of Bob Andy songs - "My Time" and "Too Experienced", both produced by Jah Screw, and he was signed by Island Records in 1991 for the Divine album. In 1991 he returned to the UK chart with "Tribal Base", a single by Rebel MC featuring Levy and Tenor Fly, which reached number 20. In 1993, Levy tried to break in the United States with the Barrington album, produced by Lee Jaffe, Andre Betts and Sly & Robbie, but it failed to give him the breakthrough he wanted and his relationship with MCA Records was short-lived.

In the 1990s, Levy continued to release periodic hits in Jamaica, and more rarely in the UK, although his vocals were sampled and used in many underground and released jungle tunes. On 20 June 1991, he appeared on the BBC One music show Top of the Pops alongside Rebel MC (Congo Natty) and Tenor Fly as his track "Here I Come" was sampled by Rebel MC, with the record becoming the UK Top 40 hit "Tribal Base".

In 1998, he released Living Dangerously, which included a collaboration with one of Jamaica's most prolific deejays, Bounty Killer, and with Snoop Dogg. The release was one of Levy's most successful since the start of the 1990s, and saw him finally achieve some success in the US. Levy performed on two tracks on Long Beach Dub All Stars 1999 album Right Back, and also played a few shows with the band. He was featured on a 1999 track by the Rascalz titled "Top of the World", also featuring K-os. Levy also appeared on two singles by rapper Shyne ("Bad Boyz" and "Bonnie & Shyne"), and on a track for drum and bass artist Aphrodite's 2000 album Aftershock. "Here I Come" returned to the charts in 2001, with a new version by Levy and Talisman P reaching number 37 in the UK.

In 2004, he contributed to a track on the album White People by Handsome Boy Modeling School, a project by Prince Paul and Dan the Automator. He also did some collaborations with Slightly Stoopid on their 2005 album Closer to the Sun. Most recently, Levy made a guest appearance on the single "No Fuss" by Red-1 of the Rascalz, from his 2007 album Beg For Nothing.

In September 2013, he released the single "Love the Way She Love", a collaboration with Mr. Vegas, and announced an acoustic album featuring new songs and reworkings of old songs such as "Prison Oval Rock" and "Black Roses". His album, Acousticalevy, was nominated for a Grammy Award for Best Reggae Album in 2016.

In 2021, Levy was featured on the Gorillaz track "Meanwhile" alongside Jelani Blackman.

In 2023, Rolling Stone ranked Levy at number 119 on its list of the 200 Greatest Singers of All Time. He performed on the West Holts stage at that year's Glastonbury Festival.

Since 2011 Levy has been working on his album Survivor (the album originally had the working title It's About Time). In 2017 he released the first single from the album, "GSOAT", yet the album remains unreleased.

== Personal life ==
Levy's son Krishane is also a musician, and is signed to Atlantic Records.

Levy is a Rastafarian.

== Discography ==
=== Albums ===
Album name	Year released	Label
Bounty Hunter	1979	Jah Life Records
Shine Eye Gal	1979	Burning Sounds
Shaolin Temple	1979	Jah Guidance
Englishman	1979	Greensleeves Records
Robin Hood	1980	Greensleeves Records
Doh Ray Me	1980	JB
Run Come Ya!	1981	Jah Life Records
21 Girls Salute	1982	Jah Life Records
Poor Man Style	1983	Trojan Records
Barrington Levy's Life Style	1983	GG's
Teach Me Culture	1983	Live & Learn
Money Move	1983	Powerhouse
Here I Come	1984	Greensleeves Records
Barrington Levy Meets Frankie Paul (with Frankie Paul)	1984	Arrival
Barrington Levy	1984	Clocktower
Prison Oval Rock	1985	Volcano Records
Open Book	1985	Tuff Gong Records
Clash of the 80s (with Cocoa Tea)	1986	Cornerstone
Love The Life You Live	1988	Time; VP Records
Live and Learn Presents: Beres Hammond & Barrington Levy (with Beres Hammond)	1990	Live and Learn
The Barrington Levy Collection	1990	Greensleeves Records
Divine	1991	Island Records (sub. division Mango Records)
Turning Point	1992	Greensleeves Records
Barrington	1993	MCA Records
Time Capsule	1996	RAS Records
Living Dangerously	1998	Breakaway Records
Too Experienced: The Best of Barrington Levy (compilation album)	1998	VP Records
Duets; DJ Counteraction	1995; 2000	RAS Records; Greensleeves Records
Under Me Sensi	2000	Greensleeves Records
This Is Crucial Reggae: Barrington Levy	2004	RAS Records Sanctuary Records
Wanted (CD & DVD)	2005	2B1
Love Your Brother Man: The Early Years (compilation album)	2005	Trojan Records
Teach The Youth (Compilation album); Charted at number 10 in the Billboard Reggae album chart	2008	VP Records
Sweet Reggae Music (Compilation album)	2012	VP Records
Acousticalevy	2015	DDP

=== Singles ===
- "Mini Bus (On the Telephone)", (1984)
