= Trackmasters production discography =

This is the discography of production by Trackmasters (Poke & Tone).

== 1990 ==
=== Red Bandit - Cool Lover Boy ===
- 07.House People

== 1991 ==
=== Chubb Rock - The One ===
- 10. Cat (produced by Chubb Rock & Howie Tee, additional production by Trackmasters)
- 14. Bring 'Em Home Safely (produced by Chubb Rock & Howie Tee, additional production by Trackmasters)

=== Leaders of the New School - Sobb Story 12" ===
- A2. Sobb Story (Remix)

== 1992 ==
=== Chubb Rock - I Gotta Get Mine Yo ===
==== [produced with Chubb Rock] ====
- 01. Some -O- Next Shit
- 02. I'm the Man
- 03. Pop 'Nuff Shit
- 04. Don't Drink the Milk (featuring Kirk Gowdy & Poke)
- 05. The Hatred
- 06. Lost in the Storm
- 07. Which Way Is Up
- 08. Black Trek IV - The Voyage Home
- 09. Yabadabadoo (featuring Red Hot Lover Tone & Rob Swinga)
- 10. So Much Things to Say
- 11. The Funky (featuring Kirk Pone)
- 12. 3 Men at Chung King (featuring Red Hot Lover Tone & Grand Puba)
- 13. I Need Some Blow
- 14. I'm Too Much
- 15. My Brother
- 16. I Don't Want to Be Lonely
- 17. I Gotta Get Mine Yo!
- 18. A Message to the B.A.N.
- 19. Enter the Dragon
- 20. The Arrival
- 21. See You in October
- 00. Lost in the Storm (Remix)

=== Shante - The Bitch Is Back ===
- 08. Straight Razor

=== Kool G Rap & DJ Polo - Live and Let Die ===
- 09. Straight Jacket
- 10. Ill Street Blues
- 15. Fuck U Man

=== Red Hot Lover Tone - Red Hot Lover Tone ===
- 01. True Confessions (1:07)
- 02. Da Gigolow (2:40)
- 03. Winderella (3:06)
- 04. Porgee (0:44)
- 05. Like a Virgin (2:39)
- 06. D.I.Y.M. (3:08)
- 07. In the Business (4:24)
- 08. I Like (3:05)
- 09. Gigalow Thing (2:09)
- 10. Never Love (4:51)
- 11. Pussy's All That (3:03)
- 12. Give It Up (3:54)
- 13. It Burns (0:30)
- 14. Li'l Boy Blu (3:53)
- 15. Gigolows Got It Going On (3:18)
- 16. Gotta Run (3:52)
- 17. Sex Anonymous (1:14)
- 18. My Lady (3:44)

=== The Real Roxanne - Go Down (But Don't Bite It) ===
==== [produced with Chubb Rock] ====
- 01. Ya Brother Does
- 02. Gear (featuring Chubb Rock)
- 03. If I Can't Have You
- 04. Mama Can I Get Some
- 05. Latino Blues
- 06. Go Down (But Don't Bite It)
- 07. Influx (featuring Red Hot Lover Tone)
- 08. Same Real Rox
- 09. Where There's a Will
- 10. Roxanne Shit Is Over
- 11. Roxanne's Suite

=== The A.T.e.E.M. - A Hero Ain't Nuttin'but a Sandwich ===
- 01. A Hero Ain't Nuttin' But a Sandwich - Hot Dog, Rob Swinga & Chubb Rock
- 02. Pass the Pussy - Hot Dog, Rob Swinga, Kirk Pone & Red Hot Lover Tone
- 03. Yeah - F.M., Rob Swinga & Hot Dog
- 04. Interlude
- 05. Get It On (Original) - Rob Swinga, Hot Dog, Red Hot Lover Tone & Kirk Pone
- 06. Come on Baby Let's Swing It - Hot Dog, Rob Swinga & Red Hot Lover Tone
- 07. Come - Chubb Rock
- 08. Sister Morphine - Hot Dog, Rob Swinga & Chubb Rock
- 09. Well of 1000 Souls - Hot Dog, Rob Swinga & Red Hot Lover Tone
- 10. One, Two, U Don't Stop - Hot Dog & Rob Swinga
- 11. All of That - Rob Swinga, Hot Dog & Chubb Rock
- 12. Interlude
- 13. Let Me Hear You Say Hoe! - Chubb Rock & Red Hot Lover Tone
- 14. Get It On (Remix) - Rob Swinga, Hot Dog, Red Hot Lover Tone & Kirk Pone

== 1993 ==
=== TCF Crew - Come and Play with Me ===
- 02. I Ain't the One
- 13. Ooo Baby Baby

=== Pudgee tha Phat Bastard - Give 'Em the Finger ===
- 01.Intro
- 03. The Vibe
- 04. Checkin' out the Ave.
- 05. Give 'em the Finger
- 06. When He Comes On
- 07. This Is How We... (featuring Kool G Rap)
- 09. Lady in My Life (featuring MC Lyte)
- 11. Mommie Dearest
- 12. Doin' M.C.'s Sum'n Terrible (featuring F.M & Snagglepuss)
- 13. Clap Your Hands
- 14. How U Feel About That

=== Big Daddy Kane - Looks Like a Job For... ===
- 01. Looks Like a Job For...
- 02. How U Get a Record Deal?
- 03. Chocolate City (co-produced with DJ Clash & Robert Brown)

=== YZ - The Ghetto's Been Good to Me ===
- 02. The Return (Remix)
- 05. (So Far) The Ghetto's Been Good to Me (Co-produced with YZ)

== 1994 ==
=== Crustified Dibbs - Hua Hoo 12" ===
- 10. Bloodshed Hua Hoo (Produced by Pokey)

=== Changing Faces - Changing Faces ===
- 10. Baby Your Love (Co-produced with Heavy D)

=== House Party 3 (soundtrack) ===
- 07. The Illest - Red Hot Lover Tone

=== Mary J. Blige - My Life ===
- 17. Be Happy (Produced by Poke)

=== Heavy D - Nuttin' But Love ===
- 01. Friends & Respect
- 12. Move On
- 00. Nuttin' but Love (Reggae Mix)

=== The Notorious B.I.G. - Ready to Die ===
- 10. Juicy (Produced by Poke & Sean "Puffy" Combs)
- 14. Respect (Produced by Poke & Sean "Puffy" Combs)
- 18. Who Shot Ya (Produced by Poke & Sean "Puffy" Combs) {Bonus Track}

== 1995 ==
=== Soul for Real - Candy Rain ===
- 01. Candy Rain (co-produced by Heavy D)
- 02. Every Little Thing I Do (co-produced by Heavy D)
- 03. All in My Mind (produced by Poke, Alex Richbourg & Heavy D)
- 04. If You Want It (co-produced by Heavy D)
- 05. I Wanna Be Your Friend (co-produced by Heavy D)
- 07. Spend the Night (co-produced by Heavy D)
- 08. I Don't Know (produced by Poke & Heavy D)
- 09. If Only You Knew (produced by Poke & Heavy D)
- 00. Candy Rain (Remix) (co-produced by Heavy D)
- 00. Every Little Thing I Do (TM Bounce Remix)

=== Pure Soul - I Want You Back 12" ===
- I Want You Back (TM Everything's Lovely Remix)

=== Silk - Hooked on You 12" ===
- A3. Hooked on You (TM Remix) [feat. Foxy Brown & "TYME" Riley]

=== LL Cool J - Mr. Smith ===
- 02. Make It Hot
- 03. Hip Hop
- 04. Hey Lover (featuring Boyz II Men)
- 07. I Shot Ya (featuring Keith Murray)
- 08. Mr Smith (mainly produced by Chyskillz)
- 11. Hollis to Hollywood
- 13. Get da Drop on 'Em'
- 14. Prelude (Skit)
- 15. I Shot Ya (Remix) [featuring Keith Murray, Prodigy, Fat Joe & Foxy Brown]
- 00. Loungin (Who Do Ya Love Remix) [feat. Total]

=== Red Hot Lover Tone - #1 Player ===
- 05. BMW
- 07. Damian's Hook (co-produced by Silver D)
- 09. Yes Yes Y'all
- 12. 4 My Peeps (Remix) {featuring M.O.P., The Notorious B.I.G. & Organized Konfusion} [co-produced by Frank "Nitty" Pimental]
- 13. Take Your Time (featuring Don Baron)

=== Asante - All About You 12" ===
- A2. All About You (Remix)

=== Jon B. - Pretty Girl 12" ===
- A3. Pretty Girl (Remix)

=== Faith Evans - Faith ===
- 02. No Other Love (Produced by Poke & Sean "Puffy" Combs)
- 03. Fallin' in Love (Produced by Poke & Sean "Puffy" Combs)

=== Various Artists - New York Undercover (soundtrack) ===
- 04. L.I.F.E. - Tyme
- 05. Dom Perignon - Little Shawn
- 08. I Will Go - Anthony Hamilton and Terri Robinson

== 1996 ==
=== Total - Total ===
- 03. No One Else (feat. Da Brat) (Produced by Poke & Sean "Puffy" Combs)
- 13. Spend Some Time (Produced by Poke & Sean "Puffy" Combs)

=== Jesse Powell - Jesse Powell ===
- 01. Looking for Love
- 04. I LIke

=== Monifah - Moods...Moments ===
- 05. Nobody's Body (co-produced by Heavy D)
- 06. Don't Waste My Time (co-produced by Heavy D)
- 12. Everything You Do

=== Mariah Carey - Underneath the Stars 12" ===
- Underneath the Stars (Drifting Remix)

=== Nas - It Was Written ===
- 01. Album Intro
- 02. The Message
- 03. Street Dreams
- 05. Watch Dem Niggas (featuring Foxy Brown)
- 08. Affirmative Action (featuring The Firm) [additional production by Dave Atkinson]
- 10. Black Girl Lost (featuring JoJo Hailey) [co-produced with L.E.S.]
- 12. Shootouts
- 14. If I Ruled the World (Imagine That) [featuring Lauryn Hill] {additional production by Rashad Smith}
- 00. Street Dreams (Remix) [featuring R. Kelly]

=== Michael Jackson - They Don't Care About Us 12" ===
- A2. They Don't.. (TM Remix)

=== New Edition - Hit Me Off 12" ===
- A3. Hit Me Off (TM Remix)

=== Anthony Hamilton - Nobody Else 12" ===
- A4. Nobody Else (Remix) [featuring Punchline]

=== Babyface - This Is for the Lover in You 12" ===
- A4. This Is for the Lover in You (Trackmasters Remix) [feat. LL Cool J]

=== Foxy Brown - Ill Na Na ===
- 02. Holy Matrimony (Letter to the Firm)
- 03. Foxy's Bells
- 04. Get Me Home (featuring Blackstreet) [co-produced by Teddy Riley]
- 06. Interlude (The Set-Up) [Co-produced with Nice & George Pearson]
- 07. If I...
- 08. The Chase
- 11. Fox Boogie (featuring Kid Capri)
- 12. I'll Be (featuring Jay-Z)

=== Shaquille O'Neal - You Can't Stop the Reign ===
- 05. No Love Lost (featuring Jay-Z & Lord Tariq)
- 11. Let's Wait Awhile

=== 702 - No Doubt ===
- 01. Get Down Like Dat

=== Various Artists - Space Jam (soundtrack) ===
- 05. Hit 'Em High (The Monstars' Anthem) - B-Real, Coolio, Method Man, LL Cool J & Busta Rhymes

== 1997 ==
=== Allure - Allure ===
- 01. Introduction (Featuring Nature)
- 02. Anything You Want
- 03. You're Gonna Love Me
- 04. Head over Heels (featuring Nas)
- 05. No Question (featuring LL Cool J)
- 07. The Story
- 08. Come into My House (Interlude)
- 09. When You Need Someone
- 10. Give You All I Got (featuring Raekwon)
- 11. I'll Give You Anything
- 00. Head over Heels [Remix] (featuring Tone and AZ)

=== LL Cool J - Phenomenon ===
- 02. Candy (featuring Ralph Tresvant & Ricky Bell)
- 04. Another Dollar (co-produced by Kurt Gowdy)
- 05. Nobody Can Freak You (featuring Keith Sweat & LeShaun)
- 09. Father

=== Mario Winans - Story of All My Days ===
- 11. Don't Know (TM Remix)

=== Mary J. Blige - Share My World ===
- 01. Intro (co-produced by Nice)
- 04. Round and Round (co-produced by George “Golden Fingers” Pearson)
- 05. Share My World (Interlude) [co-produced by Nice]
- 12. Keep Your Head (co-produced by George “Golden Fingers” Pearson)

=== Mariah Carey - Butterfly ===
- 04. The Roof

=== Various Artists - How to Be a Player (soundtrack) ===
- 02. Big Bad Mama - Foxy Brown with Dru Hill

=== Various Artists - Steel (soundtrack) ===
- Men of Steel - Shaquille O'Neal, Ice Cube, B-Real, KRS-One & Peter Gunz (exec. produced by Ken Ross)

=== Various Artists - Men in Black (soundtrack) ===
- 08. Escobar '97 - Nas

=== Jay-Z - In My Lifetime, Vol. 1 ===
- 10. Face Off (featuring Sauce Money)

=== Wishing on a Star 12" ===
- A1. Wishing on a Star
- B1. Wishing on a Star (Remix)

=== The Firm - The Firm: The Album ===
- 05. Executive Decision (co-produced by Kurt Gowdy)
- 07. Firm Allstars (featuring Pretty Boy)
- 10. Hardcore
- 15. Desperados (featuring Canibus)
- 17. I'm Leaving (featuring Noreaga)
- 18. Throw Your Guns (featuring Half-A-Mil)
- 00. Firm Biz (Remix) (feat. Half-a-Mil)

=== Will Smith - Big Willie Style ===
- 01. Intro
- 03. Gettin' Jiggy wit It (Co-Produced By L.E.S.)
- 04. Candy (featuring Larry Blackmon & Cameo) [Co-Produced By L.E.S.]
- 05. Chasing Forever (Co-Produced By L.E.S.)
- 06. Keith B-Real I (Interlude)
- 08. Miami
- 09. Yes Yes Y'all (featuring Camp Lo) [Co-Produced By L.E.S.]
- 11. Keith B-Real II
- 14. Keith B-Real III
- 15. Big Willie Style (featuring Left Eye)
- 16. Men in Black (featuring Coko) {also on MIB (Soundtrack)}
- 17. Just Cruisin' {also on MIB (Soundtrack)}
- 00. Just Cruisin' (TM Remix)

=== Brian McKnight - Anytime ===
- 07. Hold Me (featuring Willie Max) [co-produced by Cory Rooney]

=== AZ - Hey AZ 12" ===
- Hey AZ (featuring SWV)

== 1998 ==
=== Various Artists - Ride (soundtrack) ===
- 03. Blood Money (Part 2) - Nas, Nature & Noreaga (Produced by Pokey)

=== Cam'ron - Confessions of Fire ===
- 07. Horse & Carriage (featuring Mase)

=== MC Lyte - Seven & Seven ===
- 08. Put It on You

===D1===

- 03. If I'm wit You (Co-Produced for R. Kelly)
- 08. We Ride (featuring Jay-Z, Cam'ron, Vegas Cats & Noreaga) [Produced with R. Kelly, Co-Produced by Cory Rooney]
- 11. Only the Loot Can Make Me Happy (Co-Produced by R. Kelly)

===D2===

- 03. Did You Ever Think (Produced with R. Kelly, Co-Produced by Cory Rooney)
- 04. Dollar Bill (featuring Foxy Brown) [Produced with R. Kelly, Co-Produced by Al West]
- 12. Money Makes the World Go Round (featuring Nas) [Co-Produced by R. Kelly]

=== Noreaga - N.O.R.E. ===
- 04. N.O.R.E.
- 06. Hed (featuring Nature)
- 08. Fiesta (featuring Kid Capri)

=== Method Man - Tical 2000: Judgement Day ===
- 25. Break Ups 2 Make Ups (featuring D'Angelo)

=== Sunz of Man - Shining Star 12" ===
- A2. Shining Star (Remix) {odd}

=== Kid Capri - Soundtrack to the Streets ===
- 20. We're Unified (TM Remix) - Snoop Dogg & Slick Rick

=== Various Artists - Woo (Soundtrack) ===
- 11. Let It Be - Allure & 50 Cent (Produced with Cory Rooney)

=== Sparkle - Sparkle ===
- 01. Good Life

=== 98° - 98° and Rising ===
- 02. Heat It Up
- 09. Do You Wanna Dance

=== Various Artists - Belly (soundtrack) ===
- 18. I Wanna Live - Bravehearts

== 1999 ==
=== Blaque - Blaque ===
- 06. 808 (Produced with R. Kelly)
- 07. Time After Time (Produced with Cory Rooney)
- 10. Don't Go Looking for Love (Co-produced by Cory Rooney)
- 11. Release Me (Co-produced by Cory Rooney)

=== Slick Rick - The Art of Storytelling ===
- 04. Bring It to Your Hardest (featuring Nas)

=== Harlem World - The Movement ===
- 03. Crew of the Year

=== Made Men - Classic Limited Edition ===
- 09. Wise Guys for Life (co-produced by L.E.S.)

=== Nas - I Am... ===
- 11. Dr. Knockboot

=== Noreaga - Melvin Flynt – Da Hustler ===
- 04. Da Hustla
- 11. What the Fuck Is Up

=== Various Artists - In Too Deep (soundtrack) ===
- 04. Use to Me Spending - R. Kelly, Nokio & Jaz-Ming
- 05. How to Rob - The Madd Rapper & 50 Cent {also on Tell Em Why U Madd}
- 12. Give Me a Reason - Dave Hollister

=== Various Artists - The Wood (soundtrack) ===
- 07. It's All Good - R. Kelly

=== Will Smith - Willennium ===
- 03. Freakin' It

=== Marc Anthony - I Need to Know 12" ===
- A3. I Need to Know (Remix)

=== Destiny's Child - Bills, Bills, Bills 12" ===
- A3. I Can't Go For That (Bills, Bills, Bills, Remix) [feat. Sporty Thievz]

=== Jennifer Lopez - On the 6 ===
- 02. Should've Never

=== Trina & Tamara - Trina & Tamara ===
- 12. What'd You Come Here For? (Remix) [featuring Cam'ron & 50 Cent]

=== Ricky Martin - Livin' la Vida Loca 12" ===
- A2. Livin' la Vida Loca (Remix) [featuring Big Pun & Fat Joe]

== 2000 ==
=== Kandi - Cheatin' On Me ===
- 01. Cheatin' On Me (Track Masters Remix (Clean W/No Rap))
- 02. Cheatin' On Me (Track Masters Remix (Clean W/No Rap - Featuring 50 Cent))
- 03. Cheatin' On Me (A-Foc-Alipse Remix (Clean))
- 04. Cheatin' On Me (Track Masters Remix (Instrumental))
- 05. Cheatin' On Me (LP Version)

=== R. Kelly - TP-2.com ===
- 08. Fiesta (co-produced with Precision)

=== Destiny's Child - Charlie's Angels (soundtrack) / Survivor ===
- 01. Independent Women Part I (co-produced with Cory Rooney & Beyoncé)

=== Amil - All Money Is Legal ===
- 01. I Got That (featuring Beyoncé) [co-produced by L.E.S.]

=== 3LW - 3LW ===
- 14. I Can't Take It (No More Remix) [feat. Nas]

=== Various Artists - Backstage: Music Inspired by the Film ===
- 02. Best of Me, Part 2 - Jay-Z & Mya

=== Nature - For All Seasons ===
- 02. Man's World
- 08. Nature's Shine
- 09. Smoke
- 11. Talking That Shit
- 13. Don't Stop

=== Half a Mill - Milíon ===
- 05. Quiet Money (featuring AZ)

=== 50 Cent - Power of the Dollar (~~Never Released)~~ ===
- 06. That Ain't Gangsta
- 08. Ghetto Qu'ran
- 10. Money By Any Means (featuring N.O.R.E.) [co-produced by Teflon]
- 11. Material Girl (featuring Dave Hollister)
- 13. Slow Doe
- 14. Gun Runner (featuring Black Child)
- 16. Power of the Dollar

=== Mya - Fear of Flying ===
- 17. Man in My Life (co-produced by The Mercenaries)

=== Cam'ron - S.D.E. ===
- 09. Freak

=== LL Cool J - G.O.A.T. ===
- 07. Fugidabowdit (featuring DMX, Redman & Method Man)

=== Various Artists - Big Momma's House (soundtrack) ===
- 11. Love's Not Love - Marc Nelson (co-produced by Chris Robinson & Ira Antelis)

=== Toshi Kubota - Nothing but Your Love ===
- 12. It's Over

== 2001 ==
=== Jay-Z - The Blueprint ===
- 5. Jigga That Nigga

=== 2Pac - Until The End Of Time ===
- 6. Letter 2 My Unborn
- 13. Until the End of Time

=== Wu-Tang Clan - Iron Flag ===
- 10. Back in the Game

=== Nas - Stillmatic ===
- 11. Rule (featuring Amerie)

=== Fubu - The Good Life (FUBU album) ===
- 03. Fatty Girl

=== Usher - 8701 ===
- U Remind Me (Remix) [featuring Method Man and Blu Cantrell]

=== R. Kelly - Fiesta ===
- Fiesta (Remix) [featuring Jay-Z] {co-produced with Precision}

=== Benzino - The Benzino Project ===
- 11. Picture This (featuring Foxy Brown)

=== City High - Caramel 12" ===
- A4. Caramel (Remix) [feat. Eve]

=== Shareesa - No Half Steppin 12" ===
- No Half Steppin' {co-produced with Precision}

=== Blaque - Can't Get It Back 12" ===
- A1. Can't Get It Back (Remix) [featuring Royce da 5'9"]

=== Toni Braxton - Snowflakes ===
- 09. Christmas in Jamaica (Remix) [feat. Shaggy]

== 2002 ==
=== Royce da 5'9" - Rock City ===
- 05. You Can't Touch Me

=== Jennifer Lopez - J to tha L–O! The Remixes ===
- 03. I'm Gonna Be Alright (Trackmasters Remix) [featuring Nas/50 Cent]

=== Jennifer Lopez - This Is Me... Then ===
- 07. Jenny from the Block (featuring Styles P and Jadakiss) [Produced with Cory Rooney and Troy Oliver]

=== Nas - The Lost Tapes ===
- 06. "Blaze a 50" (produced with L.E.S.)
- 09. "Drunk by Myself" (produced with Alvin West)
- 12. "Fetus (Belly Button Window)"

=== R. Kelly & Jay-Z - The Best of Both Worlds (co-produced with R. Kelly) ===
- 02. Take You Home with Me a.k.a. Body
- 03. Break Up to Make Up
- 04. It Ain't Personal
- 06. Green Light (featuring Beanie Sigel)
- 08. Shake Ya Body (featuring Lil' Kim)
- 09. Somebody's Girl
- 10. Get This Money
- 11. Shorty
- 12. Honey

=== Eve - Eve-Olution ===
- 07. Figure You Out [produced with Frank "Nitty" Pimentel]

=== LL Cool J - 10 ===
- 2. Born to Love You
- 4. Paradise (featuring Amerie)
- 14. Mirror Mirror

=== Tyrese - I Wanna Go There ===
- 14. Taking Forever (featuring Mos Def)

=== Will Smith - Born to Reign ===
- 03. I Can't Stop
- 05. 1000 Kisses

== 2003 ==
=== Keith Murray - He's Keith Murray ===
- 11. Da Ba Dunk Song

=== Fabolous - Street Dreams ===
- 03. Damn
- 04. Call Me

=== Nick Cannon - Nick Cannon ===
- 02. Feelin' Freaky (featuring B2K) [co-produced by R. Kelly]

=== Loon - Loon ===
- 07. This Ain't Funny

== 2004 ==
=== R. Kelly & Jay-Z - Unfinished Business ===
- 01. The Return (co-produced by Alexander "Spanador" Mosley)
- 02. Big Chips (co-produced by Alexander "Spanador" Mosley)
- 03. We Got 'Em Goin' (co-produced with R. Kelly)
- 04. She's Coming Home With Me (co-produced by Alexander "Spanador" Mosley)
- 06. Stop (featuring Foxy Brown)
- 07. Mo' Money
- 08. Pretty Girls (co-produced with R. Kelly)
- 09. Break Up (That's All We Do)
- 10. Don't Let Me Die (co-produced by Alexander "Spanador" Mosley)
- 11. The Return (Remix) [featuring Slick Rick and Doug E. Fresh] {co-produced by Alexander "Spanador" Mosley}

=== Fabolous - Real Talk ===
- 07. Girls

=== Tamia - More ===
- 01. On My Way
- 02. More

== 2005 ==
=== Ginuwine - Back II da Basics ===
- 8. She's Like
- 10. Glaze in My Eyes

=== Rihanna - Music of the Sun ===
- 3. If It's Lovin' that You Want

== 2006 ==
=== LL Cool J - Todd Smith ===
- 03. Favorite Flavor (featuring Mary J. Blige)
- 08. I've Changed (featuring Ryan Toby)
- 10. #1 Fan
- 11. Down the Aisle (featuring 112)
- 13. So Sick (Remix) [featuring Ne-Yo]

=== Governor - Son of Pain ===
- 01. Blood, Sweat & Tears

== 2008 ==
=== The Game - LAX ===
- 20. Ain't Fuckin With You (iTunes bonus track)

=== Ludacris - Theater of the Mind ===
- 04. One More Drink (featuring T-Pain)

=== Ray J - All I Feel ===
- 07. Boyfriend

=== Keyshia Cole - A Different Me ===
- 13. Where This Love Could End Up (produced by Poke & Tone and The Are)
- 14. Beautiful Music (co-produced by Spanador)

=== Jamie Foxx - Intuition ===
- 16. Cover Girl (featuring Lil' Kim)

== 2013 ==
=== LL Cool J - Authentic ===
- 01. Bath Salt
- 03. New Love (featuring Charlie Wilson)
- 06. Something About You (Love the World) [featuring Charlie Wilson, Earth, Wind & Fire & Melody Thornton]
- 07. Bartender Please (featuring Snoop Dogg, Bootsy Collins & Travis Barker)
- 08. Whaddup (featuring Chuck D, Travis Barker, Tom Morello & Z-Trip)
- 10. Closer (featuring Monica)
- 14. Jump on It
- 15. Take It (featuring Joe)

== Remixes ==
- 1991: "Sobb Story" (Remix) - Leaders Of The New School featuring Rampage
- 1995: "I'll Be There for You/You're All I Need to Get By" (Puff Daddy Mix) - Method Man featuring Mary J. Blige
- 1995: "Wanna Make Moves" (Remix) - Red Hot Lover Tone
- 1996: "This Is for the Lover in You" (Remix) - Babyface
- 1996: "Loungin" (Remix) - LL Cool J and Total
- 1996: "Street Dreams" (Remix) - Nas featuring R. Kelly
- 1996: "They Don't Care About Us" (Remix) - Michael Jackson
- 1996: "Hit Me Off" (Trackmasters Remix) - New Edition
- 1996: "Underneath the Stars" (The Drifting Remix) - Mariah Carey
- 1997: "Wishing on a Star" (Trackmasters Remix) - Jay-Z
- 1997: "Just Cruisin'" (Trackmasters Remix) - Will Smith
- 1997: "Don't Know" (Trackmasters Remix) - Mario Winans featuring Mase and Allure
- 1998: "Changes - 2Pac
- 1998: "We're Unified" (Trackmasters Remix) Kid Capri featuring Slick Rick and Snoop Doggy Dogg
- 1999: "Bills, Bills, Bills" (Trackmasters Remix) - Destiny's Child featuring Jaz-Ming & Sporty Thievz
- 1999: "Did You Ever Think" (Remix) - R. Kelly featuring Nas
- 1999: "Hold Me" (Trackmasters Remix) - Brian McKnight featuring Kobe Bryant
- 1999: "Livin' la Vida Loca" (Trackmasters Remix) - Ricky Martin featuring Big Pun, Cuban Link and Fat Joe
- 1999: "I Need to Know" (Trackmasters Remix) - Marc Anthony featuring Remy Ma
- 2000: "The Best of Me" (Trackmasters Remix) - Mýa featuring Jadakiss & "Best of Me, Part 2" featuring Jay-Z
- 2000: "I Can't Take It (No More Remix)" - 3LW featuring Nas
- 2001: "Request Line" (Trackmasters Remix) - The Black Eyed Peas featuring Macy Gray
- 2001: "Hit 'Em Up Style (Oops!)" (Trackmasters Remix) - Blu Cantrell featuring Foxy Brown
- 2001: "Christmas in Jamaica" (Remix) - Toni Braxton featuring Shaggy
- 2001: "You Rock My World" (Trackmasters Remix) - Michael Jackson featuring Jay-Z
- 2001: "Butterflies" (Trackmasters Remix) - Michael Jackson featuring Eve
- 2001: "Caramel" (Trackmasters Joint Remix) - City High
- 2001: "Ice King" (Remix) - Res featuring Nas
- 2001: "U Remind Me" (Trackmasters Remix) - Usher featuring Method Man and Blu Cantrell
- 2002: "Jenny from the Block" (Trackmasters Remix) - Jennifer Lopez featuring Jadakiss and Styles P
- 2002: "I'm Gonna Be Alright" (Trackmasters Remix) - Jennifer Lopez featuring Nas
- 2003: "Talkin' to Me" (Trackmasters Remix) - Amerie featuring Foxy Brown
- 2003: "I've Got Something Better" (Trackmasters Remix) - Lisa Stansfield
