= Carol Case =

American executive producer

- Occupation: Executive Producer
- Years active: 1988–present

Carol Case is an American executive producer who began her production career in 1988 as the director rep for Bob Giraldi, of Michael Jackson "Beat It" fame.

Among Case and Giraldi's collaborative successes was the music video for Will Smith's "Just the Two of Us" which Case executive produced. The video won the 1998 MTV Video Music Award for Best Male Video.

== Career ==
Case began a yearlong run as partner, managing director and head of sales at production company, Original Film in 1998.

In 1999, Case was the first woman to serve as chairperson at the annual Association of Independent Commercial Producers (AICP) show at the Museum of Modern Art (MoMA): The Art and Technique of the American Commercial.

Giraldi's company Giraldi Suarez Productions brought Case aboard in 2000 as partner and director of sales to launch New York City-based production house, GSP4.

In 2001, Case and Giraldi launched production shingle, Case/Giraldi Media with the premiere of the music video for Ricky Martin's "Loaded". That same year, Case and Giraldi allied to create The Routine, a short film for Sony, directed by Giraldi and executive produced by Case. The Routine opened at the 2002 Sundance Film Festival and went on to win Best Drama at the Los Angeles International Short Film Festival.

Case executive produced Dream Begins, a short film directed by Giraldi as part of New York's Olympics bid in 2002. The film won Best Drama at the 6th Annual Los Angeles International Short Film Festival and is a permanent part of the archives at MoMA.

In 2003, Case and partners Giraldi and Patti Greaney opened production company 149Wooster. In 2005, the company produced Honey Trap, starring Debbie Harry, directed by Giraldi and executive produced by Case. The film won the Gold Remi Award at the 39th Annual WorldFest Houston and screened at various festivals, including the Hamptons International Film Festival, Palm Springs International Film Festival, the San Diego Film Festival, and the Raindance Film Festival in the UK.

Playroom, a commercial and music video production company with a multi-cultural focus, was also opened in 2003 by Case and Giraldi. The company had U.S. offices in New York and Los Angeles and affiliates in Madrid and Mexico City, with Case as executive producer and representing its directors, Alejandro Toledo, Carlos Sama, Yann Malka, and others.

Case co-chaired the annual Spring Women's Luncheon fundraiser for New York's Museum of Jewish Heritage from 1998 to 2004.

From 2014 to 2016, Case, whose husband, Ira Lieberman, was diagnosed with Parkinson's in 2005, served as an ambassador to Partners in Parkinson's (PIP), which was developed with AbbVie pharmaceuticals for the Michael J. Fox Foundation for Parkinson's Research (MJFF).

Case is on the Movement Disorder Advisory Board at University of California, San Diego.

== Filmography ==
- The Routine, directed by Bob Giraldi (2001)
- Dream Begins, directed by Bob Giraldi (2002)
- Honey Trap, directed by Bob Giraldi (2005)

== Select music videography ==
- Will Smith "Just the Two of Us" (1998)
- Ricky Martin "Loaded" (2001)
