= 1998 MTV Video Music Awards =

Award ceremony

- Date: Thursday, September 10, 1998
- Location: Universal Amphitheatre, Los Angeles
- Country: United States
- Hosted by: Ben Stiller
- Most awards: Madonna (6)
- Most nominations: Madonna (9)
- Website: http://www.mtv.com/ontv/vma/past-vmas/1998/

Television/radio coverage
- Network: MTV
- Produced by: Salli Frattini
- Directed by: Beth McCarthy

The 1998 MTV Video Music Awards aired live on September 10, 1998, honoring the best music videos from June 17, 1997, to June 12, 1998. The show was hosted by Ben Stiller at Gibson Amphitheatre in Los Angeles.

Madonna was the most successful winner and nominee of the night, winning six awards out of a total nine nominations: five (out of eight) for "Ray of Light", including Video of the Year and Best Female Video, and one for "Frozen" (its only nomination). Other than Madonna, only Will Smith and The Prodigy won multiple awards that night, winning two apiece.

With regard to nominations, the two biggest nominees aside from Madonna were alt-rock band Garbage and rapper Will Smith. Smith split his nominations between two videos: "Gettin' Jiggy wit It" (five) and "Just the Two of Us" (one), each of which earned a Moonman. In contrast, Garbage received all eight nominations for "Push It" but went home completely empty-handed at the end of the night.

The mesh dress that actress Rose McGowan wore to the award show was the subject of much media attention following the awards. The dress went on to become one of the most iconic and controversial outfits in the history of the VMA's.

== Background ==
After four consecutive ceremonies in New York City, and after lobbying from the Los Angeles Sports and Entertainment Commission and the Entertainment Industry Development Corporation, MTV announced on April 9 that the 1998 Video Music Awards would be held in Los Angeles. Nominees were announced at a press conference hosted by Courtney Love, Mayor Richard Riordan, and MTV president Judy McGrath on July 14. Ben Stiller was announced as the host on August 13. The ceremony broadcast was preceded by the 1998 MTV Video Music Awards Opening Act. Hosted by Kurt Loder and Serena Altschul with reports from Chris Connelly, John Norris, and Rebecca Romijn, the broadcast featured red carpet interviews, pre-taped interviews with Madonna and Hole, a preview of the music video for Madonna's "The Power of Good-Bye," and performances from Usher and Barenaked Ladies.

In the weeks before the awards ceremony, MTV "hacked" its own website intentionally and graffitied the words "JF Was Here" across the page, at the same time that the British hacker JF was under investigation by Scotland Yard for the milw0rm hacktivist attacks. Hundreds of pages hosted on MTV.com sported the new JF logo, including one page that read, "JF was here, greets to milw0rm". MTV later confirmed that the alleged JF "hack" was a publicity stunt to promote the appearance of a commentator named Johnny Fame at their upcoming awards show. Many were puzzled by the apparent hack committed by JF since the hacker was "known for relatively high ethical standards."

== Performances ==
List of musical performances
Artist(s)	Song(s)
Pre-show
Usher	"My Way"
Barenaked Ladies	"One Week" Video of the Year Medley: "Gettin' Jiggy wit It"; "The Boy Is Mine"; "It's All About the Benjamins (Rock Remix)"; "Bitter Sweet Symphony"; "Ray of Light"
Main show
Madonna	"Shanti/Ashtangi" "Ray of Light" (featuring Lenny Kravitz)
Pras; Ol' Dirty Bastard; Mýa; Wyclef Jean; Canibus	"Gone Till November" (Wyclef Jean and Canibus only) "Ghetto Supastar (That Is What You Are)"
Hole	"Celebrity Skin" (with an excerpt from R.E.M.'s "Pretty Persuasion")
Master P Fiend; Silkk Tha Shocker; Mystikal; Mia X	"Make 'Em Say Uhh!"
Backstreet Boys	"Everybody (Backstreet's Back)"
Beastie Boys	"Three MC's and One DJ" "Intergalactic"
Brandy; Monica	"The Boy Is Mine"
Dave Matthews Band	"Stay (Wasting Time)"
Marilyn Manson	"The Dope Show"
Brian Setzer Orchestra	"Jump Jive an' Wail"

== Presenters ==
=== Pre-show ===
- Kurt Loder and Serena Altschul – presented the professional categories
- John Norris and Serena Altschul – presented Best Dance Video and Breakthrough Video

=== Main show ===
- Andy Dick and the Backstreet Boys – appeared in the opening skit
- Jerry Stiller – made a special appearance during the opening monologue
- Whitney Houston and Mariah Carey – presented Best Male Video
- Chris Rock – appeared in a taped vignette discussing "security measures" at the event
- Rupert Everett and Salma Hayek – presented Best Group Video
- Tyra Banks – introduced Pras, Ol' Dirty Bastard, Mýa, Wyclef Jean and Canibus
- Johnny Gomez and Nick Diamond (from Celebrity Deathmatch) – appeared in vignettes about the Viewer's Choice award
- Sarah Michelle Gellar and Hanson – presented Best New Artist in a Video
- Rob Thomas – introduced Hole
- Chris Tucker and Jackie Chan – presented Best Video from a Film
- Jada Pinkett Smith and Maxwell – presented Best Alternative Video
- Shaquille O'Neal – introduced Master P
- Will Smith and Tatyana Ali – presented Best Female Video
- Mark McGwire and Sammy Sosa – introduced the Backstreet Boys
- Jack Black and Puff Daddy – appeared in a parody skit of FANatic
- Jennifer Love Hewitt and Mase – presented Best Direction in a Video
- Sarah McLachlan and Natalie Imbruglia – introduced the International Viewer's Choice Awards winners
- Tori Amos and Beck – presented Best Rap Video
- Usher – introduced Brandy and Monica
- Steven Tyler, Joe Perry and David Spade – presented Viewer's Choice
- Chuck D – presented the Video Vanguard Award
- Matt Stone and Trey Parker – introduced the Dave Matthews Band
- Jennifer Lopez and Mark Wahlberg – presented Best R&B Video
- Lenny Kravitz and Gwen Stefani – presented Best Rock Video
- Geri Halliwell – presented Video of the Year
- Busta Rhymes and the Flipmode Squad – introduced the Brian Setzer Orchestra

== Winners and nominees ==
Winners are in bold text.

Video of the Year	Best Male Video
**Madonna – "Ray of Light"**; Brandy and Monica – "The Boy Is Mine"; Puff Daddy and the Family (featuring The LOX, Lil' Kim, The Notorious B.I.G. and Fuzzbubble) – "It's All About the Benjamins (Rock Remix)"; Will Smith – "Gettin' Jiggy wit It"; The Verve – "Bitter Sweet Symphony"	**Will Smith – "Just the Two of Us"**; David Bowie (featuring Trent Reznor) – "I'm Afraid of Americans (Nine Inch Nails remix)"; Busta Rhymes – "Put Your Hands Where My Eyes Could See"; Eric Clapton – "My Father's Eyes"; Brian McKnight – "Anytime"
Best Female Video	Best Group Video
**Madonna – "Ray of Light"**; Fiona Apple – "Criminal"; Mariah Carey (featuring Puff Daddy and the Family) – "Honey (Bad Boy remix)"; Natalie Imbruglia – "Torn"; Shania Twain – "You're Still the One"	**Backstreet Boys – "Everybody (Backstreet's Back)"**; Garbage – "Push It"; Matchbox 20 – "3 A.M."; Radiohead – "Karma Police"; The Verve – "Bitter Sweet Symphony"
Best New Artist in a Video	Best Rock Video
**Natalie Imbruglia – "Torn"**; Cherry Poppin' Daddies – "Zoot Suit Riot"; Chumbawamba – "Tubthumping"; Fastball – "The Way"; Mase – "Feel So Good"	**Aerosmith – "Pink"**; Foo Fighters – "Everlong"; Dave Matthews Band – "Don't Drink the Water"; Metallica – "The Unforgiven II"
Best R&B Video	Best Rap Video
**Wyclef Jean (featuring Refugee Allstars) – "Gone Till November"**; Brandy and Monica – "The Boy Is Mine"; K-Ci & JoJo – "All My Life"; Usher – "You Make Me Wanna"	**Will Smith – "Gettin' Jiggy wit It"**; Busta Rhymes – "Put Your Hands Where My Eyes Could See"; Master P (featuring Fiend, Silkk the Shocker, Mia X and Mystikal) – "Make 'Em Say Uhh!"; The Notorious B.I.G. (featuring Puff Daddy and Mase) – "Mo Money Mo Problems"; Pras (featuring Ol' Dirty Bastard and Mýa) – "Ghetto Supastar (That Is What You Are)"
Best Dance Video	Best Alternative Video
**The Prodigy – "Smack My Bitch Up"**; Backstreet Boys – "Everybody (Backstreet's Back)"; Janet Jackson – "Together Again"; Madonna – "Ray of Light"; Will Smith – "Gettin' Jiggy wit It"	**Green Day – "Good Riddance (Time of Your Life)"**; Ben Folds Five – "Brick"; Garbage – "Push It"; Radiohead – "Karma Police"; The Verve – "Bitter Sweet Symphony"
Best Video from a Film	Breakthrough Video
**Aerosmith – "I Don't Want to Miss a Thing" (from Armageddon)**; Beck – "Deadweight" (from A Life Less Ordinary); Celine Dion – "My Heart Will Go On (Love Theme from Titanic)" (from Titanic); Goo Goo Dolls – "Iris" (from City of Angels); Pras (featuring Ol' Dirty Bastard and Mýa) – "Ghetto Supastar (That Is What You Are) " (from Bulworth); Puff Daddy (featuring Jimmy Page) – "Come with Me" (from Godzilla)	**The Prodigy – "Smack My Bitch Up"**; Busta Rhymes – "Put Your Hands Where My Eyes Could See"; Garbage – "Push It"; Sean Lennon – "Home"; Madonna – "Ray of Light"; Roni Size/Reprazent – "Brown Paper Bag"
Best Direction in a Video	Best Choreography in a Video
**Madonna – "Ray of Light" (Director: Jonas Åkerlund)**; Garbage – "Push It" (Director: Andrea Giacobbe); Wyclef Jean (featuring Refugee Allstars) – "Gone Till November" (Director: Francis Lawrence); The Prodigy – "Smack My Bitch Up" (Director: Jonas Åkerlund); Radiohead – "Karma Police" (Director: Jonathan Glazer)	**Madonna – "Ray of Light" (Choreographers: Madonna and Jonas Åkerlund)**; Busta Rhymes – "Put Your Hands Where My Eyes Could See" (Choreographer: Fatima Robinson); Wyclef Jean (featuring Refugee Allstars) – "We Trying to Stay Alive" (Choreographers: Henry and Crazy Legs); Will Smith – "Gettin' Jiggy wit It" (Choreographer: Stretch)
Best Special Effects in a Video	Best Art Direction in a Video
**Madonna – "Frozen" (Special Effects: Steve Murgatroyd, Dan Williams, Steve Hiam, and Anthony Walsham)**; Aerosmith – "Pink" (Special Effects: Kevin Yagher); Aphex Twin – "Come to Daddy" (Special Effects: Chris Cunningham, Glassworks, Red, and Creature FX); Foo Fighters – "Everlong" (Special Effects: Paul Sokol and Chris W.); Garbage – "Push It" (Special Effects: Sebasten Caudron)	**Björk – "Bachelorette" (Art Director: Samantha Gore)**; Death in Vegas – "Dirt" (Art Director: Andrea Giacobbe); Foo Fighters – "Everlong" (Art Director: Bill Lakoss); Garbage – "Push It" (Art Director: Virginia Lee)
Best Editing in a Video	Best Cinematography in a Video
**Madonna – "Ray of Light" (Editor: Jonas Åkerlund)**; Aerosmith – "I Don't Want to Miss a Thing" (Editor: Chris Hafner); Garbage – "Push It" (Editor: Sylvain Connat); The Prodigy – "Smack My Bitch Up" (Editor: Jonas Åkerlund)	**Fiona Apple – "Criminal" (Director of Photography: Harris Savides)**; Garbage – "Push It" (Director of Photography: Max Malkin); Madonna – "Ray of Light" (Director of Photography: Henrik Halvarsson); Dave Matthews Band – "Don't Drink the Water" (Director of Photography: Checco Varese); Radiohead – "Karma Police" (Director of Photography: Stephen Keith-Roach)
Viewer's Choice	International Viewer's Choice: MTV Asia
**Puff Daddy and the Family (featuring The LOX, Lil' Kim, The Notorious B.I.G. and Fuzzbubble) – "It's All About the Benjamins (Rock Remix)"**; Celine Dion – "My Heart Will Go On (Love Theme from Titanic)"; Green Day – "Good Riddance (Time of Your Life)"; Matchbox 20 – "3 A.M."; Will Smith – "Gettin' Jiggy wit It"	**Chrisye – "Kala Cinta Menggoda"**; H.O.T. – "We Are the Future"; Innuendo – "Belaian Jiwa"; Kulay – "Shout"; Nicole Theriault – "Kapolo"
International Viewer's Choice: MTV Australia	International Viewer's Choice: MTV Brasil
**Kylie Minogue – "Did It Again"**; Grinspoon – "Just Ace"; Natalie Imbruglia – "Torn"; Robyn Loau – "Sick with Love"; Regurgitator – "Black Bugs"; Screamfeeder – "Hi C's"; Silverchair – "Cemetery"	**Racionais MC's – "Diário de um Detento"**; Fernanda Abreu – "Jack Soul Brasileiro"; Barão Vermelho – "Puro Êxtase"; Biquini Cavadão – "Janaína"; Charlie Brown Jr. – "Proibida pra Mim"; Cidade Negra – "Realidade Virtual"; Claudinho e Buchecha – "Quero te Encontrar"; Daúde – "Pata Pata"; Engenheiros do Hawaii – "A Montanha"; Gabriel o Pensador – "Cachimbo da Paz"; Ira! – "Eu Não Sei (Can't Explain)"; Jota Quest – "Onibusfobia"; Maskavo Roots – "Djorous"; Os Paralamas do Sucesso – "Ela Disse Adeus"; Pato Fu – "Antes Que Seja Tarde"; Planet Hemp – "Adoled (The Ocean)"; Raimundos – "Andar na Pedra"; O Rappa – "Vapor Barato"; Lulu Santos – "Hyperconectividade"; Soulfly – "Bleed"
International Viewer's Choice: MTV India	International Viewer's Choice: MTV Japan
**Lata Mangeshkar and Udit Narayan – "Dil To Pagal Hai"**; Abhijeet – "Main Koi Aisa Geet"; Asha Bhosle – "Janam Samjha Karo"; Kamaal Khan – "O Oh Jaane Jana"; A. R. Rahman – "Maa Tujhe Salaam"	**hide with Spread Beaver – "Pink Spider"**; Blankey Jet City – "Akai Tanbarin"; Luna Sea – "Storm"; Puffy – "Ai no Shirushi"; Shikao Suga – "Story"
International Viewer's Choice: MTV Latin America (North)	International Viewer's Choice: MTV Latin America (South)
**Molotov – "Gimme Tha Power"**; Aterciopelados – "Cosita Seria"; Illya Kuryaki and the Valderramas – "Jugo"; La Ley – "Fotofobia"; Plastilina Mosh – "Mr. P. Mosh"	**Molotov – "Gimme Tha Power"**; Andrés Calamaro – "Loco"; Los Fabulosos Cadillacs – "Calaveras y Diablitos"; Illya Kuryaki and the Valderramas – "Jugo"; Turf – "Casanova"
International Viewer's Choice: MTV Mandarin	
**Coco Lee – "Di Da Di"**; Black Biscuits – "Stamina"; Karen Mok – "He Doesn't Love Me"; Na Ying – "Conquer"; Power Station – "Cruel Love Letter"; David Tao – "Beside the Airport"
Michael Jackson Video Vanguard Award
**Beastie Boys**

== Artists with multiple wins and nominations ==
Artists who received multiple awards
Wins	Artist
6	Madonna
2	Aerosmith
2	Molotov
2	The Prodigy
2	Will Smith

Artists who received multiple nominations
Nominations	Artist
9	Madonna
8	Garbage
6	Will Smith
4	Aerosmith
4	Busta Rhymes
4	Radiohead
4	The Prodigy
3	Foo Fighters
3	Natalie Imbruglia
3	Puff Daddy
3	The Verve
3	Wyclef Jean
2	Backstreet Boys
2	Brandy
2	Celine Dion
2	Dave Matthews Band
2	Fiona Apple
2	Green Day
2	Illya Kuryaki and the Valderramas
2	Matchbox 20
2	Molotov
2	Monica
2	Pras

== Music Videos with multiple wins and nominations ==
Music Videos that received multiple awards
Wins	Artist	Music Video
5	Madonna	"Ray of Light"
2	Molotov	"Gimme Tha Power"
2	The Prodigy	"Smack My Bitch Up"

Music Videos that received multiple nominations
Nominations	Artist	Music Video
8	Garbage	"Push It"
8	Madonna	"Ray of Light"
5	Will Smith	"Gettin' Jiggy wit It"
4	Busta Rhymes	"Put Your Hands Where My Eyes Could See"
4	Radiohead	"Karma Police"
4	The Prodigy	"Smack My Bitch Up"
3	Foo Fighters	"Everlong"
3	Natalie Imbruglia	"Torn"
3	The Verve	"Bitter Sweet Symphony"
2	Aerosmith	"I Don't Want to Miss a Thing"
2	Aerosmith	"Pink"
2	Backstreet Boys	"Everybody (Backstreet's Back)"
2	Brandy & Monica	"The Boy Is Mine"
2	Celine Dion	"My Heart Will Go On (Love Theme from Titanic)"
2	Dave Matthews Band	"Don't Drink the Water"
2	Fiona Apple	"Criminal"
2	Green Day	"Good Riddance (Time of Your Life)"
2	Illya Kuryaki and the Valderramas	"Jugo"
2	Matchbox 20	"3 A.M."
2	Molotov	"Gimme Tha Power"
2	Pras (featuring Ol' Dirty Bastard and Mýa)	"Ghetto Supastar (That Is What You Are)"
2	Puff Daddy and the Family (featuring The LOX, Lil' Kim, The Notorious B.I.G. and Fuzzbubble)	"It's All About the Benjamins (Rock Remix)"
2	Wyclef Jean (featuring Refugee Allstars)	"Gone Till November"

== See also ==
- 1998 MTV Europe Music Awards
