= Miami (Will Smith song) =

1998 single by Will Smith

Single by Will Smith

from the album Big Willie Style
- B-side: "Just the Two of Us" (remix); "Just Cruisin'" (remix)
- Released: November 23, 1998
- Genre: R&B
- Length: 3:18
- Label: Columbia
- Songwriters: Ryan Toby; Willard Smith; Leon Sylvers III; Stephen Shockley; William Shelby
- Producers: Poke & Tone; L.E.S.

Will Smith singles chronology
"Just the Two of Us" (1998)	"Miami" (1998)	"Wild Wild West" (1999)

Music video
- "Miami" on YouTube

"Miami" is a song by American rapper and actor Will Smith from his debut solo album, Big Willie Style (1997). It samples the Whispers's 1979 single "And the Beat Goes On". Released as a single on November 23, 1998, the song charted at number 17 on the Billboard Hot 100 and number three on the UK Singles Chart.

"Miami" won the Best Male Video award at the 1999 MTV Video Music Awards. The video, which incorporates the first two verses and refrains of the selection's "radio edit" followed by the third verse and refrain of its "Miami Mix", features an early on-screen appearance of Smith's future Hitch co-star, Eva Mendes.

== Background ==
"Miami" was produced by production duo Poke and Tone, consisting of Samuel Barnes and Jean-Claude Olivier, along with L.E.S. for Will Smith's solo debut, Big Willie Style (1997). The track was developed following their work on "Men in Black," Smith's single from the soundtrack to the 1997 film of the same name, during which the producers established a close professional relationship with him that carried over into his solo project, Big Willie Style (1997). "Miami" is largely build upon a sample from the Whispers's 1979 single "And the Beat Goes On" and functions as a tribute to the city of the same name.

For the recording of "Miami," producers Barnes and Olivier sought a Spanish-speaking vocalist to deliver the phrase "Bienvenidos a Miami" in the song's introduction. They recruited the singer spontaneously while at the Hit Factory studio, approaching passersby outside the studio to find someone for the recording. While many of the women they asked were skeptical, and some initially did not believe that Smith was present, they ultimately found a vocalist who agreed to participate and contributed the line to the track.

== Critical reception ==
Larry Flick of Billboard wrote, "Smith should have no problem maintaining the momentum of his current album, "Big Willie Style", with this third single, following the ubiquitous "Gettin' Jiggy Wit It" and "Just The Two Of Us". On "Miami", he talks us up with an ode to the heat, style, and hip factor of that city. This time around, Smith employs the instrumental hook of the Whispers' 1979 single "And The Beat Goes On", which adds a classic, string-filled disco backdrop as festive as the city itself. With Smith's record on the airwaves and at the box office, as well as his appeal with younger demographics, this really is a no-brainer, now isn't it?"

== Music video ==
In the music video for the song, Smith and members of his band are freezing in Philadelphia, where it is −30 °F (−34 °C), causing a bandmate to curse Jack Frost. They hop on a plane to Miami, and are shown going around Miami in their car and various scenes morph into one another. Actress Eva Mendes appears driving a car next to Smith and his bandmates. The video ends with Will Smith and his band performing a concert, where the music changes from the original track, to its "Miami Mix" track. The video features samples from Gloria Estefan's hits "Conga" and "You'll Be Mine (Party Time)".

== Track listings ==
UK CD1

1. "Miami" (radio edit) – 3:19
2. "Miami" (Miami mix) – 4:40
3. "Miami" (Jason Nevins "Live on South Beach dub") – 5:10

UK CD2

1. "Miami" (radio edit) – 3:19
2. "Just the Two of Us" (Rodney Jerkins remix) – 4:14
3. "Just Cruisin'" (Trackmasters remix) – 4:11

UK cassette single and European CD single

1. "Miami" (radio edit) – 3:19
2. "Miami" (Miami mix) – 4:40

Australian CD single

1. "Miami" (radio edit) – 3:19
2. "Miami" (Jason Nevins Live at "54" mix) – 5:57
3. "Miami" (Miami mix) – 4:40
4. "Miami" (Jason Nevins "Live on South Beach dub") – 5:10

== Charts ==
=== Weekly charts ===
Chart (1998–1999)	Peak position
Australia (ARIA)	27
Austria (Ö3 Austria Top 40)	5
Belgium (Ultratop 50 Flanders)	14
Belgium (Ultratop 50 Wallonia)	10
Canada Top Singles (RPM)	11
Canada Dance/Urban (RPM)	6
Europe (Eurochart Hot 100)	11
Finland (Suomen virallinen lista)	8
France (SNEP)	45
Germany (GfK)	12
Hungary (Mahasz)	7
Iceland (Íslenski Listinn Topp 40)	14
Ireland (IRMA)	10
Netherlands (Dutch Top 40)	8
Netherlands (Single Top 100)	10
New Zealand (Recorded Music NZ)	4
Norway (VG-lista)	10
Poland Airplay (Music & Media)	6
Scottish Singles Sales (Official Charts)	10
Sweden (Sverigetopplistan)	5
Switzerland (Schweizer Hitparade)	4
UK Singles (Official Charts)	3
UK Hip Hop/R&B (Official Charts)	1
US Billboard Hot 100	17
US Hot R&B/Hip-Hop Songs (Billboard)	73
US Pop Airplay (Billboard)	7
US Rhythmic Airplay (Billboard)	4

=== Year-end charts ===
Chart (1998)	Position
Sweden (Hitlistan)	50
UK Singles (OCC)	51

Chart (1999)	Position
Belgium (Ultratop 50 Wallonia)	68
Canada Top Singles (RPM)	87
Canada Dance/Urban (RPM)	48
Germany (Media Control)	67
Netherlands (Dutch Top 40)	66
Netherlands (Single Top 100)	71
Sweden (Hitlistan)	95
Switzerland (Schweizer Hitparade)	19
US Billboard Hot 100	53

== Sales and certifications ==
Region	Certification	Certified units/sales
Belgium (BRMA)	Gold	25,000^{*}
Denmark (IFPI Danmark)	Platinum	90,000^{‡}
Germany (BVMI)	Gold	250,000^{‡}
Italy (FIMI) digital sales since 2009	Gold	50,000^{‡}
New Zealand (RMNZ)	Platinum	30,000^{‡}
Sweden (GLF)	Gold	15,000^{^}
United Kingdom (BPI) digital sales since 2008	2× Platinum	1,200,000^{‡}
^{*} Sales figures based on certification alone.^{^} Shipments figures based on certification alone.^{‡} Sales+streaming figures based on certification alone.

== Release history ==
Region	Date	Format(s)	Label(s)	Ref.
United States	October 6, 1998	Urban radio	Columbia	
United States	October 13, 1998	Rhythmic contemporary; contemporary hit radio	Columbia	
United Kingdom	November 23, 1998	CD; cassette	Columbia	
