= Big Willie Style =

Studio album by Will Smith
- Released: November 25, 1997
- Recorded: 1996–1997
- Studios: The Hit Factory (New York City); Right Track (New York City); A Touch of Jazz (Philadelphia, Pennsylvania); The Hacienda (Los Angeles, California); Pacifique (Los Angeles, California)
- Genres: Hip-hop; pop rap; R&B
- Length: 54:12
- Label: Columbia
- Producers: Poke & Tone (also exec.); L.E.S.; Will Smith; Jeff Townes; Keith Pelzer; Ryan Toby; Andreao Heard; Valvin Roane; Sauce

Will Smith chronology
Big Willie Style (1997)	Willennium (1999)

Singles from Big Willie Style
- 1. "Men in Black" Released: June 3, 1997; 2. "Just Cruisin'" Released: November 25, 1997 (EU); 3. "Gettin' Jiggy wit It" Released: February 10, 1998; 4. "Just the Two of Us" Released: July 20, 1998; 5. "Miami" Released: November 23, 1998

Big Willie Style is the debut solo album by American rapper and actor Will Smith. It was released on November 25, 1997, by Columbia Records. The album was primarily produced by Poke & Tone, with other contributors including L.E.S. and Smith's frequent collaborator DJ Jazzy Jeff. The album was the first to be released by Smith since 1993's Code Red, the last by the duo DJ Jazzy Jeff & the Fresh Prince. Five singles were released, including Smith's first US Billboard Hot 100 number one, "Gettin' Jiggy wit It".

After releasing five albums with DJ Jazzy Jeff, Smith turned his focus to acting and appeared in such films as Bad Boys and Independence Day before returning to the studio in 1996. The following year he starred in Men in Black, for which he recorded the song of the same name and topped the singles charts in several countries. Big Willie Style was released later in the year, reaching the top ten of the US Billboard 200, the UK Albums Chart and several other international charts.

== Recording and production ==
Recording for Big Willie Style took place mainly in New York City with producers Poke & Tone and L.E.S. – four tracks each were recorded at The Hit Factory ("Y'all Know", "Chasing Forever", "Miami" and "Just Cruisin'") and Right Track Studios ("Gettin' Jiggy wit It", "Candy", "Yes Yes Y'all" and "Big Willie Style"). Three tracks ("Don't Say Nothin'", "I Loved You" and "It's All Good") were recorded at DJ Jazzy Jeff's A Touch of Jazz Studios in Smith's hometown of Philadelphia, Pennsylvania, and "Just the Two of Us" was recorded at Pacifique Recording Studios in Los Angeles, California with producer Curtis "Sauce" Wilson. Other contributing producers were Keith Pelzer, Ryan Toby (both on "Don't Say Nothin'" and "I Love You"), Andreao Heard ("Y'all Know") and Valvin Roane ("I Loved You").

The songs on the album are broken up by a number of interludes featuring exchanges between Smith and the fictional character Keith B-Real, a "hilarious" magazine editor and motivational-tape artist. B-Real is voiced by actor Jamie Foxx. All four of the "Keith B-Real" skits (including "Intro") were recorded by Jean-Claude Olivier – Poke of Poke & Tone – at The Hacienda in Los Angeles, California, and were co-produced by Smith.

== Composition and lyrics ==
As with Smith's previous releases with DJ Jazzy Jeff, Big Willie Style showcases a radio-friendly pop-rap sound with non-explicit lyrics. Speaking about the lyrics on Big Willie Style, Jamie Hunter of Rolling Stone identified themes including multiculturalism and monogamy, commenting that Smith tells "the larger story of rap values tweaking the American dream, of how he's come to terms with the conflict between the neighborhood and the global cineplex". The musical production on Big Willie Style is focused largely around samples of disco and soul music acts from the 1980s. Artists sampled include Sister Sledge ("He's the Greatest Dancer" on "Gettin' Jiggy wit It"), Stevie Wonder ("Ribbon in the Sky" on "Chasing Forever") and The Whispers ("And the Beat Goes On" on "Miami").

== Promotion and release ==
The release of Big Willie Style was preceded by the release of the single "Men in Black" on June 3, 1997, originally released on Men in Black: The Album. The title track to the homonymous film was a commercial success, topping singles charts in Australia, Belgium, France, Germany, New Zealand, Switzerland and the United Kingdom, where it remained atop the chart for four weeks. "Just Cruisin'" was released as the album's second single on November 25, 1997, charting at number 23 on the UK Singles Chart. However, the remix is only featured on the European reissue of the album. On January 26, 1998, "Gettin' Jiggy wit It" was released on February 10, 1998, as the third single from the album to great commercial success – it became the first single by Smith to top the US Billboard Hot 100 singles chart, and also reached the top ten in numerous other regions. "Just the Two of Us" and "Miami" were released as the final two singles from the album in July and November 1998, respectively, and both enjoyed mild commercial success in the US by reaching the top 20 of the Billboard Hot 100; the singles were more successful in the UK, however, where they reached number two and number three on the UK Singles Chart, respectively.

== Reception ==
=== Commercial ===
Big Willie Style was a commercial success. Reaching a peak position of number eight on the US Billboard 200 chart, it remained on the chart for a total of 99 weeks. On the UK Albums Chart, the record entered at number 63 in December 1997, remaining in the top 100 for 29 weeks; in July the following year the album returned to the top 100, and by January 1999 it had reached its peak position of number nine. In total, the album spent 87 weeks in the UK top 100, during three separate periods. Other regions in which the album peaked in the top ten include France (#5), Norway (#8) and the Netherlands (#9). In 1999, Billboard reported that Big Willie Style had been the 39th best-selling pop album of the period between 1990 and 1999.

By July 2000, Big Willie Style had been certified nine times platinum by the Recording Industry Association of America, indicating nine million shipped units in the United States. According to Nielsen, US sales stand at six million sold copies, as of 2013. The album is also certified gold by the Australian Recording Industry Association, indicating Australian sales of over 35,000 units, double platinum by the British Phonographic Industry, indicating sales in the UK of over 600,000 units, and six times platinum by Music Canada, indicating Canadian sales of over 600,000 units.

=== Critical ===
Professional ratings
Review scores
Source	Rating
AllMusic	4/5 stars
Christgau's Consumer Guide	(choice cut)
Entertainment Weekly	C−
Music Week	4/5 stars
NME	3/10
NOW	1/5 stars
Rolling Stone	3.5/5 stars
The Source	3/5 stars
Uncut	3/5 stars

Media response to Big Willie Style was mixed. Stephen Thomas Erlewine of website AllMusic awarded the album four out of five stars, praising Smith's "trademark ... friendly, humorous pop-rap" style, which he pointed out had been modernised since his releases with DJ Jazzy Jeff. In particular, Erlewine highlighted the songs "Gettin' Jiggy wit It", "Candy", "I Loved You" and "Men in Black" as "among his best" songs. Rolling Stone writer James Hunter was similarly positive, describing the album as "wickedly well-conceived", praising the album's "delicious party jams" and noting "Gettin' Jiggy wit It" and "Yes Yes Y'All" as particular highlights. He concludes by praising the lyrical themes of the album dubbing Big Willie Style "an exceptional megacelebrity album".

Entertainment Weekly writer Jim Farber, however, slated the album, describing it as being full of "nonstop pop-rap clichés" and claiming that "The musical world suffered no great loss when Will Smith ditched rapping for acting". Village Voice critic Robert Christgau categorised the singles "Gettin' Jiggy wit It", "Just the Two of Us" and "Miami" as "good [songs] on an album that isn't worth your time or money". NME writer Andy Crysell also gave the album a negative review, calling Mr. Slappy "the Cliff Richard of rap", as well as saying that the album was "explicitly awful" with "nary a redeeming feature on show".

== Accolades and awards ==
Big Willie Style earned Smith recognition at a number of music industry awards ceremonies. At the 1997 MTV Video Music Awards, the music video for "Men in Black" won the award for Best Video from a Film, and received nominations for Best Male Video, Best Choreography and Best Special Effects. Smith won again at the 1998 MTV Video Music Awards, receiving awards for Best Male Video and Best Rap Video for "Just the Two of Us" and "Gettin' Jiggy wit It", respectively, as well as nominations for Video of the Year, Best Dance Video, Best Choreography and Viewer's Choice, all for "Gettin' Jiggy wit It". "Miami" won the award for Best Male Video and received nominations for Best Special Effects and Best Cinematography at the 1999 MTV Video Music Awards.

Smith won his third and fourth Grammy Awards for his work on Big Willie Style – "Men in Black" won the Grammy Award for Best Rap Solo Performance at the 40th Grammy Awards in February 1998, and Smith retained the award the following year at the 41st Grammy Awards, when he won for "Gettin' Jiggy wit It". At the 26th American Music Awards in January 1999, he was nominated in the categories of Favorite Pop/Rock Male Artist (which he lost to Eric Clapton) and Favorite Soul/R&B Male Artist (which he won), while the album was nominated for Favorite Pop/Rock Album and Favorite Soul/R&B Album, both of which it won. Also in 1999, Smith received three NAACP Image Awards – Entertainer of the Year, Outstanding Music Video (for "Just the Two of Us") and Outstanding Rap Artist, and was named Favorite Singer at the 1999 Kids' Choice Awards.

In 2000, music television network VH1 compiled their 100 Greatest Dance Songs list, including Smith's Big Willie Style single "Gettin' Jiggy wit It" at number 100.

== Track listing ==
No.	Title	Writer(s)	Producer(s)	Length
1.	"Intro"		Poke & Tone; Will Smith^{[a]}	1:51
2.	"Y'all Know"	Smith; Andreao Heard	Heard	3:57
3.	"Gettin' Jiggy wit It"	Smith; Samuel Barnes; Bernard Edwards; Nile Rodgers; Joe Robinson; David Porter	Poke & Tone; L.E.S.^{[a]}	3:47
4.	"Candy" (featuring Larry Blackmon and Cameo)	Smith; Ryan Toby; Larry Blackmon; Tomi Jenkins	L.E.S.; Poke & Tone	3:56
5.	"Chasing Forever"	Smith; Nasir Jones; Kenny Greene; Stevie Wonder	Poke & Tone; L.E.S.^{[a]}	4:15
6.	"Keith B-Real I" (interlude)		Poke & Tone; Smith^{[a]}	1:07
7.	"Don't Say Nothin'"	Smith; Keith Pelzer; Toby	Jeff Townes; Pelzer; Toby^{[a]}	4:22
8.	"Miami"	Smith; Barnes; Toby; William Shelby; Stephen Shockley; Leon Sylvers III	L.E.S.; Poke & Tone	3:17
9.	"Yes Yes Y'all" (featuring Camp Lo)	Smith; Jones; Ronald Isley; Rudolph Isley; O'Kelly Isley Jr.; Ernie Isley; Marvin Isley; Chris Jasper; Oliver Scott; Ronnie Wilson; Robinson; Lisa Stansfield; Ian Devaney; Andy Morris	Poke & Tone; L.E.S.^{[a]}	4:23
10.	"I Loved You"	Smith; Pelzer; Valvin Roane; Toby; Joe Farrell	Townes; Pelzer; Roane; Toby^{[a]}	4:12
11.	"Keith B-Real II" (interlude)		Poke & Tone; Smith^{[a]}	0:30
12.	"It's All Good"	Smith; Townes; Carvin Haggins; Edwards; Rodgers; Robert Bell; Ronald Bell; James Taylor; Claydes Charles Smith; George Brown; Robert Mickens; Earl Toon; Dennis Thomas; Eumir Deodato	Townes	4:04
13.	"Just the Two of Us"	Smith; Bill Withers; William Salter; Ralph MacDonald	Curtis "Sauce" Wilson	5:15
14.	"Keith B-Real III" (interlude)		Poke & Tone; Smith^{[a]}	1:54
15.	"Big Willie Style" (featuring Lisa "Left Eye" Lopes)	Smith; Jones; Timothy Riley; Maurice White; Wayne Vaughn; Wanda Vaughn	L.E.S.; Poke & Tone^{[a]}	3:35
16.	"Men in Black"	Smith; Patrice Rushen; Terry McFadden; Fred Washington	Poke & Tone	3:47
17.	"Just Cruisin'" (Remix) (European re-release)	Smith; Jones; Olivier; Barnes	Poke & Tone	4:14
Total length:				54:12

Notes

- ^{^a} signifies a co-producer
- "Intro", "Keith B-Real I", "Keith B-Real II" and "Keith B-Real III" features additional vocals by Jamie Foxx, portraying the character Keith B-Real
- "Intro" features additional vocals by Mia Pitts
- "Chasing Forever" features additional vocals by Kenny Greene and Trey Lorenz
- "Keith B-Real I" features additional vocals by Smith's wife Jada Pinkett Smith
- "I Loved You" features additional vocals by Ryan Toby and Valvin Roane
- "It's All Good" features additional vocals by Tia Mintze
- "Just the Two of Us" features additional vocals by Jeff "Fuzzy" Young and Trisha Covington
- "Men in Black" features additional vocals by Coko
- "Just Cruisin'" features additional vocals by Tichina Arnold

Sample credits

- "Gettin' Jiggy wit It" contains a sample of "He's the Greatest Dancer", written by Bernard Edwards and Nile Rodgers, and performed by Sister Sledge; a sample of "Sang and Dance", written by David Porter and performed by The Bar-Kays; and contains an interpolation of "Love Rap", written by Joe Robinson and performed by Spoonie Gee
- "Candy" contains a sample of "Candy", written by Larry Blackmon and Tomi Jenkins, and performed by Cameo
- "Chasing Forever" contains a sample of "Ribbon in the Sky", written and performed by Stevie Wonder
- "Miami" contains a sample of "And the Beat Goes On", written by William Shelby, Stephen Shockley and Leon Sylvers III, and performed by The Whispers
- "Yes Yes Y'all" contains a sample of "Here We Go Again", written by Ronald Isley, Rudolph Isley, O'Kelly Isley, Jr., Ernie Isley, Marvin Isley and Chris Jasper, and performed by The Isley Brothers; and contains an interpolation of "All Around the World", written by Lisa Stansfield, Ian Devaney and Andy Morris, and performed by Stansfield; and "Yearning for Your Love", written by Oliver Scott and Ronnie Wilson, and performed by The Gap Band; and "Love Rap", written by Joe Robinson and performed by Spoonie Gee
- "I Loved You" contains a sample of "Upon This Rock", written and performed by Joe Farrell
- "It's All Good" contains a sample of "Good Times", written by Bernard Edwards and Nile Rodgers, and performed by Chic; and contains an interpolation of "Celebration", written by Robert "Kool" Bell, Ronald Bell, James Taylor, Claydes Charles Smith, George "Funky" Brown, Robert Mickens, Earl Toon, Dennis "D.T." Thomas and Eumir Deodato, and performed by Kool & the Gang
- "Just the Two of Us" contains a sample of "Just the Two of Us", written by Bill Withers, Ralph MacDonald and William Salter, and performed by Grover Washington Jr. with Withers
- "Big Willie Style" contains a sample of "Something Special", written by Maurice White, Wayne Vaughn and Wanda Vaughn, and performed by Earth, Wind & Fire
- "Men in Black" contains a sample of "Forget Me Nots", written by Patrice Rushen, Terry McFadden and Fred Washington, and performed by Rushen
- "Just Cruisin'" (European remix version) contains a sample of "Don't Take It Personal", written by David Townsend, Derrick Culler and David Conley, and performed by Jermaine Jackson

== Personnel ==
Personnel credits adapted from liner notes.

- Rich Travali – mixing (tracks 1, 3, 4, 5, 6, 8, 11, 14, 15 and 17)
- Ken "Duro" Ifill – engineering (tracks 2, 3, 4, 5, 8, 9, 15 and 17), mixing (track 9)
- Robert Burnette – mixing assistance (tracks 5, 8, 9, 15 and 17)
- Jean-Claude "Poke" Olivier – engineering (tracks 1, 6, 11 and 14)
- Ian Dalsemer – mixing assistance (tracks 2, 7, 10, 12)
- Jonathan Pinks – mixing assistance (tracks 2, 7, 10, 12)
- Chris Ribando – mixing assistance (tracks 3, 4, 5 and 17)
- David Foreman – guitar (tracks 3, 4, 9 and 15)
- Lanar "Kern" Brantley – bass (tracks 3, 4, 9 and 15)
- Timothy "Tyme" Riley – keyboards (tracks 3, 5, 9 and 15)
- DJ Jazzy Jeff – scratches (tracks 3, 7, 9 and 12), engineering (track 12)
- Keith Winfield – keyboards (tracks 4, 8 and 17)
- Poke & Tone – drum programming (tracks 5, 9 and 16)
- Rob Chiarelli – additional drum programming (tracks 7, 10, 12), mixing (tracks 2, 7, 10, 12)
- Keith Pelzer – engineering (tracks 7, 10)
- L.E.S. – drum programming (tracks 8 and 17)
- Curtis "Sauce" Wilson – all instruments (track 13)
- Tony Maserati – mixing (track 16)
- Commissioner Gordon – mixing (track 16)

== Chart positions ==
=== Weekly charts ===
Chart (1997–99)	Peak position
Australian Albums (ARIA)	26
Austrian Albums (Ö3 Austria)	9
Belgian Albums (Ultratop Flanders)	13
Belgian Albums (Ultratop Wallonia)	26
Canadian Albums (Billboard)	13
Canadian R&B Albums (SoundScan)	1
Dutch Albums (Album Top 100)	9
French Albums (SNEP)	5
German Albums (Offizielle Top 100)	20
Hungarian Albums (MAHASZ)	40
New Zealand Albums (RMNZ)	17
Norwegian Albums (VG-lista)	8
Scottish Albums (Official Charts)	24
Swedish Albums (Sverigetopplistan)	10
Swiss Albums (Schweizer Hitparade)	21
UK Albums (Official Charts)	9
UK R&B Albums (Official Charts)	1
US Billboard 200	8
US Top R&B/Hip-Hop Albums (Billboard)	9

=== Year-end charts ===
Chart (1998)	Position
Belgian Albums (Ultratop Flanders)	70
Canada Top Albums/CDs (RPM)	24
Dutch Albums (Album Top 100)	50
French Albums (SNEP)	41
UK Albums (OCC)	34
US Billboard 200	8
US Top R&B/Hip-Hop Albums (Billboard)	20

Chart (1999)	Position
Belgian Albums (Ultratop Flanders)	81
French Albums (SNEP)	49
UK Albums (OCC)	63
US Billboard 200	28
US Top R&B/Hip-Hop Albums (Billboard)	60

== Certifications ==
Region	Certification	Certified units/sales
Australia (ARIA)	Gold	35,000^{^}
Belgium (BRMA)	Gold	25,000^{*}
Canada (Music Canada)	6× Platinum	600,000^{^}
France (SNEP)	2× Gold	200,000^{*}
Netherlands (NVPI)	Gold	50,000^{^}
New Zealand (RMNZ)	Platinum	15,000^{^}
Norway (IFPI Norway)	Gold	25,000^{*}
Sweden (GLF)	Gold	40,000^{^}
Switzerland (IFPI Switzerland)	Gold	25,000^{^}
United Kingdom (BPI)	2× Platinum	600,000^{^}
United States (RIAA)	9× Platinum	9,000,000^{^}
Summaries
Europe (IFPI)	2× Platinum	2,000,000^{*}
^{*} Sales figures based on certification alone.^{^} Shipments figures based on certification alone.
