= Robert Caruso =

American director

Robert Caruso is a director and executive producer of commercials, music videos and branded content.

Early in his career, Caruso co-founded Commotion Pictures, a San Francisco-based film production company, with Andrew Linsk. There, he directed music videos and began his commercial career. In addition, he represented a roster of directors and shared Executive Producer responsibilities. His music industry clients and artists included Warner's Green Day, A&M's Soundgarden, Virgin's John Lee Hooker, Columbia's Public Enemy, and Island's PJ Harvey. Work for ad agency clients included commercial spots for: Sega, Time Warner, Taco Bell, and Levi Strauss. Commotion produced brand films for Pacific Bell, Sega, Crystal Dynamics and others.

After leaving Commotion Pictures, Caruso was recruited to Industrial Light & Magic (ILM), George Lucas's special effects company. With ILM's Commercial Production (ILMCP) division, he directed spots for Coors, DirecTV, Disney, Kraft, Motorola, and Sprint He directed three music video titles for actor/musician Will Smith, winning awards for "Men In Black" and "Will2K". In collaboration with ILM's Academy Award-winning animators and special effects artists, he directed several character animation projects. Robert garnered many industry honors at ILMCP including a Clio, London International Advertising Award, Anicom Animation award, MTV Award, Billboard Magazine Award and Grammy nomination.

Following his work at Industrial Light & Magic Caruso directed through commercial production companies HKM Films and later Rhythm and Hues Studios. Caruso currently works as Director and Executive Producer out of the San Francisco-based film production company, Caruso Company.

Caruso's collaborations include film, music, and sports talent – creating memorable work with celebrities, as varied as actors James Earl Jones, Will Smith, Arnold Schwarzenegger, America Ferrera, and Jamie Foxx or sports figures, such as baseball great Hunter Pence, skateboarder Tony Hawk, basketball star Shaquille O'Neal, and hockey legend Wayne Gretzky.

== Video ==
- Early Green Day music video Co-Executive Producer by Robert Caruso, "Longview"
- "Men In Black" music video (director)
- "Just Cruisin'" music video, starring Will Smith, (director)
