= Fuzzbubble =

American rock band

- Origin: Long Island, New York, United States
- Genres: Rock, power pop
- Years active: 1995–2001, 2022–present
- Labels: Royalty; Bad Boy; Orchard; Arista; Epic
- Members: Jim Bacchi; Mark DiCarlo; Jason Camiolo
- Past members: Brett Rothfeld

Fuzzbubble is an American rock/power pop band from Long Island, New York, active from 1995 to 2001 and again since 2022. Its original lineup consisted of Jim Bacchi on guitar, Mark DiCarlo on vocals, Jason Camiolo on drums, and Brett Rothfeld on bass. They were signed by Sean Combs' Bad Boy Records. In 1997, they contributed to a rock remix of Puff Daddy's song "It's All About the Benjamins". A year later, their track "Out There" appeared on the soundtrack to the film Godzilla, and they performed on the song "Nowhere to Run (Vapor Trail)" from the soundtrack to South Park, after which they left Bad Boy Records. During their career, the group released two albums: Fuzzbubble (2000) and Demos, Outtakes and Rarities (2002). Their self-titled debut was produced by Mike Clink and featured guest appearances from the Bangles' Susanna Hoffs, and Roger Joseph Manning Jr. from Jellyfish. Rothfeld died by suicide in 2021. Fuzzbubble released the album Cult Stars from Mars in 2022.

== Band members ==
Current

- Mark DiCarlo – vocals
- Jim Bacchi – guitar
- Jason Camiolo – drums

Past

- Brett Rothfeld – bass (died in 2021)

== Discography ==
- Fuzzbubble (2000)
- Demos, Outtakes and Rarities (2002)
- Cult Stars from Mars (2022)
