= MTV Video Music Award for Best Male Video =

Annual music video award

- Awarded for: Male music videos
- Country: United States
- Presented by: MTV
- First award: 1984
- Final award: 2016

Highlights
- Most awards: Eminem (3)
- Most nominations: Eminem (9)
- Website: VMA website

The MTV Video Music Award for Best Male Video was one of four original general awards that have been handed out every year since the first MTV Video Music Awards in 1984. In 2007, though, the award was briefly renamed Male Artist of the Year, and it awarded the artist's whole body of work for that year rather than a specific video. However, the award returned to its original name the following year. It was replaced by the Artist of the Year category in 2017, combining Best Male and Best Female video categories.

With three victories, Eminem is the artist with most wins in this category, and also has the most nominations with nine. Meanwhile, Tom Petty, Beck, Will Smith, Justin Timberlake and Chris Brown, all have won this twice, with the first three being the only artists to win the award for two consecutive years.

Gwen Stefani was the first female artist to win this award as she was featured and credited on the win for 'South Side' by Moby in 2001.

== Recipients ==
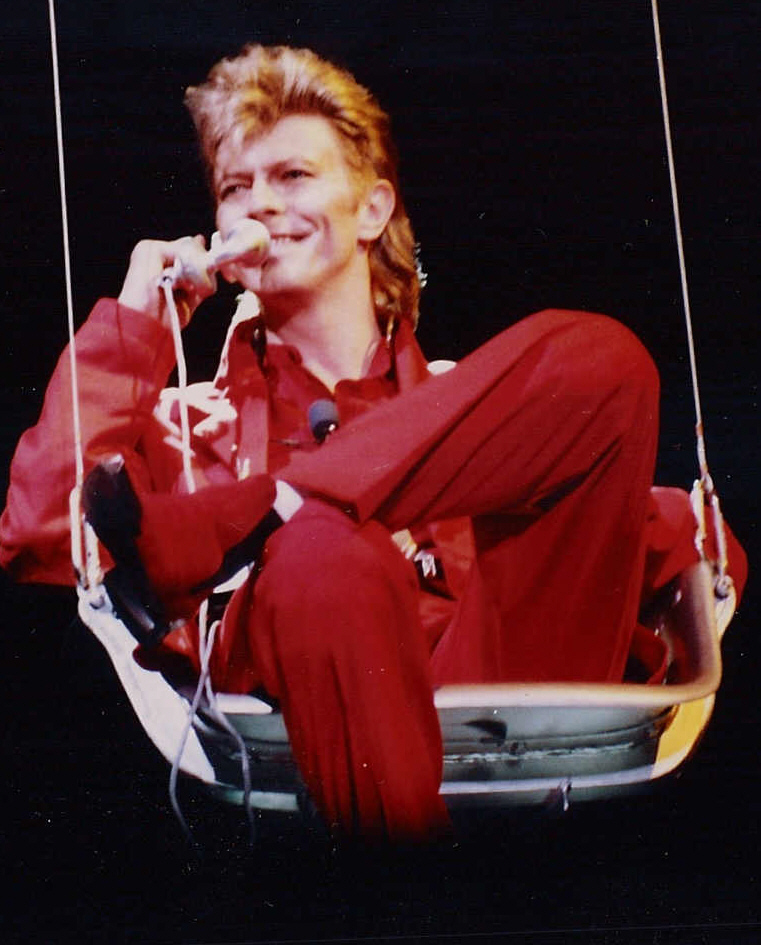
Inaugural winner David Bowie pictured in 1987

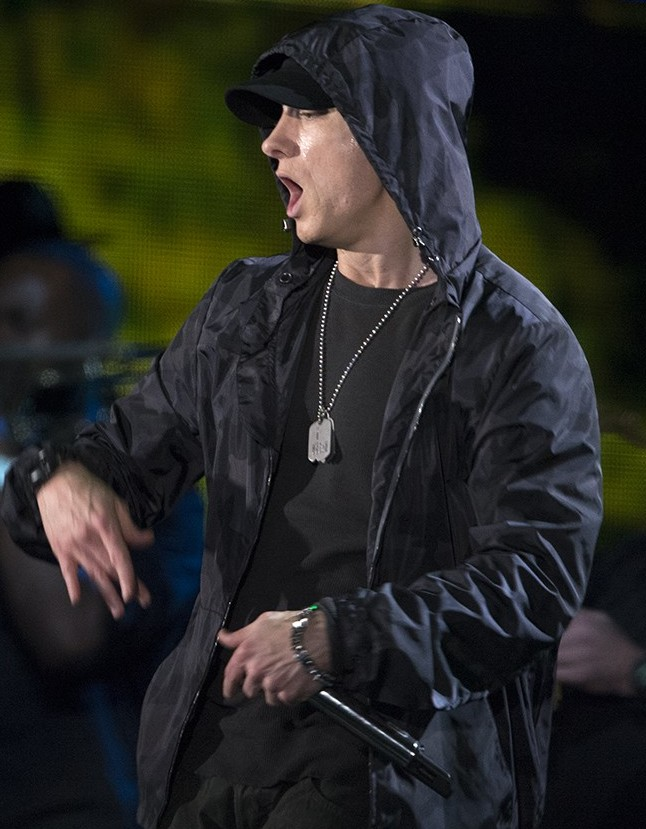
Eminem is the artist with most wins (3) and nominations (9)

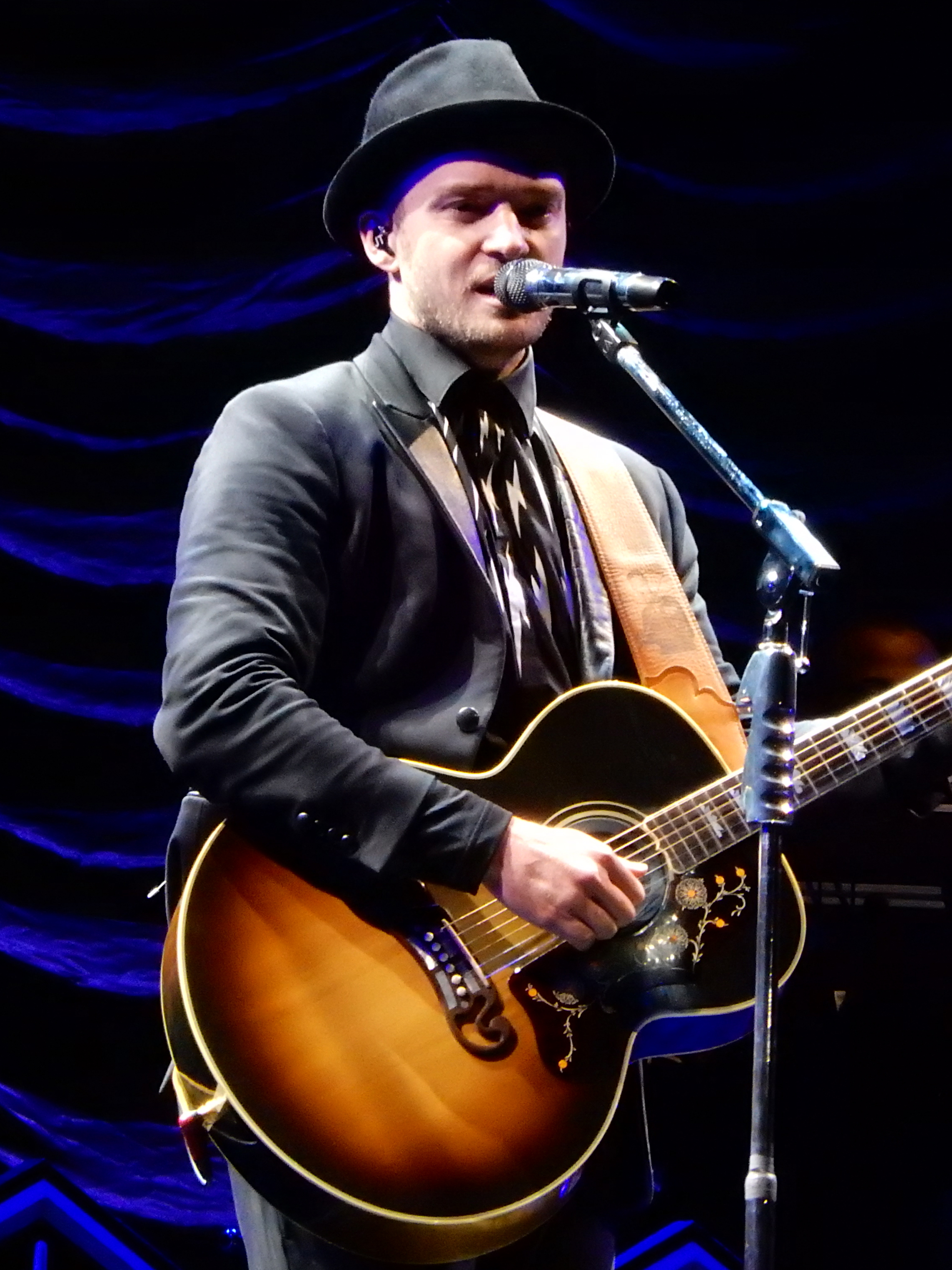
Justin Timberlake has won the award twice

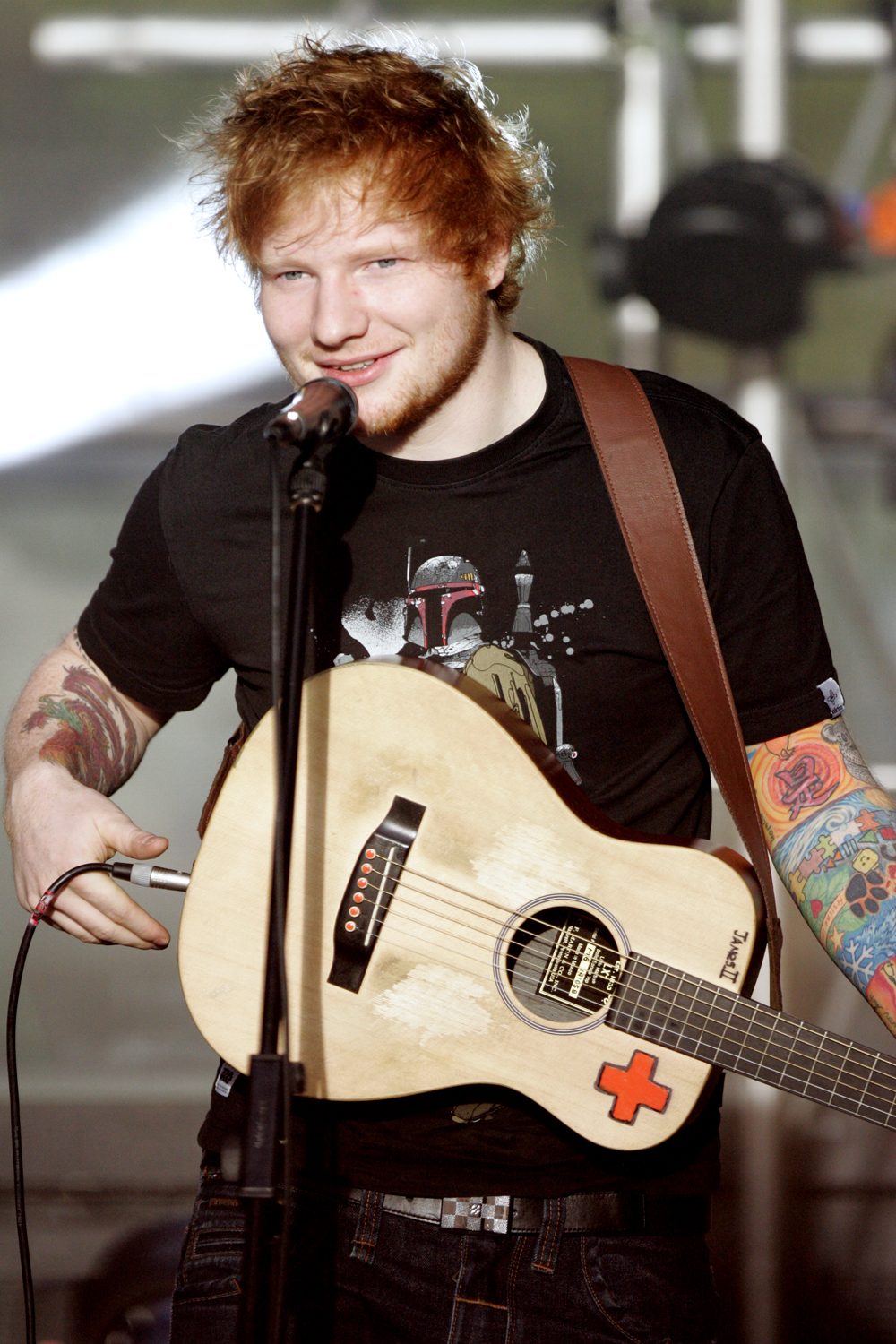
The 2014 winner Ed Sheeran

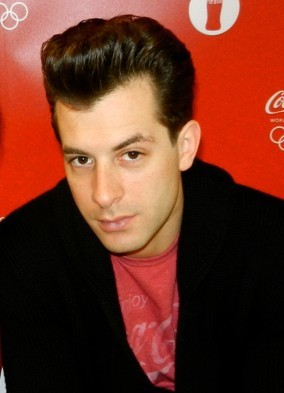
The 2015 winner Mark Ronson

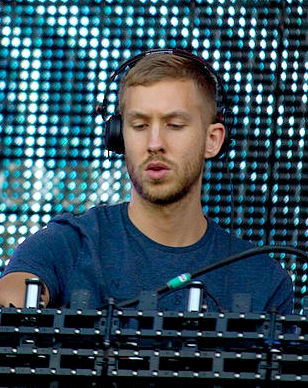
The 2016 winner Calvin Harris

Key
†	Marks winners of the MTV Video Music Award for Video of the Year
*	Marks nominees of the MTV Video Music Award for Video of the Year

Year	Winner(s)	Nominees	Ref.
1984	David Bowie — "China Girl"	Herbie Hancock * — "Rockit" *; Michael Jackson * — "Thriller" *; Billy Joel — "Uptown Girl"; Lionel Richie — "All Night Long (All Night)"	
1985	Bruce Springsteen — "I'm on Fire"	Glenn Frey — "Smuggler's Blues"; Don Henley † — "The Boys of Summer" †; David Lee Roth * — "California Girls" *; David Lee Roth * — "Just a Gigolo/I Ain't Got Nobody" *	
1986	Robert Palmer * — "Addicted to Love" *	Bryan Adams — "Summer of '69"; Phil Collins — "Take Me Home"; Bruce Springsteen — "Glory Days"; Sting — "If You Love Somebody Set Them Free"	
1987	Peter Gabriel † — "Sledgehammer" †	David Bowie — "Day-In Day-Out"; Robert Palmer — "I Didn't Mean to Turn You On"; Paul Simon — "You Can Call Me Al"; Steve Winwood * — "Higher Love" *	
1988	Prince — "U Got the Look"	Terence Trent D'Arby — "Wishing Well"; George Harrison — "Got My Mind Set on You"; Bruce Springsteen * — "Tunnel of Love" *; Steve Winwood — "Back in the High Life Again"	
1989	Elvis Costello — "Veronica"	Bobby Brown — "Every Little Step"; Lou Reed — "Dirty Blvd."; Steve Winwood * — "Roll with It" *	
1990	Don Henley * — "The End of the Innocence" *	Billy Idol — "Cradle of Love"; MC Hammer — "U Can't Touch This"; Michael Penn — "No Myth"	
1991	Chris Isaak * — "Wicked Game (Concept)" *	Jon Bon Jovi — "Blaze of Glory"; Gerardo — "Rico Suave"; George Michael — "Freedom! '90"	
1992	Eric Clapton — "Tears in Heaven (Performance)"	John Mellencamp — "Get a Leg Up"; Tom Petty and the Heartbreakers — "Into the Great Wide Open"; Bruce Springsteen — "Human Touch"; "Weird Al" Yankovic — "Smells Like Nirvana"	
1993	Lenny Kravitz — "Are You Gonna Go My Way"	Peter Gabriel — "Steam"; George Michael — "Killer/Papa Was a Rollin' Stone"; Sting — "If I Ever Lose My Faith in You"	
1994	Tom Petty and the Heartbreakers — "Mary Jane's Last Dance"	Beck — "Loser"; Tony Bennett — "Steppin' Out with My Baby"; Bruce Springsteen — "Streets of Philadelphia"	
1995	Tom Petty — "You Don't Know How It Feels"	Chris Isaak — "Somebody's Crying"; Elton John — "Believe"; Lucas — "Lucas with the Lid Off"	
1996	Beck — "Where It's At"	Bryan Adams — "The Only Thing That Looks Good on Me Is You"; Coolio — "1, 2, 3, 4 (Sumpin' New)"; R. Kelly (featuring Ronald Isley) — "Down Low (Nobody Has to Know)"; Seal — "Don't Cry"	
1997	Beck — "Devils Haircut"	Babyface — "Every Time I Close My Eyes"; R. Kelly — "I Believe I Can Fly"; Will Smith — "Men in Black"	
1998	Will Smith — "Just the Two of Us"	David Bowie (featuring Trent Reznor) — "I'm Afraid of Americans (Nine Inch Nails remix)"; Busta Rhymes — "Put Your Hands Where My Eyes Could See"; Eric Clapton — "My Father's Eyes"; Brian McKnight — "Anytime"	
1999	Will Smith — "Miami"	Eminem — "My Name Is"; Lenny Kravitz — "Fly Away"; Ricky Martin * — "Livin' la Vida Loca" *	
2000	Eminem † — "The Real Slim Shady" †	D'Angelo * — "Untitled (How Does It Feel)" *; Kid Rock — "Cowboy"; Ricky Martin — "Shake Your Bon-Bon"; Moby — "Natural Blues"	
2001	Moby (featuring Gwen Stefani) — "South Side"	Eminem (featuring Dido) * — "Stan" *; Lenny Kravitz — "Again"; Nelly — "Ride wit Me"; Robbie Williams — "Rock DJ"	
2002	Eminem † — "Without Me" †	Craig David — "Walking Away"; Enrique Iglesias — "Hero"; Elton John — "This Train Don't Stop There Anymore"; Nelly — "#1"; Usher — "U Got It Bad"	
2003	Justin Timberlake * — "Cry Me a River" *	50 Cent * — "In da Club" *; Johnny Cash * — "Hurt" *; Eminem * — "Lose Yourself" *; John Mayer — "Your Body Is a Wonderland"	
2004	Usher (featuring Lil Jon and Ludacris) * — "Yeah!" *	Jay-Z * — "99 Problems" *; Prince — "Musicology"; Justin Timberlake — "Señorita"; Kanye West (featuring Syleena Johnson) — "All Falls Down"	
2005	Kanye West * — "Jesus Walks" *	50 Cent — "Candy Shop"; Beck — "E-Pro"; John Legend — "Ordinary People"; Usher — "Caught Up"	
2006	James Blunt — "You're Beautiful"	Busta Rhymes (featuring Mary J. Blige, Rah Digga, Missy Elliott, Lloyd Banks, Papoose, and DMX) — "Touch It (Remix)"; Nick Lachey — "What's Left of Me"; T.I. — "What You Know"; Kanye West (featuring Jamie Foxx) — "Gold Digger"	
2007	Justin Timberlake *	Akon; Robin Thicke; T.I.; Kanye West *	
2008	Chris Brown — "With You"	Flo Rida (featuring T-Pain) — "Low"; Lil Wayne (featuring Static Major) — "Lollipop"; T.I. — "No Matter What"; Usher (featuring Young Jeezy) — "Love in This Club"	
2009	T.I. (featuring Rihanna) — "Live Your Life"	Eminem * — "We Made You" *; Jay-Z — "D.O.A. (Death of Auto-Tune)"; Ne-Yo — "Miss Independent"; Kanye West * — "Love Lockdown" *	
2010	Eminem * — "Not Afraid" *	B.o.B (featuring Hayley Williams) * — "Airplanes" *; Jason Derulo — "In My Head"; Drake — "Find Your Love"; Usher (featuring will.i.am) — "OMG"	
2011	Justin Bieber — "U Smile"	Eminem (featuring Rihanna) — "Love the Way You Lie"; Cee-Lo Green — "Fuck You"; Bruno Mars * — "Grenade" *; Kanye West (featuring Rihanna and Kid Cudi) — "All of the Lights"	
2012	Chris Brown — "Turn Up the Music"	Justin Bieber — "Boyfriend"; Drake (featuring Rihanna) * — "Take Care" *; Frank Ocean — "Swim Good"; Usher — "Climax"	
2013	Bruno Mars * — "Locked Out of Heaven" *	Kendrick Lamar — "Swimming Pools (Drank)"; Ed Sheeran — "Lego House"; Robin Thicke (featuring T.I. and Pharrell) * — "Blurred Lines" *; Justin Timberlake † — "Mirrors" †	
2014	Ed Sheeran (featuring Pharrell Williams) — "Sing"	Eminem (featuring Rihanna) — "The Monster"; John Legend — "All of Me"; Sam Smith — "Stay with Me"; Pharrell Williams * — "Happy" *	
2015	Mark Ronson (featuring Bruno Mars) * — "Uptown Funk" *	Nick Jonas — "Chains"; Kendrick Lamar * — "Alright" *; Ed Sheeran * — "Thinking Out Loud" *; The Weeknd — "Earned It"	
2016	Calvin Harris (featuring Rihanna) — "This Is What You Came For"	Drake * — "Hotline Bling" *; Bryson Tiller — "Don't"; The Weeknd — "Can't Feel My Face"; Kanye West * — "Famous" *	

== Statistics ==
=== Multiple Wins ===
3 wins

- Eminem

2 wins

- Will Smith
- Beck
- Justin Timberlake
- Chris Brown
- Bruno Mars

=== Multiple Nominations ===
9 nominations

- Eminem

7 nominations

- Kanye West

6 nominations

- Usher

5 nominations

- Tom Petty
- T.I.
- Bruce Springsteen

4 nominations

- Justin Timberlake

3 nominations

- Steve Winwood
- Will Smith
- David Bowie
- Lenny Kravitz
- Ed Sheeran
- Pharrell Williams
- Bruno Mars

2 nominations

- Don Henley
- David Lee Roth
- Robert Palmer
- Bryan Adams
- Sting
- Peter Gabriel
- Prince
- Chris Isaak
- George Michael
- Eric Clapton
- Elton John
- R. Kelly
- Busta Rhymes
- Ricky Martin
- Moby
- Nelly
- 50 Cent
- Jay-Z
- John Legend
- Justin Bieber
- Chris Brown

== See also ==
- MTV Europe Music Award for Best Male
