= We Just Wanna Party with You =

Single by Snoop Doggy Dogg featuring Jermaine Dupri

from the album Men in Black: The Album
- Released: August 23, 1997 (UK)
- Recorded: 1997
- Genre: Hip-hop; R&B; funk
- Length: 4:32
- Label: Columbia; Sony Records
- Songwriters: Calvin Broadus; Jermaine Mauldin; Robert Bell; Dennis Thomas; Otha Nash; Larry Gittens; Ronald Bell; George Brown; Claydes Smith; Robert Mickens; Eumir Deodato; James Taylor
- Producer: Jermaine Dupri

Snoop Doggy Dogg singles chronology
"Midnight Love" (1997)	"We Just Wanna Party with You" (1997)	"Still a G Thang" (1998)

Jermaine Dupri singles chronology
"We Just Wanna Party with You" (1997)	"Imagination" (1998)

"We Just Wanna Party with You" is the European single by American rapper Snoop Doggy Dogg featuring fellow American rapper Jermaine Dupri from Men in Black: The Album released in 1997.

It was the first collaboration of Snoop and Dupri, that was followed by "Protectors of 1472", "Bow Wow (That's My Name)" and "Welcome to Atlanta (Coast to Coast Remix)".

It was also Snoop's first single outside Death Row as being a single from an album released by Columbia/Sony and produced by JD. It was also his only non-Death Row track to be released under his alternative stage name (after this, he would drop the "Doggy" in his name). Singer Trey Lorenz is featured on the chorus of the song.

It only had a minor success out of the United States (where it had none, only the album charted), particularly in Australia where it stayed 17 weeks on the chart until the next year leaving the top 100 in the first week of February 1998.

The song samples Kool and the Gang's 1982 hit single "Get Down on It". The lyrics include a reference to the 1996 movie The Nutty Professor.

== Charts ==
Chart (1997)	Peark position
Germany (GfK)	82
Australia (ARIA)	28
Belgium (Ultratop 50 Flanders)	7
New Zealand (Recorded Music NZ)	10
Scottish Singles Sales (Official Charts)	37
UK Hip Hop/R&B (Official Charts)	8
UK Singles (Official Charts Company)	21
US R&B/Hip-Hop Airplay (Billboard)	58
