= Hittman (band) =

American heavy metal band

- Origin: New York, U.S.
- Genres: Power metal, heavy metal, progressive metal
- Years active: 1984–1994, 2017–present
- Labels: No Remorse, Steamhammer/SPV
- Members: Jim Bacchi; Dirk Kennedy; John Inglima; Greg Bier; Joe Fugazi
- Past members: Mike Buccel; Chuck Khoury; Scott Knight; Don Fair; Greg Walls; Mark Jenkins; Jai Es; Nick Mitchell
- Website: Hittman on Facebook

Hittman is an American heavy metal band from New York, originally active from 1984 to 1994 and again since 2017.

== History ==
In September 1984, guitarist Jim Bachi, bassist Mike Buccel, drummer Chuck Kory and vocalist Scott Knight came together from various local New York bands to form Hittman in Huntington on Long Island. After a few months, they parted ways with Knight, who was deemed not good enough for the band. They recruited Dirk Kennedy, who had been involved in the formation of popular thrash metal band Anthrax. A little later, the group added second guitarist Brian Fair to the formation. In June 1985, they produced the demo Metal Sport. With the rehearsed material, they opened shows for Saxon, Poison, Black 'n Blue and Stryper, among others. Fair was let go in 1986 and was replaced by Greg Walls who in turn was replaced by John Kristen later on. Around 1986, a second demo was distributed to a select group of people in the music industry. After that, months passed in conducting ineffective talks with several record labels.

In August 1988, Hittman's self-titled debut album was released on German label Steamhammer, which had picked up in March, although only the song of the same name from the demo Metal Sport made it onto the album. Also included was a cover version of the Johnny Rivers television series tune "Secret Agent Man". For American metal listeners, Hittman's attachment to the label, which was again based only in Germany after a failed overseas expansion, was an obstacle, as they could only access the album via import. In AllMusic's interpretation, this stalled the band's career, which in turn delayed the production of a second album. In contrast, the Encyclopedia of Popular Music argues that internal group tensions delayed the preparation of the second album. Dirk Kennedy explained it with the circumstance that negotiations with American label Polygram Records were initially problematic because of the required takeover of the debut album, which in the meantime had been licensed extremely successfully by Roadracer Records, and that Steamhammer reacted angrily to the poaching attempt, and that because of personnel changes within the responsible Polygram department, this company also dropped out, which is why a stay with Steamhammer was necessary. As a result of the legal trouble around the label affiliation, the band's upward trend faltered and the management dropped them. Production for the band's next release, Precision Killing, a concept album in the vein of Queensrÿche's Operation Mindcrime, was stopped, as the band wanted to avoid constant comparisons to them.

With new drummer Mark Jenkins, the album Vivas Machina was instead tackled in November 1991, completed in May 1992, mixed in July, announced for August 1992, and released in the last days of January 1993. As an explanation, Kennedy stated that producer Bob St. John had to handle several jobs at the same time, including the priority production of the Extreme CD III Sides to Every Story. Some of the performances following the release were poorly attended. At a gig in May 1993 together with Skew Siskin and Sargant Fury at the Erlangen E-Werk, which holds about 900 visitors, only about 40 people were present. Meanwhile, the band had already written the first songs for a third album, which again had a heavier touch. A tour was still pulled off, but due to sagging sales at a high financial cost the band broke up in 1994.

In 2004, Kennedy recorded the solo album Life Is Now. In 2007, there were plans for a revival of Hittman, which were to culminate in a performance at the twelfth Keep It True festival. The performance was canceled due to a family bereavement that was not described in detail. On November 11, 2013, Mike Buccell was killed in an accident.

The band reissued their self-titled debut album via No Remorse Records in October 2017, which included a remixed and remastered version of their original 1985 demo album. They have since reunited and played their first comeback concert in April 2018 at Blackthorn 51 in Elmhurst, New York. The band released a new studio album, Destroy All Humans, in September 2020.

== Members ==
- Jim Bacchi – guitars (1984–1994, 2017–present)
- Dirk Kennedy – vocals (1984–1994, 2017–present)
- John Inglima – guitars (1986–1994, 2017–present)
- Greg Bier – bass (2018–present)
- Joe Fugazi – drums (2019–present)

Former members

- Mike Buccel – bass (1984–1994; died 2013)
- Chuck Khoury – drums (1984–1991, 2017–2018)
- Scott Knight – vocals (1984)
- Don Flair – guitars (1985–1986)
- Greg Walls – guitars (1986)
- Mark Jenkins – drums (1991–1994)
- Jai Es – drums (2018–2019)
- Nick Mitchell – bass

== Discography ==
Studio albums

- 1988: Hittman (Steamhammer/SPV)
- 1993: Vivas Machina (Steamhammer/SPV)
- 2020: Destroy All Humans (Future Primitive/No Remorse Records)

Other releases

- 1985: Metal Sport (demo)
- 1988: "Will You Be There" (promo single, Steamhammer/SPV)
- 1993: "Words" (single, Steamhammer/SPV)
