= Men in Black: The Album =

1997 soundtrack album

Soundtrack album by various artists
- Released: July 1, 1997
- Recorded: 1996–1997
- Genres: Hip hop; R&B
- Length: 66:05
- Labels: Columbia; Sony
- Producers: Poke & Tone; Jermaine Dupri; Jonathan "Mookie" Morant; Deconzo Smith; Jerome Malcolm; Bob Mare; The Ummah; De La Soul; Branford Marsalis

Singles from Men in Black: The Album
- 1. "Men in Black" Released: June 3, 1997 (US); 2. "Escobar '97" Released: July 1, 1997; 3. "We Just Wanna Party with You" Released: August 23, 1997 (UK); 4. "Just Cruisin'" Released: November 25, 1997 (EU)

Professional ratings
Review scores
Source	Rating
AllMusic	link
Uncut	4/5 stars

Men in Black: The Album is a soundtrack album to the film Men in Black, released on July 1, 1997. Distributed by Columbia Records, the album featured production from producers such as Poke & Tone, Jermaine Dupri and The Ummah.

The album was a success, spending two consecutive weeks at number one on the Billboard 200 and reaching the top ten in Australia, Austria, Canada, the Netherlands, France, Germany and New Zealand. The RIAA certified the album 3× Platinum for shipments of over three million copies in the United States.

Four singles were released from the album, Will Smith's "Men in Black", Nas's "Escobar '97", Jermaine Dupri and Snoop Dogg's "We Just Wanna Party with You" and "Just Cruisin'" by Smith. Except for "Men in Black" and the two Danny Elfman cues, none of the album's tracks are in the film.

The soundtrack also marked the debuts of then-unknown singer Alicia Keys and girl group Destiny's Child.

== Track listing ==
No.	Title	Writer(s)	Producer(s)	Length
1.	"Men in Black" (Will Smith)	Smith, Patrice Rushen, Terry McFadden & Fred Washington	Poke and Tone	3:46
2.	"We Just Wanna Party with You" (Snoop Doggy Dogg featuring Jermaine Dupri)	Jermaine Dupri, Robert Bell, Claydes Smith, Calvin Broadus, James Taylor, George Brown, Ronald Bell, Robert Mickens, Eumir Deodato, Richard Westfield, Otha Nash, Larry Gittens, Dennis Thomas	Dupri	4:32
3.	"I'm Feeling' You" (Ginuwine)	Elgin "Ginuwine" Lumpkin & Jonathan "Mookie" Morant	Mookie	4:40
4.	"Dah Dee Dah (Sexy Thing)" (Alicia Keys)	Alicia Keys, Taneisha Smith & Reese Johnson	Johnson	4:12
5.	"Just Cruisin'" (Will Smith)	Smith, Nasir "Nas" Jones & Kenneth Stover	Poke and Tone	3:59
6.	"The 'Notic" (The Roots featuring D'Angelo)	Tariq Collins, Ahmir "Questlove" Thompson, James Poyser, Larry Dunn, Maurice White & Philip Bailey	Scott Storch (The Roots), Poyser & Kelo	5:20
7.	"Make You Happy" (Trey Lorenz)	Mariah Carey, Lorenz, Cory Rooney	Carey & Rooney	4:06
8.	"Escobar '97" (Nas)	Jones, Samuel Barnes, Jean-Claude Olivier, Jerry Ragovoy & Aaron Schroeder	Poke and Tone	3:32
9.	"Erotik City" (Emoja)	T. Footman, E. Taylor & T. Wimbley	Deconzo Smith & Jerome Malcolm	4:34
10.	"Same Ol' Thing" (A Tribe Called Quest)	Kamaal "Q-Tip" Fareed, Ali Shaheed Muhammad & Malik "Phife Dawg" Taylor	The Ummah	4:27
11.	"Killing Time" (Destiny's Child)	Dwayne Wiggins & Taura Stinson	Wiggins	5:08
12.	"Waiting For Love" (3T)	John Howcott, Emanuel Officer & Donald Parks	Craig Burbidge	3:47
13.	"Chanel No. Fever" (De La Soul)	Kelvin "Posdnuos" Mercer, David "Dave" Jolicoeur & Vincent "Maseo" Mason	De La Soul	3:24
14.	"Some Cow Fonque (More Tea, Vicar?)" (Buckshot LeFonque)	Branford Marsalis	Marsalis	5:10
15.	"M.I.B. Main Theme" (Danny Elfman)	Elfman		2:58
16.	"M.I.B. Closing Theme" (Danny Elfman)	Elfman		2:38
Total length:				66:05

=== Sample credits ===
- "Men in Black" features a sample from "Forget Me Nots" by Patrice Rushen written by Patrice Rushen, Terry McFadden and Fred Washington
- "We Just Wanna Party with You" contains portions of "Get Down On It" by Kool & the Gang written by Robert Bell, James Taylor, George Brown, Ronald Bell, Claydes Smith, Robert Mickens and E. Deodato
- "Just Cruisin'" contains a sample of "I'm Back For More" by Al Johnson written by Kenneth Stover
- "The 'Notic" contains replayed elements of "Shining Star" by Earth, Wind & Fire written by Larry Dunn, Maurice White and Philip Bailey
- "Escobar '97" contains a sample of "I'll Move You No Mountain" by The Love Unlimited Orchestra written by Jerry Ragovoy and Aaron Schroeder
- "Same Ol' Thing" contains a sample of "Miles Beyond" by The Mahavishnu Orchestra written by J. McLaughlin

== Charts ==
=== Weekly charts ===
Chart (1997)	Peak position
Australian Albums (ARIA)	4
Austrian Albums (Ö3 Austria)	3
Belgian Albums (Ultratop Flanders)	20
Belgian Albums (Ultratop Wallonia)	21
Canadian Albums (Billboard)	3
Dutch Albums (Album Top 100)	10
Finnish Albums (Suomen virallinen lista)	27
French Albums (SNEP)	9
German Albums (Offizielle Top 100)	6
Hungarian Albums (MAHASZ)	9
New Zealand Albums (RMNZ)	2
Norwegian Albums (VG-lista)	21
Swedish Albums (Sverigetopplistan)	17
Swiss Albums (Schweizer Hitparade)	12
US Billboard 200	1
US Top R&B/Hip-Hop Albums (Billboard)	2

=== Year-end charts ===
Chart (1997)	Position
Australian Albums (ARIA)	45
Austrian Albums (Ö3 Austria)	32
German Albums (Offizielle Top 100)	60
New Zealand Albums (RMNZ)	34
US Billboard 200	19
US Top R&B/Hip-Hop Albums (Billboard)	42

Chart (1998)	Position
US Billboard 200	80

== Certifications and sales ==
Region	Certification	Certified units/sales
Australia (ARIA)	Platinum	70,000^{^}
Canada (Music Canada)	3× Platinum	300,000^{^}
New Zealand (RMNZ)	Platinum	15,000^{^}
Switzerland (IFPI Switzerland)	Gold	25,000^{^}
United Kingdom (BPI)	Gold	100,000^{^}
United States (RIAA)	3× Platinum	3,100,000
Summaries
Worldwide	—	5,000,000
^{^} Shipments figures based on certification alone.

== Men in Black: The Score ==
Men in Black: The Score

Soundtrack album by Danny Elfman

Columbia Records released a Danny Elfman score album, including the two tracks included on Men in Black: The Album, on December 1, 1997.

=== Track listing ===
All music is composed by Danny Elfman.

No.	Title	Length
1.	"M.I.B. Main Theme"	2:58
2.	"D's Memories/Chase"	3:57
3.	"Edgar's Truck/A New Man"	2:58
4.	"Imports/Quiet Moment"	2:22
5.	"J Contemplates"	1:18
6.	"Headquarters"	1:13
7.	"The Suit"	1:28
8.	"Morgue Time"	0:49
9.	"Petit Mort"	1:42
10.	"K Reminisces"	0:48
11.	"Orion's Belt/Cat Stinger"	2:18
12.	"Noisy Cricket/Impending Trouble"	2:08
13.	"Sexy Morgue Babe/Icon"	5:41
14.	"Take Off/Crash"	7:20
15.	"Finale"	3:02
16.	"M.I.B. Closing Theme"	2:36
