= Just Cruisin' =

1997 single by Will Smith

Single by Will Smith

from the album Big Willie Style (UK edition only) and Men in Black: The Album
- B-side: "Men in Black"
- Released: November 25, 1997
- Length: 4:00
- Label: Columbia
- Songwriters: Will Smith, Nasir Jones, Kenneth Stover
- Producer: Poke & Tone

Will Smith singles chronology
"Men in Black" (1997)	"Just Cruisin'" (1997)	"Gettin' Jiggy wit It" (1998)

"Just Cruisin'" is a song by American rapper and actor Will Smith. It features on Men in Black: The Album and the UK release of his debut studio album, Big Willie Style (1997). Released on November 25, 1997, in Europe only, the song reached the top 40 in several countries, including Norway and Sweden, where the single peaked within the top 20. In New Zealand, the song was issued as a double A-side with "Gettin' Jiggy wit It" and peaked at number six.

== Background ==
"Just Cruisin'" first appeared on the soundtrack Men in Black: The Album and was also available on the UK release on Big Willie Style. The song was written by Will Smith and Nas, while production was handled by The Trackmasters, then known as Poke & Tone; the vocals are performed by actress Tichina Arnold.

== Commercial performance ==
"Just Cruisin'" found moderate international success, reaching the top 20 in Norway and Sweden and peaking at number 23 on the UK Singles Chart.

== Critical reception ==
British magazine Music Week rated the song four out of five, noting that it "profiles Smith at his laid-back best."

== Music video ==
An accompanying music video directed by Robert Caruso was released and got some playing time on the likes of MTV and BET. The video features Smith driving around Los Angeles and New York City in his car. The car can transform into a boat or a fighter jet and can also clean itself at the touch of a button.

== Track listings ==
- UK CD1
1. "Just Cruisin'" (original version) – 4:00
2. "Just Cruisin'" (Trackmasters Remix) – 4:11
3. "Just Cruisin'" (instrumental) – 3:59
4. "Big Willie Style" (Snippets) – 2:36
- UK CD2
1. "Just Cruisin'" (original version) – 4:00
2. "Big Willie Style" (album version) – 3:48
3. "It's All Good" (album version) – 4:11

== Charts ==
=== Weekly charts ===
Chart (1997–1998)	Peak position
Austria (Ö3 Austria Top 40)	37
Belgium (Ultratip Bubbling Under Flanders)	5
Belgium (Ultratop 50 Wallonia)	32
Europe (Eurochart Hot 100)	26
France (SNEP)	24
Germany (GfK)	27
Netherlands (Dutch Top 40)	33
Netherlands (Single Top 100)	45
New Zealand (Recorded Music NZ) with "Gettin' Jiggy wit It"	6
Norway (VG-lista)	13
Scottish Singles Sales (Official Charts)	46
Sweden (Sverigetopplistan)	7
Switzerland (Schweizer Hitparade)	32
UK Singles (Official Charts)	23
UK Hip Hop/R&B (Official Charts)	6

=== Year-end charts ===
Chart (1997)	Position
Sweden (Topplistan)	61

Chart (1998)	Position
New Zealand (RIANZ)	17

== Release history ==
Region	Date	Format(s)	Label(s)	Ref.
Europe	November 25, 1997	CD	Columbia	
United Kingdom	December 1, 1997	CD; cassette	Columbia	
