= Just the Two of Us (Will Smith song) =

1998 single by Will Smith

Single by Will Smith

from the album Big Willie Style
- Released: July 20, 1998
- Length: 5:15 (album version); 4:19 (radio edit)
- Label: Columbia
- Songwriters: Will Smith; Grover Washington, Jr.; Bill Withers; Ralph MacDonald; William Salter
- Producer: Sauce

Will Smith singles chronology
"Gettin' Jiggy wit It" (1998)	"Just the Two of Us" (1998)	"Miami" (1998)

"Just the Two of Us" is a song by American rapper & actor Will Smith. It was released as the fourth single from his debut solo studio album, Big Willie Style (1997), on July 20, 1998. The song was inspired by Bill Withers' and Grover Washington, Jr.'s love song of the same title; Smith's version samples and incorporates lyrics from the original. Instead of love between a couple, "Just the Two of Us" focuses on the relationship between a father and son. The song features Fuzzy and Sauce from the R&B group Somethin' for the People with Fuzzy providing the chorus and ad-libs, while Sauce is a credited as a producer on the track.

The song reached number 20 on the US Billboard Hot 100. It was also a top-five hit in the UK, reaching number two, and entered the top 20 in Iceland, Ireland, and New Zealand. The accompanying music video features Smith playing with his son, Trey, as well as numerous clips of several other famous men with their children. The song was parodied by Dr. Evil in the 1999 film Austin Powers: The Spy Who Shagged Me.

== Music video ==
The music video, directed by Bob Giraldi, begins with Smith playing with his son, Trey. Before the song starts, Trey says, "Now, dad, this is a very sensitive subject." The remainder of the video features clips of fathers with their children, including Smith playing with Trey, and other celebrity fathers, including Babyface, Montell Jordan, James Lassiter, Keenen Wayans, Brian McKnight, Magic Johnson, and Muhammad Ali (whom Smith later played in the 2001 biopic Ali). The video also features Smith's wife Jada Pinkett Smith pregnant with the couple's first child Jaden; and includes Will's father, younger brother, and two sisters.

== Track listings ==
US CD, 12-inch, and cassette single

1. "Just the Two of Us" (radio edit) – 4:19
2. "Just the Two of Us" (Rodney Jerkins remix featuring Brian McKnight) – 4:14
3. "Just the Two of Us" (Spanish version featuring DLG) – 4:10
4. "Just the Two of Us" (Korean version featuring Turbo) – 5:12
5. "Just the Two of Us" (instrumental) – 5:15

UK CD1

1. "Just the Two of Us" (radio edit) – 4:19
2. "Just the Two of Us" (Love to Infinity's classic club mix) – 7:16
3. "Just the Two of Us" (Love to Infinity's giant club mix) – 6:46

UK CD2

1. "Just the Two of Us" (album version) – 5:15
2. "Just the Two of Us" (Love to Infinity's classic radio mix) – 4:01
3. "Just the Two of Us" (Love to Infinity's extended R&B mix) – 4:45

UK cassette single and European CD1

1. "Just the Two of Us" (radio edit) – 4:19
2. "Just the Two of Us" (Love to Infinity's classic radio mix) – 4:01

European CD2

1. "Just the Two of Us" (radio edit) – 4:19
2. "Just the Two of Us" (Love to Infinity's classic radio mix) – 4:05
3. "Just the Two of Us" (Love to Infinity's classic club mix) – 7:15
4. "Just the Two of Us" (Love to Infinity's extended R&B mix) – 4:44

Australian CD single

1. "Just the Two of Us" (radio edit)
2. "Just the Two of Us"
3. "Just the Two of Us" (instrumental)
4. "Gettin' Jiggy wit It"

== Charts ==
=== Weekly charts ===
Chart (1998)	Peak position
Australia (ARIA)	27
Belgium (Ultratip Bubbling Under Flanders)	2
Belgium (Ultratop 50 Wallonia)	40
Canada Top Singles (RPM)	23
Europe (Eurochart Hot 100)	19
Germany (GfK)	87
Iceland (Íslenski Listinn Topp 40)	4
Ireland (IRMA)	14
Netherlands (Dutch Top 40)	35
Netherlands (Single Top 100)	46
New Zealand (Recorded Music NZ)	6
Scottish Singles Sales (Official Charts)	10
Sweden (Sverigetopplistan)	53
UK Singles (Official Charts)	2
UK Hip Hop/R&B (Official Charts)	1
US Billboard Hot 100	20
US Hot R&B/Hip-Hop Songs (Billboard)	17
US Hot Rap Songs (Billboard)	1
US Pop Airplay (Billboard)	6
US Rhythmic Airplay (Billboard)	2

=== Year-end charts ===
Chart (1998)	Position
Australia (ARIA)	97
Canada Top Singles (RPM)	61
Iceland (Íslenski Listinn Topp 40)	27
New Zealand (RIANZ)	46
UK Singles (OCC)	74
US Hot Rap Singles (Billboard)	49
US Mainstream Top 40 (Billboard)	28
US Rhythmic Top 40 (Billboard)	12

== Certifications ==
Region	Certification	Certified units/sales
New Zealand (RMNZ)	Gold	5,000^{*}
United Kingdom (BPI)	Silver	200,000^{^}
^{*} Sales figures based on certification alone.^{^} Shipments figures based on certification alone.

== Release history ==
Region	Date	Format(s)	Label(s)	Ref.
United States	May 4, 1998	Urban radio	Columbia	
United States	May 26, 1998	Rhythmic contemporary; contemporary hit radio	Columbia	
United Kingdom	July 20, 1998	CD; cassette	Columbia	
United States	September 22, 1998	12-inch vinyl; CD; cassette	Columbia	
