= Gettin' Jiggy wit It =

1998 single by Will Smith

Single by Will Smith

from the album Big Willie Style
- B-side: "Big Willie Style"
- Released: January 26, 1998
- Genre: Hip-hop
- Length: 3:48
- Label: Columbia
- Songwriters: Will Smith; Samuel Barnes; Bernard Edwards; Joe Robinson; Nile Rodgers
- Producer: Poke & Tone

Will Smith singles chronology
"Just Cruisin'" (1997)	"Gettin' Jiggy wit It" (1998)	"Just the Two of Us" (1998)

Music video
- "Gettin' Jiggy wit It" on YouTube

"Gettin' Jiggy wit It" is a song by American rapper and actor Will Smith, released as the third single from his debut solo album, Big Willie Style (1997). The verse is based around a sample of "He's the Greatest Dancer" by Sister Sledge, and the chorus is sampled from "Sang and Dance" by the Bar-Kays. Released in early 1998, the song was Smith's second hit produced by Poke & Tone and L.E.S., who replaced his long-time partner Jazzy Jeff, though the record-scratching techniques of Jazzy Jeff can be heard in the song.

The song spent three weeks at the top of the Billboard Hot 100 chart from March 14, 1998. It also won the Grammy Award in 1999 for the Best Rap Solo Performance. It was ranked the 68th greatest song of the 1990s by VH1. However, it was ranked at number 19 on the list of AOL Radio's 100 Worst Songs Ever in 2010. The song was included in Pitchfork Media's 2010 list of "The Seven Worst U.S. No. 1 Singles of the 90s".

== Composition ==
The song samples the 1979 Sister Sledge song "He's the Greatest Dancer". The "mama-uh, mama-uh, mama come closer" line is a reference to the song "Soul Makossa" by Manu Dibango, specifically the version adapted by Michael Jackson in "Wanna Be Startin' Somethin'"'s final bridge. The connotations associated with the expression getting jiggy were heavily influenced by this single. The term was originally a description of sexy fashion or style, but expanded to include dancing skill.

Smith has attested in an interview that his inspiration to alter the meaning for the purpose of the song came from his association of the term "jiggy" with "jigaboo", a derogatory term for African-Americans, which made the literal meaning of the title "getting African-American with it" and which was meant to reference the popular folk-myth of an innate sense of rhythm in black folks. The co-opting of a once offensive word also was racially empowering.

Nas ghost-writing "Gettin' Jiggy wit It" was a popular rumor in the 1990s, as the song's producers The Trackmasters had recently signed Nas to their label Trackmasters Entertainment. Nas later confirmed he was in the studio with Smith during the track's development and even suggested lines for the song; however, he insists that Smith wrote the entirety of the finished lyrics on his own. The Trackmasters corroborated Nas on Smith ultimately writing the lyrics on his own. Despite this confirmation, other music executives, including Steve Stoute, (Note: Stoute was the manager of both Nas and The Trackmasters, and was instrumental in launching Will Smith's music career as president of Urban Music for Sony Music Entertainment.) have maintained that Nas did indeed write the entirety of the lyrics..

== Critical reception ==
Larry Flick from Billboard wrote, "This intriguingly titled single is a sweet cross between rap and dance styles—perhaps even outrageous R&B? Despite his success in Hollywood, Smith keeps music close to his heart. He delivers a happy rap song—very upbeat, indeed. A background mixture of children's voices gives this single an interesting twist, which provides pleasant interference. The vivacious bass sound makes "Gettin' Jiggy Wit It" stand up on its feet. Even though it is repetitive, it's really a great one for those rap lovers out there. Get listening!" Pan-European magazine Music & Media said, "Musician-cum-actor Smith seems to have an infallible knack for simply irresistible poppy R&B. This time around, Sister Sledge's much-loved 1979 disco smash 'He's The Greatest Dancer' serves as the foundation for his third surefire hit in a row." Alan Jones from Music Week felt that "after the disappointing chart foray of his current single, Will Smith returns in double Quicktime with Gettin' Jiggy Wit It, a more lively rap laced with samples from three prior hits (...) which provides the melody, rhythm and class for a fine effort that will instantly restore Smith to the Top 20."

== Music video ==
The accompanying music video for the song was directed by American director Hype Williams and was filmed at various hotels on the Las Vegas Strip, including the New York-New York Hotel and Casino, The Mirage, and the foyer of the Luxor Las Vegas.

The video features a series of dance tableaux including a Deee-Lite-inspired sequence, a glitzy Puffa jacket-style choreographed studio dance routine, a sequence set in Ancient Egypt and a volcano-backed Hawaiian/ Māori segment. Other music styles, including Bollywood, are referenced. The video closes with Smith dancing beneath the Statue of Liberty replica at the New York-New York Hotel and Casino.

"Gettin' Jiggy wit It" won the 1998 MTV Video Music Award for Best Rap Video. The song was also nominated for four additional awards, including Best Choreography, Viewer's Choice, Best Dance Video, and Video of the Year, but these further nominations were lost to Madonna for her song "Ray of Light".

== Track listing ==
- US CD and cassette single
1. "Gettin' Jiggy wit It" – 3:50
2. "Men in Black" (DJ Scratch remix) – 3:45
- US 7-inch single
1. "Gettin' Jiggy wit It" – 3:50
2. "Men in Black" – 3:48
- UK CD1
1. "Gettin' Jiggy wit It" (album version) – 3:46
2. "Men in Black" (new video mix) – 3:41
3. Big Willie Style snippets – 2:56
- UK CD2
1. "Gettin' Jiggy wit It" (album version) – 3:46
2. "Gettin' Jiggy wit It" (Jay Scratch mix) – 3:41
3. "Big Willie Style" (album version) – 3:35
- UK cassette single
1. "Gettin' Jiggy wit It" (album version) – 3:46
2. "Men in Black" (new video mix) – 3:41
- European CD single
1. "Gettin' Jiggy wit It" (album version)
2. "Gettin' Jiggy wit It" (DJ Scratch remix)
- Australian CD single
1. "Gettin' Jiggy wit It"
2. "Just Cruisin'" (radio edit)
3. "Just Cruisin'" (instrumental)
4. Snippets from Big Willie Style
5. "Men in Black" (MIB alternate mix)

== Charts ==
=== Weekly charts ===
Chart (1998)	Peak position
Australia (ARIA)	6
Austria (Ö3 Austria Top 40)	26
Belgium (Ultratop 50 Flanders)	10
Belgium (Ultratop 50 Wallonia)	12
Canada Top Singles (RPM)	23
Canada Dance (RPM)	1
Canada Urban (RPM)	3
Europe (Eurochart Hot 100)	10
Finland (Suomen virallinen lista)	9
France (SNEP)	15
Germany (GfK)	18
Greece (IFPI)	9
Hungary (Mahasz)	4
Ireland (IRMA)	8
Italy (Musica e dischi)	6
Italy Airplay (Music & Media)	4
Netherlands (Dutch Top 40)	6
Netherlands (Single Top 100)	7
New Zealand (Recorded Music NZ)	6
Norway (VG-lista)	5
Scottish Singles Sales (Official Charts)	11
Sweden (Sverigetopplistan)	4
Switzerland (Schweizer Hitparade)	12
UK Singles (Official Charts)	3
UK Hip Hop/R&B (Official Charts)	2
US Billboard Hot 100	1
US Hot Latin Songs (Billboard)	37
US Hot R&B/Hip-Hop Songs (Billboard)	6
US Hot Rap Songs (Billboard)	1
US Pop Airplay (Billboard)	5
US Rhythmic Airplay (Billboard)	5

=== Year-end charts ===
Chart (1998)	Position
Australia (ARIA)	52
Belgium (Ultratop 50 Flanders)	83
Belgium (Ultratop 50 Wallonia)	64
Canada Dance (RPM)	19
Canada Urban (RPM)	38
Europe (Eurochart Hot 100)	38
France (SNEP)	71
Netherlands (Dutch Top 40)	46
Netherlands (Single Top 100)	65
New Zealand (RIANZ)	17
Sweden (Hitlistan)	37
UK Singles (OCC)	58
UK Urban (Music Week)	26
US Billboard Hot 100	14
US Hot R&B Singles (Billboard)	72
US Hot Rap Singles (Billboard)	17
US Mainstream Top 40 (Billboard)	21
US Rhythmic Top 40 (Billboard)	10

== Certifications ==
Region	Certification	Certified units/sales
Australia (ARIA)	Platinum	70,000^{^}
Belgium (BRMA)	Gold	25,000^{*}
Denmark (IFPI Danmark)	Gold	45,000^{‡}
France (SNEP)	Gold	250,000^{*}
New Zealand (RMNZ)	2× Platinum	60,000^{‡}
Sweden (GLF)	Gold	15,000^{^}
United Kingdom (BPI)	Platinum	600,000^{‡}
United States (RIAA)	Gold	900,000
^{*} Sales figures based on certification alone.^{^} Shipments figures based on certification alone.^{‡} Sales+streaming figures based on certification alone.

== Release history ==
Region	Date	Format(s)	Label(s)	Ref.
Australia	1997	CD	Columbia	
United States	November 18, 1997	Rhythmic contemporary; contemporary hit radio	Columbia	
United Kingdom	January 26, 1998	CD; cassette	Columbia	
United States	February 10, 1998	7-inch vinyl; CD; cassette	Columbia	
