= Men in Black (song) =

1997 single by Will Smith

Single by Will Smith

from the album Men in Black: The Album and Big Willie Style
- B-side: "M.I.B. Main Theme"; "Dah Dee Dah (Sexy Thing)" (by Alicia Keys)
- Released: June 3, 1997
- Length: 3:48
- Label: Columbia
- Songwriters: Will Smith; Patrice Rushen; Terri McFadden; Freddie Washington
- Producer: Poke and Tone

Will Smith singles chronology
"Men in Black" (1997)	"Just Cruisin'" (1997)

Men in Black singles chronology
"Men in Black" (1997)	"Black Suits Comin' (Nod Ya Head)" (2002)

Music video
- "Men In Black" on YouTube

"Men in Black" is a song by American rapper and actor Will Smith from the 1997 film of the same name, in which he also played the lead role. The song was released by Columbia Records on June 3, 1997, as the lead single from both the soundtrack and Smith's first solo album, Big Willie Style (1997), and it was Smith's debut solo single following his work with DJ Jazzy Jeff. The accompanying music video was directed by Robert Caruso, featuring Smith dancing with an alien.

The song is heard during the film's closing credits, and heavily samples "Forget Me Nots" by Patrice Rushen. Lyrically, Smith discusses the role, function, and duties of the Men in Black as the character Agent J, while Coko of the R&B group SWV provides the chorus and background vocals. "Men in Black" reached number one in several countries and won Smith a Grammy Award in 1998 for Best Rap Solo Performance.

== Background ==
"Men in Black" was produced by production duo Poke and Tone, consisting of Samuel Barnes and Jean-Claude Olivier, for the soundtrack to the 1997 film of the same name. According to the duo, the collaboration originated after Steve Stoute and Tommy Mottola approached them about working with Will Smith, who was transitioning from his earlier rap career into major film roles. The producers were initially reluctant, questioning Smith's musical relevance at the time. However, after a direct phone conversation and in-person meeting, their perspective shifted, ultimately forming a close working relationship with him that would continue with his solo debut, Big Willie Style (1997).

Barnes and Olivier based "Men in Black" on a sample of, and a re-sung chorus from "Forget Me Nots" (1982) by American singer and jazz pianist Patrice Rushen, with background vocals by Coko from the R&B trio SWV prominently featured during the chorus. Barnes later reflected that, although they were aware of the commercial purpose of the soundtrack single and the substantial budget allocated for its production, they did not fully comprehend the film's concept or the song's lyrics, which directly reference elements of the movie, until they had the opportunity to watch it in full.

== Release ==
Aside from appearing on the movie's soundtrack, "Men in Black" also appears on Smith's Columbia Records album Big Willie Style. "Men in Black" topped the charts in Australia, Belgium, France, Germany, Hungary, Ireland, New Zealand, Switzerland, and the United Kingdom. In Australia, Ireland, and the United Kingdom, "Men in Black" became Smith's second chart-topping song after "Boom! Shake the Room" in 1993, Smith's first solo chart-topping song, and Smith's first chart-topping song released under his real name. "Men in Black" did not chart on the Billboard Hot 100 because it was not released as a commercial single in the United States; at the time, only songs that were commercially released as singles were eligible, but it did top the airplay chart. The music video for the song also appears on the DVD The Will Smith Collection. It was also included in the album All Time Greatest Movie Songs, released by Sony in 1999. It was also featured after the end credits of the VHS release of "Men in Black". It was also covered by Forever the Sickest Kids for the compilation album Punk Goes Crunk & by Alvin and the Chipmunks for the album The A-Files: Alien Songs. An instrumental and short version of the song plays over the closing credits in Men in Black: The Series.

== Critical reception ==
Larry Flick from Billboard magazine wrote, "Remember when Will Smith was better known as a rapper? That seems like a lifetime ago, doesn't it? Well, he returns to music in excellent form on this lighthearted theme song from the soundtrack to his new movie of the same name. Smith has never been a hardcore lyricist, but he also never been anything less than clever, charming, and shrewdly aware of what the masses will dig. There's no doubt that this jam, which nicks its hook from Patrice Rushen's 'Forget Me Nots', will be an outta-da-box smasheroo." In 2017, Billboard ranked "Men in Black" number 100 in their list of "The 100 Greatest Pop Songs of 1997". Pan-European magazine Music & Media said that Smith builds his raps on the song by Rushen "in an instantly appealing way." A reviewer from Music Week gave it three out of five, noting that "Smith raps some rather stodgy sci-fi stuff over Patrice Rushen's 'Forget Me Nots' riff. It will be huge, like the film. And the video is a hoot." Kirstin Watson from Smash Hits gave "Men in Black" a top score of five out of five, saying it "is so cool it'll have you reaching for your black shades pronto. The video features weird alien things dancing along in the chorus line and the former Fresh Prince looking as hot as ever. It's totally rap-tastic and a surefire top three hit!"

== Music video ==
Robert Caruso directed the music video for the song. It starts with a dark hallway lighting up. Tommy Lee Jones enters from around the corner and begins to explain in a voiceover the purpose of the Men in Black. Will Smith enters with the line: "And we dress in black." There is then a cut to what appears to be an alleyway, a steel box which looks a bit like a commercial refrigerator in the middle. The surface begins to deform and show a glowing light from within. The video then cuts to several scenes of Agents experimenting on alien organisms and technology, with Smith rapping into further detail of the operations of the Men in Black. It soon has him surrounded by MIB agents in a warehouse. In the middle of the dance routine, an alien (Mikey from the film) comes in and screams at Smith. Smith then leads the agents and the alien to do a modified Electric Slide, where the alien slips out in the middle.

After dancing along with the agents, he goes after the alien. The same glowing light from the beginning of the video is then seen in the drivers seat of an SUV with the two female Agents who were with Smith in the vehicle; they speed off just as Smith reaches it. Disappointed, he puts on his sunglasses and takes out a Neuralyzer, pointing it at the camera.

Two versions of the video were made alternating the flash. In one version of the video, the flash takes the viewer back to the empty hallway from the opening scene, effectively erasing the video's contents entirely as if ensuring the viewer doesn't remember what they saw in the video, while in the other, the flash produces a white screen. Just before the flash in both, Smith says, somewhat regretfully, "Sorry".

== Track listings ==
=== Australia ===
- CD single
1. "Men in Black" – 3:48
2. "Men in Black" (Track Masters instrumental) – 3:48
3. "Men in Black" (Track Masters a cappella) – 3:29
4. "Some Cow Fonque (More Tea, Vicar?)" (by Buckshot LeFonque) – 5:10

=== Europe ===
- CD single
1. "Men in Black" (album version) – 3:48
2. "Men in Black" (MIB master mix) – 3:40
- Maxi-CD single
1. "Men in Black" (album version) – 3:48
2. "Men in Black" (MIB master mix) – 3:40
3. "Men in Black" (Track Masters instrumental) – 3:48
- This format was also released in South Africa.

=== UK ===
- CD1
1. "Men in Black" (album version)
2. "Men in Black" (instrumental)
3. "M.I.B. Main Theme"
4. "Men in Black" (the snippets)
- CD2
1. "Men in Black" (album version)
2. "Men in Black" (MIB master mix)
3. "Men in Black" (alternate mix)
4. "Dah Dee Dah (Sexy Thing)" (by Alicia Keys)

=== Japan ===
- Maxi-CD single
1. "Men in Black" (album version) – 3:48
2. "Men in Black" (Track Masters instrumental) – 3:48
3. "Men in Black" (Track Masters a cappella) – 3:29
4. "Men in Black" (MIB master mix) – 3:40

== Personnel ==
- Patrice Rushen, Terry McFadden, Will Smith – writers, composers
- Coko – backing vocals
- Matthew Wishart – clarinet, trombone
- Poke and Tone – drum programming, producer
- Commissioner Gordon, Tony Maserati – mixing
- John Shriver – recording
- Paul Griffin – animation director for "Mikey" (video)
- Rob Chiarelli – recording engineer & remixer

== Charts ==
=== Weekly charts ===
Chart (1997)	Peak position
Australia (ARIA)	1
Austria (Ö3 Austria Top 40)	2
Belgium (Ultratop 50 Flanders)	3
Belgium (Ultratop 50 Wallonia)	1
Canada Top Singles (RPM)	2
Canada Dance/Urban (RPM)	1
Denmark (IFPI)	2
Europe (Eurochart Hot 100)	1
Finland (Suomen virallinen lista)	2
France (SNEP)	1
Germany (GfK)	1
Hungary (Mahasz)	1
Iceland (Íslenski Listinn Topp 40)	2
Ireland (IRMA)	1
Israel (Israeli Singles Chart)	6
Italy (Musica e dischi)	4
Italy Airplay (Music & Media)	5
Netherlands (Dutch Top 40)	2
Netherlands (Single Top 100)	2
New Zealand (Recorded Music NZ)	1
Norway (VG-lista)	3
Poland Airplay (Music & Media)	6
Scottish Singles Sales (Official Charts)	1
Sweden (Sverigetopplistan)	2
Switzerland (Schweizer Hitparade)	1
UK Singles (Official Charts)	1
UK Hip Hop/R&B (Official Charts)	1
US Radio Songs (Billboard)	1
US Hot Latin Songs (Billboard)	39
US Pop Airplay (Billboard)	2
US R&B/Hip-Hop Airplay (Billboard)	9
US Rhythmic Airplay (Billboard)	1

=== Year-end charts ===
Chart (1997)	Position
Australia (ARIA)	6
Austria (Ö3 Austria Top 40)	12
Belgium (Ultratop 50 Flanders)	16
Belgium (Ultratop 50 Wallonia)	11
Brazil Airplay (Crowley)	7
Canada Top Singles (RPM)	23
Canada Dance/Urban (RPM)	12
Europe (Eurochart Hot 100)	5
France (SNEP)	7
Germany (Media Control)	4
Iceland (Íslenski Listinn Topp 40)	5
Netherlands (Dutch Top 40)	23
Netherlands (Single Top 100)	15
New Zealand (RIANZ)	5
Norway (VG-lista)	11
Romania (Romanian Top 100)	15
Sweden (Topplistan)	16
Switzerland (Schweizer Hitparade)	16
UK Singles (OCC)	6
US Hot 100 Airplay (Billboard)	22
US Hot R&B Airplay (Billboard)	60
US Rhythmic Top 40 (Billboard)	7
US Top 40/Mainstream (Billboard)	20

== Certifications ==
Region	Certification	Certified units/sales
Australia (ARIA)	2× Platinum	140,000^{^}
Austria (IFPI Austria)	Gold	25,000^{*}
Belgium (BRMA)	Platinum	50,000^{*}
France (SNEP)	Diamond	750,000^{*}
Germany (BVMI)	3× Gold	750,000^{^}
Netherlands (NVPI)	Gold	50,000^{^}
New Zealand (RMNZ)	Gold	15,000^{‡}
Norway (IFPI Norway)	Platinum	
Sweden (GLF)	Platinum	30,000^{^}
Switzerland (IFPI Switzerland)	Gold	25,000^{^}
United Kingdom (BPI)	2× Platinum	1,200,000^{‡}
^{*} Sales figures based on certification alone.^{^} Shipments figures based on certification alone.^{‡} Sales+streaming figures based on certification alone.

== Release history ==
Region	Date	Format(s)	Label(s)	Ref.
United States	June 3, 1997	Rhythmic contemporary; contemporary hit radio	Columbia	
United Kingdom	August 4, 1997	12-inch vinyl; CD; cassette	Columbia	
Japan	August 22, 1997	CD	Sony	
