= 50 Cent–Ja Rule feud =

Ongoing hip-hop feud

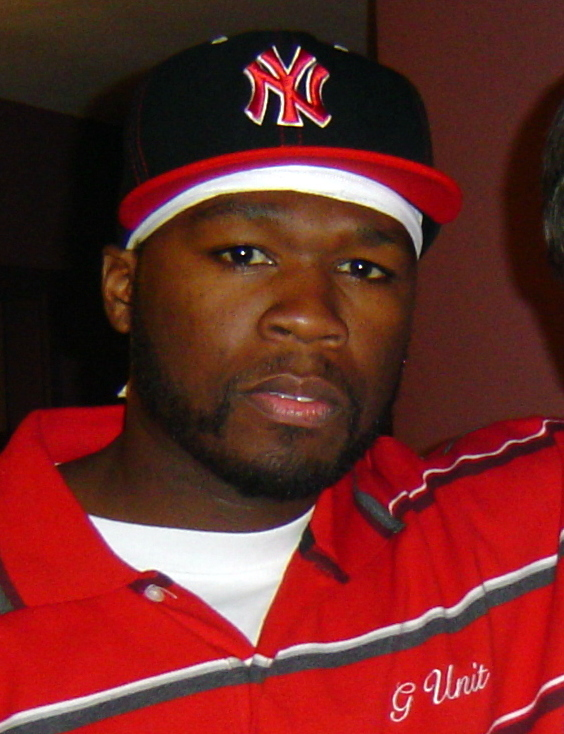
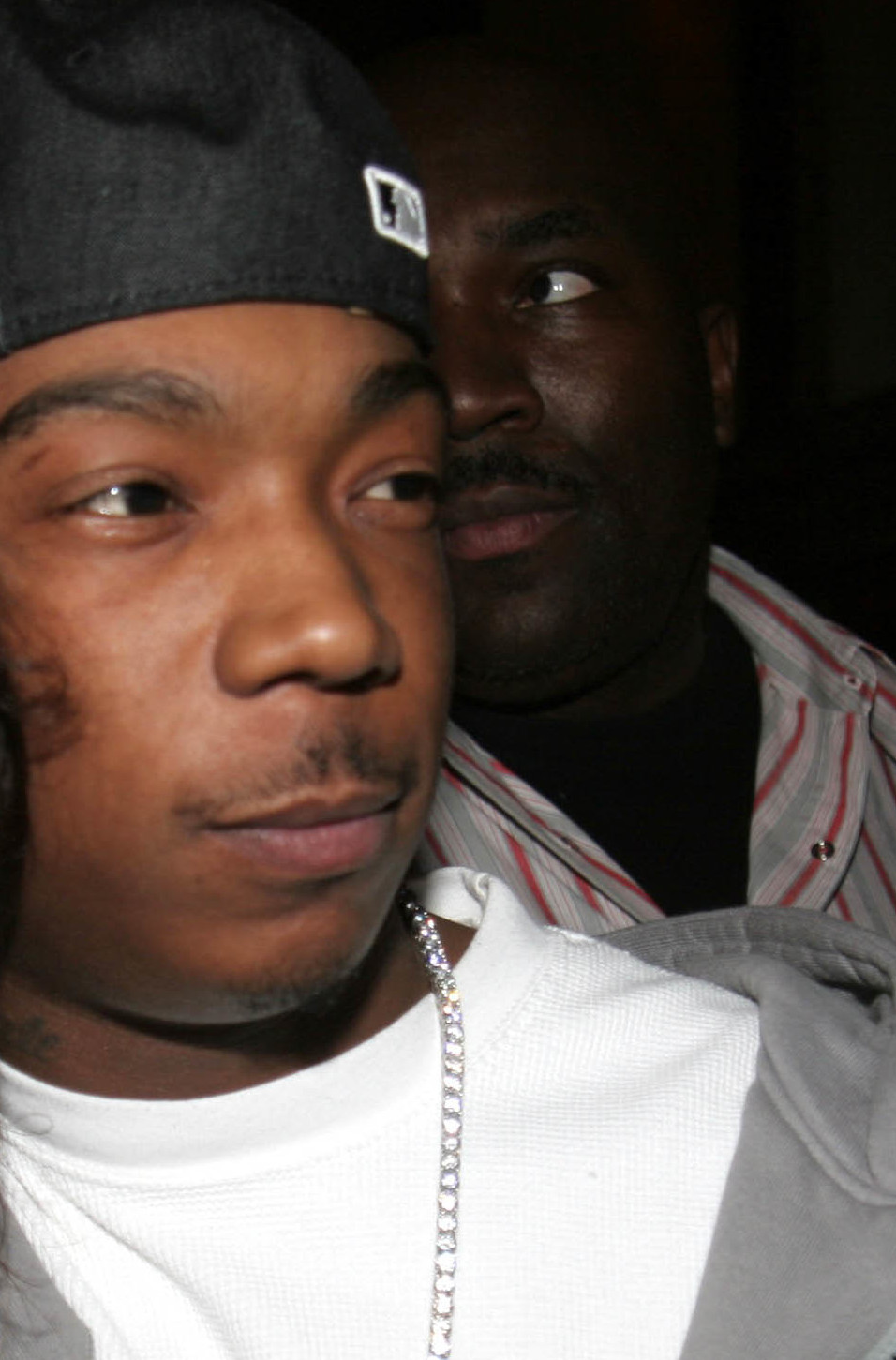
- 50 Cent in 2006 Ja Rule in 2005
- Date: 1999–present
- Medium: Diss tracks/altercations
- Status: Ongoing

Parties
50 Cent / Shady-Aftermath; Eminem (2003–present); The Game (2003–2006); Dr. Dre (2003–present); DMX (1999–2009); D12 (2003–present); G-Unit (1999–2022: Their disbandment); Obie Trice (2003–present); Busta Rhymes (2003–2009); Lloyd Banks (1999–2022); Tony Yayo (1999–present); Young Buck (2003-2008); Uncle Murda (2016–present); Kidd Kidd (2011–2018); XXL Magazine (2003–present)	Ja Rule / Murder Inc. Records; Benzino (2003–present); Fat Joe (2004–2012); Jay Z (2000–2003); Jadakiss (2004–2009); Royce da 5'9" (2002–2003); Black Child (1999–present); Cadillac Tah (1999–present); Irv Gotti (1997–2025: His Death); The Source Magazine (2003–2006)

Works
Life's on the Line; I Smell Pussy; Bump Heads; Wanksta; Back Down; Shit Hits The Fan; Doe Rae Me (Hailie's Revenge); Go To Sleep; Westside Story; Like Toy Soldiers; Piggy Bank	Blood In My Eye; The Real Wanksta; There's a Snitch in the Club; Loose Change; Clap Back; New York; Arch Nemesis; My Fofo; Checkmate

American rappers 50 Cent and Ja Rule have been involved in an extensive rap feud since 1999, stemming from an incident in which an associate of 50 Cent's allegedly robbed Ja Rule for his chain during a video shoot. The feud between the two New York rappers gained widespread coverage during the early 2000s, with numerous associates and fellow rappers drawing sides. The feud gained notoriety for its ongoing hostility and public incidents of violence at its peak.

== History ==
=== 1995–1999: Origins of the feud ===
Both 50 Cent (Curtis Jackson) and Ja Rule (Jeffrey Atkins) emerged during the late 1990s growing up in two separate neighborhoods in Queens; with 50 Cent originating from South Jamaica and Ja Rule being from Hollis. Both rappers also began as drug dealers, in an effort to maintain financial stability for a period of time. Ja Rule's career began in 1994, with him taking part in numerous projects and eventually resulting in him signing with Def Jam in late 1995 through his friendship with producer Irv Gotti. Meanwhile, 50 Cent developed a friendship with Jam Master Jay of Run DMC who sought to secure 50 a record deal in 1997. An early example of animosity starting between the two rappers likely began within that year; after Irv Gotti declined to offer 50 Cent a record deal with Def Jam, despite the insistence of Jam Master Jay.

Ja Rule emerged with his first solo album Venni Vetti Vecci in June 1999, with the single "Holla Holla" becoming a hit, propelling the record to reach platinum certification. During this time, 50 Cent developed a friendship with production duo Trackmasters at the behest of Jam Master Jay, which culminated in 50 signing a deal with Columbia Records later that same year. 50 Cent claims that the feud began in 1999 after Ja Rule spotted him with a man who robbed him of his jewelry and also because Ja Rule was "trying to be 2Pac". However, Ja Rule claimed the conflict stemmed from a video shoot in Queens because 50 Cent did not like Ja Rule "getting so much love" from the neighborhood. 50 Cent indirectly confirmed this in an interview with XXL Magazine, where 50 Cent states he was upset with Ja Rule for being under the aegis of Kenneth "Supreme" McGriff.

=== 2000–2002: The beginning of the rivalry ===
50 Cent's single "How to Rob" quickly became an underground hit throughout New York and 50 Cent soon began work on his major label debut Power of the Dollar, set for release in 2000. Despite 50 Cent's local success with "How To Rob", his local success paled in comparison to Ja Rule's following the release of Rule 3:36 later that same year. Tensions began to form beyond conflicts between the two crews and record labels. In February 2000, both 50 Cent and Ja Rule were scheduled to perform at the same Atlanta nightclub. Prior to the performances, music executive Chaz "Slim" Williams who was managing 50 Cent at the time, arranged a meeting between 50 Cent and Ja Rule to discuss ending their dispute. According to multiple accounts, the meeting escalated into a physical altercation after Ja Rule, who was holding a baseball bat, allegedly made threatening gestures toward 50 Cent. In response, 50 Cent reportedly attempted to strike Ja Rule, prompting a scuffle between the two. Accounts of the incident differ regarding what occurred next. 50 Cent has claimed to have punched Ja Rule, knocked him unconscious and took his chain while Ja Rule has maintained that he struck 50 Cent with the baseball bat before the two engaged in a physical struggle. Black Child, an associate of Ja Rule, later alleged that members of Ja Rule's entourage chased 50 Cent through a nearby hotel following the incident. However, Chaz Williams has disputed those accounts, stating that although the confrontation became physical, neither man was injured and both parties ultimately walked away without a scratch. Another incident took place at The Hit Factory a month later: As 50 Cent and members of G-Unit were recording upstairs, while Ja Rule and members of Murder Inc. were downstairs in another studio section. The two crews later discovered their proximity, and a fight later ensued. In the midst of the brawl, Murder Inc. affiliate Black Child stabbed several combatants, including 50 Cent. Despite being formally charged, Black Child claimed self-defense in the incident, and was later acquitted of any charges following the stabbing. Tensions continued to further escalate for 50 Cent following the studio brawl, as he had still maintained ties to numerous drug kingpins around Queens.

==== The shooting of 50 Cent ====
On May 24, 2000, Jackson was shot nine times outside his grandmother's house in connection with a failed robbery attempt. Jackson managed to survive the shooting, though he spent 13 days recovering in the hospital. Adding to existing tension, the attack was reportedly connected to Queens drug lord Kenneth McGriff, who was a known affiliate of Murder Inc. Records. The controversy stemmed from 50 Cent's song "Ghetto Qur'an (Forgive Me)" which had leaked in the spring of 2000. The lyrics directly attacked McGriff and his control over the drug trade in Queens during the 1980s, likely instigating into his own conflict with 50 Cent, culminating in the shooting. Following the attack, problems continued to arise for 50 Cent while he was still hospitalized. The wake of the shooting had cast a negative image for 50 Cent and G-Unit, Columbia Records ultimately chose to drop Jackson and several high-profile labels around New York reportedly blacklisted G-Unit due to the shooting." During this time, Ja Rule had obtained international success as his albums Rule 3:36 and Pain Is Love found widespread commercial success by the beginning of 2002.

=== 2003–2005: G-Unit, Shady, Aftermath vs. Murder Inc. ===
During most of 2002, 50 Cent would leak several mixtapes during his brief residence in Canada following his rejection by countless major labels across New York City. One of these mixtapes Guess Who's Back? had found its way to Eminem's attorney Paul Rosenberg. The single "Wanksta" was a subliminal diss aimed at Ja Rule, which ultimately managed to impress Eminem into including the song on the soundtrack to his film 8 Mile later that same year. The success of Wanksta, and Eminem's admiration for 50 Cent's output would culminate in him being signed to Shady/Aftermath for $1 million by both Eminem and Dr. Dre in late 2002. During this time; Murder Inc. Co-founder Irv Gotti further ignited tensions following the publicity around 50 Cent's record deal with Aftermath. Gotti alleged that Jackson had placed an order of police protection against various Murder Inc. affiliates in the wake of the brawl in March 2000. Public attention began to shift as it was discovered that the New York City Police Department had temporarily authorized a restraining order during Black Child's not guilty plea in due to his charges in connection with the stabbing incident. The verbal attack by Gotti and Ja Rule was widely believed to be a stunt to promote his upcoming album The Last Temptation, which was due for release in November 2002. 50 Cent would later capitalize on the incident; leaking the G-Unit diss track I Smell Pussy shortly afterwards. Murder Inc. found itself on unstable ground as their offices were raided by federal authorities on January 3, 2003, in connection with Kenneth McGriff. Thirteen days later; an unidentified gunman opened fire at the offices of Violator Management, no individuals were injured, but the attack was widely believed to be a retaliatory act attributed to the recent raid on Murder Inc.'s offices.

The roles in the feud began to shift rapidly as 50 Cent would go on to release his highly anticipated major label debut Get Rich or Die Tryin' on February 6, 2003. The album was established as both a critical and commercial juggernaut as it debuted at #1 on the Billboard 200 chart and became the highest selling record of 2003, while each of the album's singles sold several million copies apiece. One key track; Back Down became the most pivotal diss track in the feud up to that point, verbally dissecting both Ja Rule and Murder Inc's ability to maintain their flawed image as 50 Cent managed significantly greater commercial success in a far shorter span of time. The legal complications involving Murder Inc. ultimately delayed and reduced Ja Rule's response. Most of his initial responses involved remixing tracks released by 50 Cent, and re recording verses attacking him thereafter. DMX later took involvement with Eminem and Obie Trice as he had an ongoing feud with Ja Rule dating back to 1999 after his failed super group with Ja Rule and Jay Z. The three rappers attacked Ja Rule on the track Go to Sleep for the Cradle 2 the Grave soundtrack on February 18, 2003. The most controversial of these responses by Ja Rule was leaked in April 2003 in the track Loose Change; in which Ja Rule directly attacked Eminem and Dr. Dre for their affiliation with 50 Cent, notably aiming several insults at Eminem's daughter Hailie. On Eminem's 2005 track "Like Toy Soldiers" he mentioned how he had tried to coerce 50 Cent into ending his feud with Ja Rule, until Ja Rule leaked his diss track attacking him and his daughter. Eminem and D12 quickly responded with Hailie's revenge, a diss track that was critically lauded as one of the best in the genre for its aggression and ferocity. Further attacks came in the form of other rappers such as Obie Trice and Busta Rhymes, the latter of whom joined 50 Cent and Eminem on a remake of Tupac Shakur's "Hail Mary". In the track; Eminem proclaimed a narrative that drew criticism towards Ja Rule for his supposed influence of Tupac's image to benefit himself. In another move to damage Ja Rule's contributions to other collaborative efforts, Eminem later barred him from appearing on any remixed posthumous tracks by Tupac Shakur on the 2004 album Loyal to the Game. Former D12 affiliate Royce Da 5'9 who was involved with an ongoing feud with the group; took side with Murder Inc on his diss track Malcolm X in which he attacked both D12 and G-Unit, even threatening to sign with Murder Inc. Following the release of his track, Royce later made amends with Proof of D12 following the two being arrested in connection to a nightclub fight.

==== Sides are drawn ====
For the latter half of 2003; sides continued to be drawn in the feud as The Source magazine publicly showed support of Ja Rule's in the conflict. The magazine's co-owner at the time Raymond "Benzino" Scott took notice of the ongoing feud as he was involved in a separate public quarrel with Eminem, plausibly displaying his support for Ja Rule in a retaliatory act as Eminem had demonstrated full support for 50 Cent and G-Unit. The toll of the feud began to put itself on display for Ja Rule and Murder Inc by the latter half of 2003; the album Blood in My Eye was released on November 4, 2003, with a heavy emphasis on responding to the feud with both 50 Cent, G-Unit, and Eminem. Despite receiving mixed-to-positive reviews, Blood in My Eye failed to achieve a certification, selling a total of approximately 400,000 copies, indicative of the damage to Murder Inc's public image amidst the feud and their own legal issues with the federal government. Amidst the conflict, Ja Rule still had the support of various high-profile figures within the community, such as Fat Joe and Jadakiss who would go on to appear on Ja Rule's 2004 album R.U.L.E. in the form of the track New York. The album showed a slight return for Ja Rule commercially as it would outsell its predecessor and receive a gold certification, led by the success of New York as a single. The song continued to maintain tensions with 50 Cent and G-Unit as it was perceived to be a subliminal diss track against both 50 Cent and G-Unit member Lloyd Banks, mocking the latter's then-recent single "On Fire". In response to New York; 50 Cent took aim at both Fat Joe and Jadakiss for their collaboration with Ja Rule on the diss track "Piggy Bank" the following year with the release of his sophomore album The Massacre. Jadakiss responded with the track "Checkmate" six days later, While Fat Joe retaliated with the diss track "My Fofo" on his album All or Nothing three months later.

=== 2005–2013: Fading tensions ===
In the wake of both Fat Joe and Jadakiss being drawn into the feud, internal tensions began to affect 50 Cent's own relations within G-Unit. Despite The Game supporting G-Unit's ongoing feud with Murder Inc, his refusal to take part in separate feuds against Fat Joe or Jadakiss would quickly become a point of contention as he was later dismissed from G-Unit by 50 Cent during an on-air interview in March 2005; leading to a separate feud between both 50 Cent and The Game. Problems continued to arise for Murder Inc through 2005 as the label found itself at odds with Def Jam following their ongoing federal investigations in connection to Kenneth McGriff. The situation was made worse following a temporary acquisition by Universal Music in which Irv Gotti found himself unable to secure any further funding for the label shortly thereafter. Existing tensions between 50 Cent and Fat Joe boiled over during the 2005 MTV Video Music Awards when Fat Joe presented the award for best Hip Hop Video, in which he told the audience "I feel so safe tonight with all this police protection courtesy of G-Unit". 50 Cent later retaliated with a profanity-laden diatribe following his performance of the song "So Seductive" with fellow G-Unit artist Tony Yayo, exclaiming "Fat Joe's a pussy man! [...] Pussy Boy, Nigga What?!". The feud later affected Fat Joe financially as he sought to secure a $20 million contract endorsing Air Jordan sneakers in early 2005, Michael Jordan himself later cancelled the contract following the VMA incident as he was in fear of conflict with 50 Cent or any other affiliates. Following this, little action was taken between G-Unit or Terror Squad as Fat Joe later admitted to pressuring Irv Gotti to end the feud with G-Unit in 2011, though he was unsuccessful. Jadakiss would end his feud with 50 Cent and G-Unit in 2009 in which he performed together with G-Unit at 50 Cent's ThisIs50 Festival on October 3, 2009. Following his release from jail, DMX sought to make amends with Ja Rule via Irv Gotti, in which the two ended their feud at the 2009 VH1 Hip Hop honors.

In May 2011, Ja Rule publicly acknowledged his desire to end the feud, claiming "I'm cool. We ain't beefing no more. We'll never collaborate. That's just what it is. You don't have to be at war with somebody, but it's also kind of like U.S. and another country that they may not get along with. We don't gotta go to war, but we're not friends either. But we can coincide inside of a world. He's doing him, and he's not thinking about me, and I'm doing me and I'm not thinking about him." Following the 2012 death of music executive Chris Lighty a tribute concert was thrown in honor. Both 50 Cent and Fat Joe met prior to the performance and ended their feud out of respect for Lighty. The two rappers would later become business associates and friends following the performance. Following his 2011 announcement to end the feud, Ja Rule and Irv Gotti would further detail their internal conflicts during a 2013 interview with HOT 97's Angie Martinez. The two acknowledged their feud with 50 Cent had not only taken a toll on Ja Rule's prominence, but in connection to the federal indictment, damaged Murder, Inc., as a music label. In describing to Martinez their immediate reaction on hearing 50 Cent's single, "In Da Club", on the radio in 2003, describing it as "so dope" and indicating that they had a problem with its success. The two also disclosed that they had found themselves blackballed from various award shows and other events in which 50 Cent was to perform due to safety concerns. Notwithstanding seeing 50 Cent as a hustler, they showed respect at his entrepreneurial mentality, indicating their desires to end any further tensions at the time.

=== 2018–present: The feud reignites ===
The peace between the two rappers found itself to be short-lived as 50 Cent would reignite the feud in 2015 when Ja Rule gave a feedback to a social follower via Twitter over a similar feud between Meek Mill and Drake. Enraged, 50 Cent later responded with photos and comments via Instagram, only siding with Drake. The feud would fully resurface two years later when 50 Cent mocked Ja Rule's involvement in that year's ill-fated Fyre Festival in which numerous concertgoers were scammed in a poorly conceived event based on Ja Rule's business relationship with fraudster Billy McFarland. Jackson would further continue reigniting tensions on January 18, 2018; when he would once again attack Ja Rule on Big Boy's Neighborhood during an interview. Ja Rule immediately responded to 50 Cent's comments on twitter the very next day. Further adding to the hostility; Jackson would prank Ja Rule in October 2018 by purchasing 200 discounted front-row tickets for an upcoming show of his in Arlington, Texas for a total of US$3,000 via Groupon. Jackson later confirmed on social media that he bought the tickets with the express intention of forcing Ja Rule to perform in front of rows of empty seats. Tensions would briefly reignite between Eminem and Ja Rule as he would attack him on the track "The Ringer" from his 2018 album Kamikaze. During Eminem's followup response to Machine Gun Kelly's diss track "Rap Devil", he included several lines claiming to have taken part in ending the careers of both Ja Rule and Benzino on Killshot.

Eight years later, on February 11, 2026; an incident took place between Ja Rule and G-Unit affiliates Tony Yayo and Uncle Murda. The three were booked on a cross-country flight from San Francisco to New York; in which Ja Rule was seated directly in front of the two. After confronting him in his seat; a lengthy verbal altercation ensued in which Ja Rule was later removed from the flight after screaming expletives and throwing a pillow at Tony Yayo. Uncle Murda would later mock him on Instagram after they would steal his seat following his removal from the flight. Ja Rule would later express embarrassment at his reaction to the incident. In another response on February 26, 2026; Ja Rule would proclaim that he and 50 Cent could never be friends or end their hatred of one another, though he would also proclaim that neither side valued building a positive relationship, but the two could end hostilities despite his earlier statement.

== See also ==
- Drake–Kendrick Lamar feud
- East Coast–West Coast hip hop rivalry
- List of diss tracks
