= R. (R. Kelly album) =

1998 studio album by R. Kelly

Studio album by R. Kelly
- Released: November 10, 1998
- Recorded: 1996–98
- Genres: R&B; soul; hip-hop soul; gospel; pop
- Length: 129:40
- Label: Jive
- Producers: Barry Hankerson (exec.); R. Kelly; Trackmasters; Cory Rooney; Diddy; Ron Lawrence; Steven "Stevie J" Jordan; G-One; Al West; DeVante Swing

R. Kelly chronology
R. Kelly (1995)	R. (1998)	TP-2.com (2000)

Singles from R.
- 1. "Half on a Baby" Released: August 31, 1998; 2. "I'm Your Angel" Released: October 13, 1998; 3. "Home Alone" Released: October 19, 1998; 4. "When a Woman's Fed Up" Released: February 27, 1999; 5. "Did You Ever Think" Released: May 25, 1999; 6. "If I Could Turn Back the Hands of Time" Released: July 27, 1999; 7. "Only the Loot Can Make Me Happy" Released: May 23, 2000

"I Believe I Can Fly"
R. Kelly's "I Believe I Can Fly" from R.

Professional ratings
Review scores
Source	Rating
AllMusic	4/5 stars
Robert Christgau	(2-star Honorable Mention)
Entertainment Weekly	B−
Los Angeles Times	3/4 stars
Q	4/5 stars
Rolling Stone	4/5 stars
The Rolling Stone Album Guide	3.5/5 stars
Spin	(7/10)
Yahoo! Music	(mixed)
Yahoo! Music UK	8/10 stars

R. is the third solo album by American singer R. Kelly, released as a double album on November 10, 1998, by Jive Records. It marked the first time Kelly worked with other producers as opposed to producing the entire album himself. Its cover artwork uses the same image of Kelly from his 1993 debut 12 Play, only in silhouette form against a red and black background.

Upon its release, R. went to number one on the Top R&B/Hip-Hop Albums chart and number two on the US Billboard 200, selling over 216,000 copies in its first week of sales. It spawned Kelly's second number-one Billboard Hot 100 hit, "I'm Your Angel", as well as the number-one Top R&B hit "I Believe I Can Fly", which had been released two years earlier on the Space Jam soundtrack. R. is currently Kelly's best-selling release to date, having sold over eight million copies in the United States and over 12.4 million copies worldwide.

== Track listing ==
All songs written and produced by R. Kelly, except where noted.

=== Disc one ===
No.	Title	Writer(s)	Producer(s)	Length
1.	"Home Alone" (featuring Keith Murray)	Robert Kelly; Kelly Price; Keith Murray; G. Archie	G-One	5:00
2.	"Spendin' Money"	Kelly; Ron Lawrence; Sean Combs; Steven Jordan; Price; D. Romani; T. Willoughby	Sean Combs; Ron Lawrence; Stevie J	4:54
3.	"If I'm With You"		Trackmasters	4:32
4.	"Half on a Baby"		R. Kelly	4:56
5.	"When a Woman's Fed Up"	Kelly	Kelly	4:34
6.	"Get Up on a Room"	Kelly	Kelly	4:11
7.	"One Man"	Kelly	Kelly	4:57
8.	"We Ride" (featuring Cam'Ron, Noreaga, Vegas Cats, and Jay-Z)	Kelly; Cameron Giles; Victor Santiago; Shawn Carter; Vegas Cats; S. Barnes; J.C. Oliver; M.C. Rooney; Calvin Broadus; Andre Young; H. Casey; R. Finch	Kelly; Trackmasters	4:50
9.	"The Opera"	Kelly	Kelly	1:24
10.	"The Interview"	Kelly	Kelly	1:33
11.	"Only the Loot Can Make Me Happy" (featuring Tone of Poke & Tone)	Kelly; Barnes; Oliver	Kelly; Trackmasters	5:00
12.	"Don't Put Me Out"			5:22
13.	"Suicide"			5:20
14.	"Etcetera"			4:12
15.	"If I Could Turn Back the Hands of Time"	Kelly	Kelly	6:19
16.	"What I Feel/Issues"	Kelly	Kelly	4:45
17.	"I Believe I Can Fly" (international release)	Kelly	Kelly	5:20

=== Disc two ===
No.	Title	Writer(s)	Producer(s)	Length
1.	"The Chase"			2:46
2.	"V.I.P."	Kelly; Dalvin DeGrate; DeVante Swing	R. Kelly, DeVante Swing	4:17
3.	"Did You Ever Think" (featuring Tone)	Kelly; Curtis Mayfield; J.C. Oliver; S. Barnes	Kelly; Trackmasters	4:25
4.	"Dollar Bill" (featuring Foxy Brown)		Trackmasters	4:23
5.	"Reality"			4:44
6.	"2nd Kelly"			5:03
7.	"Ghetto Queen" (featuring Crucial Conflict)			4:20
8.	"Down Low Double Life"			5:00
9.	"Looking For Love"			4:37
10.	"Dancing with a Rich Man"			3:30
11.	"I'm Your Angel" (duet with Céline Dion)			5:32
12.	"Money Makes the World Go Round" (featuring Nas)	Kelly; Nasir Jones; A. Barnes; J. Malone	Trackmasters	4:10
13.	"I Believe I Can Fly (US release)/Gotham City (international release)"
14.	"Did You Ever Think" (Remix featuring Nas) (re-release)	Kelly; Jones; Mayfield; J.C. Olive; S. Barnes; Cory Rooney	Trackmasters	4:03
15.	"Gotham City" (re-release)	Kelly	Kelly	4:55

== Awards and nominations ==
BMI Awards – 1998 Pop Songwriter of the Year (won for "I Believe I Can Fly," "I Can't Sleep Baby (If I)," and "I Don't Want To by Toni Braxton)

Grammy Awards – 1999 Best Pop Collaboration With Vocals (nominated for "I'm Your Angel"), 2000 Best R&B Vocal Performance – Male (nominated for "When a Woman's Fed Up"), 2000 Best R&B Album (nominated)

Soul Train Music Awards – 1999 Best R&B/Soul Single, Male (nominated for "Half on a Baby"), 1999 Sammy Davis Jr. Entertainer of the Year Award (won), 1999 Best R&B/Soul Album, Male (won), 1999 Best R&B/Soul or Rap Album (won)

== Personnel ==
- R. Kelly – arranger, conductor, instruments, keyboards, mixer, producer, writer, main vocals, background vocals
- Keith Murray – vocals
- G-One – arranger, keyboards, mixer, producer, programming
- Chris Puram – mixer
- Kelly Price – background vocals
- Rob Bacon – guitar
- Marek – assistant mix engineer, assistant recording engineer
- Anthony Kilhoffer – assistant recording engineer
- Esther Nevarez – assistant recording engineer
- Dana Walsh – assistant recording engineer
- Sean "Puffy" Combs – producer
- Ron Lawrence – producer
- Stevie J. – co-producer
- Tony Maserati – mixer
- Jimmie Lee Patterson – assistant mix engineer
- Champ – assistant recording engineer
- Tone – co-producer, producer, background vocals, programming
- Poke – co-producer, producer, programming
- Stephen George – mixer, programming
- Greg Landfair – guitar
- Kendall D. Nesbitt – additional keyboards
- Antonio L. Daniels – additional keyboards
- Roy Hamilton – drum programming, vocoder programming
- Blake Chaffin – programming
- Brian Calicchia – assistant mix engineer
- Jeff Vereb – assistant mix engineer, assistant recording engineer
- LaFayette Carthon Jr. – additional keyboards, background vocals, conductor
- Paul J. Falcone – programming
- Jason Groucott – assistant mix engineer
- Brian Garten – assistant recording engineer, programming
- Sparkle – background vocals
- UB Tirado – assistant mix engineer
- Jeffrey Lane – assistant mix engineer, assistant recording engineer
- Stan Wood – assistant recording engineer
- Bryon Rickerson – assistant recording engineer
- Mark Johnson – assistant mix engineer
- Greg Thompson – assistant mix engineer
- Cory Rooney – co-producer, additional keyboards
- Kevin Crouse – mixer
- Chris Ribando – assistant recording engineer
- Cam'Ron – vocals
- Noreaga – vocals
- Shawn Carter – vocals
- Vegas Cats – vocals
- Joey Donnatello – mixer, programming
- Ron Lowe – assistant mix engineer
- Jason Goldstein – assistant recording engineer
- Paul Riser – arranger, conductor, orchestrator, strings
- Hart Holliman – arranger, conductor, orchestrator
- The Motown Romance Orchestra – arranging, strings and horns
- Keith Henderson – guitar
- Blackie – background vocals
- Rock – background vocals
- Chris Brickley – assistant recording engineer
- Tony Gonzalez – assistant recording engineer
- Bruce Kelly – background vocals
- Tony Black – additional engineering, digital editing
- Jason Bacher – assistant recording engineer
- Trey Fratt – assistant recording engineer
- Rick Behrens – assistant recording engineer
- Cynthia Jernigan – additional writing
- Nathan Dean – assistant mix engineer, assistant recording engineer
- Eric N. Yoder – programming
- Deatia Staples – background vocals
- Keisha Wallace – background vocals
- Lamont Smith – background vocals
- Shawn L. Lawson – background vocals
- Marjette J. Alston – background vocals
- Bryant M. Lee – background vocals
- Suzan Chatims – background vocals
- Denise Purkett – background vocals
- Reynonda McFarland – background vocals
- Monique Whittington – background vocals
- Opal Staples – background vocals
- Angela Clayton-Lawson – background vocals
- Foxy Brown – vocals
- Al West – co-producer, keyboards
- Rich Travali – mixer
- Chuck Bailey – assistant mix engineer
- Jon Heidelberger – assistant recording engineer
- Johnny Allen – assistant to the conductor
- J. Squillace – orchestra recording assistant
- Crucial Conflict – vocals
- Todd Parker – assistant mix engineer
- Ruth Varella – assistant recording engineer
- Edward Tucker – background vocals
- Russell Hinton – background vocals
- Michael McCoy – assistant mix engineer
- Humberto Gatica – mixer
- Rob Mathes – arranger, conductor
- Loris Holland – additional keyboards, background vocals, conductor, Hammond B-3 organ
- Steve Skinner – keyboards, drum programming
- Jeff Bova – additional keyboard programming
- Jimmy Bralower – drum programming
- Jeffrey Morrow – background vocals
- Yvonne Gage – background vocals
- Cheryl Wilson – background vocals
- Joan Walton – background vocals
- Robert Bowker – background vocals
- Johnny Rutledge – background vocals
- Robin Robinson – background vocals
- Rob Trow – background vocals
- Cathy Richardson – background vocals
- Anthony Ransom – background vocals
- Lisa Lougheed – background vocals
- Stevie Robinson – background vocals
- Tawatha Agee – background vocals
- Troy Bright – background vocals
- Dennis Collins – background vocals
- Ayana George – background vocals
- Diva Gray – background vocals
- Nancey Jackson – background vocals
- Latasha Jordon – background vocals
- Paulette McWilliams – background vocals
- Robert Moe – background vocals
- Fonzi Thornton – background vocals
- Spencer Washington – background vocals
- Elizabeth Withers – background vocals
- Don Hachey – assistant recording engineer
- Céline Dion – vocals, background vocals
- Bill Douglass – assistant recording engineer
- Jason Stasium – assistant recording engineer
- Chris Brooke – assistant recording engineer
- Brian Callicha – assistant recording engineer
- Jake Ninan – assistant recording engineer
- Nasir Jones – vocals
- "The Luv Club" Choir – background vocals
- Percy Bady – director, keyboards
- Tom Recchion – art direction and design
- Jackie Murphy – photo shoot/art coordination
- Reisig & Taylor – photography
- June Ambrose – stylist
- Mode Squad – stylist
- Robin Hannibal – groomer
- Aliesh Peirce – groomer
- TAR – original cover photo
- Kenneth Halsband – location manager
- Bruce Goldman – location manager
- Leon Adair – location manager
- Beata Rosenbaum – casting
- Michael Anthony – make-up
- Reginald Payton – car shots
- Howard Simmons – interior shots
- Barry Hankerson – executive producer
- 'Big Bass' Brian Gardner – mastered at Bernie Grundman Mastering, Hollywood, California

== Charts and certifications ==
=== Weekly charts ===
Chart (1998–2000)	Peak position
Australian Albums (ARIA)	65
Austrian Albums (Ö3 Austria)	45
Belgian Albums (Ultratop Flanders)	5
Belgian Albums (Ultratop Wallonia)	9
Canadian R&B Albums (Nielsen SoundScan)	5
Danish Albums (Hitlisten)	32
Dutch Albums (Album Top 100)	3
French Albums (SNEP)	17
German Albums (Offizielle Top 100)	8
Norwegian Albums (VG-lista)	27
Swedish Albums (Sverigetopplistan)	33
Swiss Albums (Schweizer Hitparade)	26
UK Albums (Official Charts)	27
US Billboard 200	2
US Top R&B/Hip-Hop Albums (Billboard)	1

=== Year-end charts ===
Chart (1998)	Position
Canadian Albums (RPM)	99
Dutch Albums (Album Top 100)	93
UK Albums (OCC)	95
US Top R&B/Hip-Hop Albums (Billboard)	90

Chart (1999)	Position
Belgian Albums (Ultratop Flanders)	61
Belgian Albums (Ultratop Wallonia)	96
Dutch Albums (Album Top 100)	35
UK Albums (OCC)	77
US Billboard 200	31
US Top R&B/Hip-Hop Albums (Billboard)	4

Chart (2000)	Position
Belgian Albums (Ultratop Flanders)	72
Belgian Albums (Ultratop Wallonia)	54

=== Certifications ===
Region	Certification	Certified units/sales
Belgium (BRMA)	Platinum	50,000^{*}
Canada (Music Canada)	Platinum	100,000^{^}
France (SNEP)	2× Gold	200,000^{*}
Germany (BVMI)	Gold	250,000^{^}
Netherlands (NVPI)	2× Platinum	200,000^{^}
Switzerland (IFPI Switzerland)	Gold	25,000^{^}
United Kingdom (BPI)	Platinum	347,173
United States (RIAA)	8× Platinum	8,000,000^{^}
Summaries
Europe (IFPI)	Platinum	1,000,000^{*}
^{*} Sales figures based on certification alone.^{^} Shipments figures based on certification alone.

== Samples ==
- "V.I.P." contains a sample of "Alone" composed by Donald and Dalvin DeGrate and performed by Jodeci from the album Diary of a Mad Band.
- "Spendin' Money" contains a sample of "A Lover's Holiday" composed by Davide Romani and Tanyayette Willoughby and performed by Change from the album The Glow of Love.

Songs sampled in future songs:

- "When a Woman's Fed Up"
  - "K-I-S-S-I-N-G" by Nas from the album I Am...
  - "Um Pouco Mais De Malandragem" by Facção Central from the album Família Facção (1999)
  - "America" by Trick Daddy featuring Society from the album Book of Thugs (2000)
  - "Runnin Out of Bud" by 8Ball & MJG featuring Killer Mike from the album Ridin High (2007)
  - "Thug Nigga" by Z-Ro from the album Heroin (2010)
  - "Broken Man" by Anthony Hamilton from the album Back to Love (2011)
  - "Thug and a Gee" by Prodeje from the album Hood 2 Da Good (2011)
  - "Smoke Break" by Lil B from the album "855" Song Based Freestyle Mixtape (2011)
  - "Smoke Break PT1 BASED FREESTYLE" by Lil B from the album "848" SONG BASED FREESTYLE MIXTAPE (2011)
  - "Neon Cathedral" by Macklemore and Ryan Lewis featuring Allen Stone from the album The Heist (2012)
- "Did You Ever Think"
  - "Streets Love Me" by Foxy Brown from the album Ill Na Na 2: The Fever
  - "The Quan" by Foxy Brown from the album Brooklyn's Don Diva
  - "How to Rob" by 50 Cent featuring The Madd Rapper from the album Power of the Dollar and In Too Deep (soundtrack)

== Covers ==
- Palestinian rap group DAM has covered "Did You Ever Think".

== See also ==
- List of number-one R&B albums of 1998 (U.S.)
