= Did You Ever Think =

Single by R. Kelly featuring Nas and Tone

from the album R.
- Released: May 25, 1999
- Genre: R&B; hip-hop; Latin
- Length: 4:32 (original); 4:03 (remix)
- Label: Jive
- Songwriters: Robert Kelly; Curtis Mayfield; Jean-Claude Olivier; Samuel Barnes
- Producers: R. Kelly; Poke & Tone

R. Kelly singles chronology
"When a Woman's Fed Up" (1999)	"Did You Ever Think" (1999)	"If I Could Turn Back the Hands of Time" (1999)

Nas singles chronology
"Hate Me Now" (1999)	"Did You Ever Think" (1999)	"It's Mine" (1999)

"Did You Ever Think" is a single by American musician R. Kelly, on his third solo studio album titled R. It was the seventh single on that album and charted at the top 40 on the Billboard Hot 100, at number 27. The remix features rapper Nas and a video has been made for the remix, but not the original. It charted at number eight on the R&B/Hip Hop chart and at number 20 on the UK Singles Chart.

== Background ==
"Did You Ever Think"was produced by production duo Poke and Tone, consisting of Samuel Barnes and Jean-Claude Olivier, for R. Kelly's third solo studio album titled R. (1998). The collaboration developed from the producers' prior touring experience with Kelly, which established a working relationship. According to Barnes, the project began after label executive Barry Weiss suggested they work together to create an uptempo track, an idea that both parties embraced and which ultimately led to the production of the song.

The recording process, according to Olivier, was lengthy and unpredictable. Kelly would frequently leave the studio for extended periods and then return unexpectedly. On one occasion, the producers were considering scrapping a nearly completed beat after several hours without seeing him. Just before abandoning the track, Kelly returned, sang over the beat, and declared it the record's "anthem." His enthusiasm energized the producers, prompting them to continue with the session. Kelly then worked in the booth to write the hook and record his vocals, cementing the final version of the song.

== Music video ==
The music video is directed by R. Kelly and Bille Woodruff. The video is for the remix and it features rapper Nas.

== Charts ==
=== Weekly charts ===
Chart (1999)	Peak position
Germany (GfK)	26
Netherlands (Dutch Top 40)	28
Netherlands (Single Top 100)	24
Scotland Singles (OCC)	54
Switzerland (Schweizer Hitparade)	98
UK Singles (OCC)	20
UK Dance (OCC)	16
UK Hip Hop/R&B (OCC)	4
UK Indie (OCC)	2
US Billboard Hot 100	27
US Hot R&B/Hip-Hop Songs (Billboard)	8
US Rhythmic Airplay (Billboard)	27

=== Year-end charts ===
Chart (1999)	Position
UK Urban (Music Week)	12
Netherlands (Dutch Top 40)	155
US Hot R&B/Hip-Hop Songs (Billboard)	34

== Later samples ==
- "How to Rob" by 50 Cent featuring The Madd Rapper from the album Power of the Dollar and In Too Deep (soundtrack)
- "Streets Love Me" by Foxy Brown from the album Ill Na Na 2: The Fever
- "The Quan" by Foxy Brown from the album Brooklyn's Don Diva
- "Perdono" by Tiziano Ferro from the album Rosso relativo

== Covers ==
- Palestinian rap group DAM covered "Did You Ever Think".
