= 50 Cent Is the Future =

Mixtape by G-Unit
- Released: June 1, 2002
- Recorded: 2001 in Canada
- Genres: Gangsta rap; hardcore hip-hop
- Length: 49:37
- Labels: Street Dance; Thurd World Muzic

50 Cent chronology
Guess Who's Back? (2002)	50 Cent Is the Future (2002)	No Mercy, No Fear (2002)

Professional ratings
Review scores
Source	Rating
RapReviews	7/10
Spin	3/5 stars
XXL	XL (4/5)

50 Cent Is the Future is the second mixtape by American rapper 50 Cent and first one by his rap group G-Unit. It was released on June 1, 2002, via Street Dance/Thurd World Muzic. The lone guest appearance is provided by UTP, which marks the first collaboration between the group and future member Young Buck.

In September 2004, the album was charted at number 59 in Switzerland and at number 65 in the United Kingdom. In 2006, the album was ranked at #7 on the 'Top Ten Mixtape List Of All Time' by XXL, and at #22 on 'The 50 Best Rap Mixtapes of the Millennium' by Pitchfork.

== Background ==
The mixtape was recorded in Canada in 2001 after 50 Cent was dropped from Columbia Records and blacklisted from the recording industry due to his controversial song "Ghetto Qu'ran (Forgive Me)", leaving his debut studio album Power of the Dollar unreleased. He then traveled to Canada to record the mixtape due to being unable to find a studio in the United States that would allow him to record. The project mostly revisits material by Mobb Deep and features Southern hip-hop group UTP represented by Skip, Young Buck and Juvenile. After 50 Cent Is the Future, he recorded his 2002 compilation mixtape Guess Who's Back?, which "G-Unit That's What's Up" is included in.

== Track listing ==
No.	Title	Writer(s)	Original song and artist(s)	Length
1.	"U Should Be Here"	G-Unit	"Be Here" by Raphael Saadiq and D'Angelo	3:33
2.	"Bump Dat Street Mix"	50 Cent and Tony Yayo	"Bump Dat" by Havoc	3:06
3.	"The Banks Workout"	Lloyd Banks and 50 Cent	"Lyrical Exercise" by Jay-Z	4:01
4.	"Whoo Kid Kay Slay Shit!"	50 Cent	"Crawlin'" by Mobb Deep	2:33
5.	"50 Cent Just Fucking Around"	50 Cent	"What You Want" by Ma$e and Total; "Biggie" by Junior M.A.F.I.A.	2:12
6.	"G-Unit Soldiers"	G-Unit	"Losin' Weight" by Cam'ron and Prodigy	3:06
7.	"Got Me a Bottle"	50 Cent and Lloyd Banks	"Got Me a Model" by R.L. and Erick Sermon	2:52
8.	"Tony Yayo Explosion"	50 Cent and Tony Yayo	"Eye for a Eye (Your Beef Is Mines)" by Mobb Deep, Nas and Raekwon	2:45
9.	"Clue/50"	50 Cent		1:30
10.	"A Lil Bit of Everything U.T.P."	G-Unit and UTP	"Little Bit" by Juvenile, 50 Cent, Lloyd Banks, Skip, Tony Yayo, Wacko, Young Buck	4:09
11.	"Cut Master C Shit""	50 Cent	"No Nuts, No Glory" by the Geto Boys	2:56
12.	"Call Me"	50 Cent and Tony Yayo	"Call Me" by Tweet	3:03
13.	"50/Banks"	50 Cent and Lloyd Banks	"They Ain't Ready" by Jadakiss, Bubba Sparxxx and Timbaland	2:45
14.	"Surrounded by Hoes"	50 Cent	"Round & Round" by Jonell	2:10
15.	"G-Unit That's What's Up!"	G-Unit	"Y'all Been Warned" by Wu-Tang Clan	4:13
16.	"Bad News"	G-Unit	"Feeling Good" by Nina Simone	4:33
Total length:				49:27

== Charts ==
Chart (2004)	Peak position
Swiss Albums (Schweizer Hitparade)	59
UK Albums (Official Charts)	65
