= Thug Love =

Thug Love may refer to:

- "Thug Love" (song) a song by 50 Cent
- "Thug Luv", a song by Bone Thugs-n-Harmony featuring 2pac
- "Thug Luv", a song by DJ Kayslay
- "Thug Luv", a song by Lil Kim Featuring Twista
