= No Mercy, No Fear =

Mixtape by G-Unit
- Released: August 1, 2002
- Recorded: 2001–2002
- Genres: East Coast hip hop; hardcore hip hop; gangsta rap
- Length: 50:30
- Label: BCD Music Group
- Producers: DJ Whoo Kid; Sha Money XL; DJ Clue

G-Unit chronology
50 Cent Is the Future (2002)	No Mercy, No Fear (2002)	God's Plan (2002)

Professional ratings
Review scores
Source	Rating
Spin	2/5 stars

No Mercy, No Fear is the second mixtape by hip hop group G-Unit, released on August 1, 2002. Originally released independently as a free mixtape, it was re-released in 2006 by BCD Music Group. No Mercy, No Fear was recorded after the group's de facto leader, 50 Cent, had signed a $1 million deal with Aftermath Entertainment and Shady Records following the release of his 2002 compilation album Guess Who's Back?. It featured the hit single "Wanksta", which was added onto the 8 Mile soundtrack album and later as a bonus track on his 2003 commercial debut album Get Rich or Die Tryin'. It also contained the freestyle to Puff Daddy's song "Victory", from the album No Way Out, which was later used on Bad Boy Records's compilation album Bad Boy's 10th Anniversary... The Hits.

Described by Billboard magazine as a classic, No Mercy, No Fear was released during 50 Cent's and G-Unit's 2002 mixtape run, in anticipation of his debut album. According to Billboard, the mixtapes caused "tremendous buzz amongst hip-hop fans and artists". Vancouver Sun wrote that the mixtapes "widely circulated" for several years after the release. By rapping over instrumentals from other artists and then releasing it for free, with No Mercy, No Fear and the other contemporary releases, 50 Cent revolutionized hip hop mixtapes, creating a blueprint for later artists, such as Lil Wayne, Young Jeezy, and Drake. The mixtape was ranked No. 5 on XXL's Top 20 Mixtapes list.

== Track listing ==
#	Title	Length	Performer(s)	Samples
1	"MTV Intro"	0:53	G-Unit	
2	"Green Lantern"	1:36	50 Cent	"'Till I Collapse" by Eminem (featuring Nate Dogg)
3	"Elementary"	3:37	G-Unit (featuring Scarlet)	
4	"Fat Bitch"	3:28	G-Unit	"Baby Phat" by De La Soul (featuring Devin the Dude and Yummy Bingham)
5	"Banks Victory"	3:29	Lloyd Banks and 50 Cent	"Victory" by Puff Daddy (featuring The Notorious B.I.G. and Busta Rhymes)
6	"Back Seat/Tony Yayo"	3:03	Tony Yayo and 50 Cent	"I Shot Ya" by LL Cool J (featuring Keith Murray)
7	"After My Chedda"	2:50	G-Unit	"Luv U Better" by LL Cool J (featuring Marc Dorsey)
8	"Soldier"	3:43	G-Unit	"Soldier" by Eminem
9	"E.M.S."	1:35	G-Unit	"The Blast" by Reflection Eternal
10	"G-Unit Skit"	0:42	Bang Em Smurf	
11	"Say What You Say"	4:03	G-Unit	"What Goes Around" by Nas
12	"Clue Shit"	2:50	50 Cent	"Sherm Stick" by Jayo Felony & "Ova Here" by KRS-One
13	"Funk Flex"	2:04	50 Cent	"Guess Who's Back" by Scarface (featuring Jay-Z and Beanie Sigel)
14	"Whoo Kid"	2:42	50 Cent	"Whoa!" by Black Rob
15	"Scarlet Skit"	1:20	G-Unit	
16	"Part 2 & Bump Heads"	3:41	G-Unit	"I Need a Girl (Part Two)" by P. Diddy (featuring Loon, Ginuwine and Mario Winans)/"Ambitionz az a Ridah" by 2Pac
17	"G-Unit/U.T.P."	3:41	50 Cent, Young Buck and Skip from UTP	"NY to NO" by Juvenile, 50 Cent, Young Buck, Skip
18	"Wanksta"	3:44	50 Cent	"Do What You Gotta Do" by Nina Simone
19	"Star & Buc Outro"	1:35	G-Unit	An excerpt from the Star & Buc radio show.
