= When a Woman's Fed Up =

- European CD single

Single by R. Kelly

from the album R.
- Released: February 27, 1999
- Recorded: 1998
- Genre: R&B
- Length: 4:39
- Label: Jive
- Songwriter: Robert Kelly
- Producer: R. Kelly

R. Kelly singles chronology
"Home Alone" (1998)	"When a Woman's Fed Up" (1999)	"Did You Ever Think" (1999)

"When a Woman's Fed Up" is an R&B song by American singer R. Kelly from his 1998 double album, R. The song reached number 22 on the Billboard Hot 100 and number 5 on the Hot R&B/Hip-Hop Singles chart. The video, directed by Kelly, features Kelly's protégée Sparkle as the woman who is fed up. The single and the video were released after Sparkle's debut single "Be Careful", a duet with R. Kelly, as a continuation of the story.

== Music video ==
The music video for "When a Woman's Fed Up" is directed by R. Kelly. The video was released after Sparkle's debut single "Be Careful" with Kelly and it is seen as a continued story to that video. This and "Be Careful" are two of Kelly's first solo-directed videos since "She's Got That Vibe" from Kelly's then-group Public Announcement in 1991, as he usually co-directs with others.

== Charts ==
=== Weekly charts ===
Chart (1999)	Peak position
Germany (GfK)	25
Netherlands (Single Top 100)	25
New Zealand (Recorded Music NZ)	14
US Billboard Hot 100	22
US Hot R&B/Hip-Hop Songs (Billboard)	5
US Rhythmic Airplay (Billboard)	8

=== Year-end charts ===
Chart (1999)	Position
Netherlands (Dutch Top 40)	148
US Billboard Hot 100)	83

== Legacy ==
=== Later samples ===
- "K-I-S-S-I-N-G" by Nas from the album I Am... (1999)
- "Um Pouco Mais De Malandragem" by Facção Central from the album Família Facção (1999)
- "America" by Trick Daddy feat. Society from the album Book of Thugs: Chapter AK Verse 47 (2000)
- "Runnin' Out of Bud" by 8Ball & MJG feat. Killer Mike from the album Ridin High (2007)
- "Thug Nigga" by Z-Ro from the album Heroin (2010)
- "Broken Man" by Anthony Hamilton from the album Back to Love (2011)
- "Thug and a Gee" by Prodeje from the album Hood 2 Da Good (2011)
- "Smoke Break" by Lil B from the album 855 Song Based Freestyle Mixtape (2011)
- "Smoke Break Pt1 Based Freestyle" by Lil B from the album 848 Song Based Freestyle Mixtape (2011)
- "Neon Cathedral" by Macklemore and Ryan Lewis feat. Allen Stone from the album The Heist (2012)

=== Later covers ===
- "Singing Melody" by Singing Melody from the album Total Togetherness Vol. 10 (1999)
