= If I Could Turn Back the Hands of Time =

1999 single by R. Kelly

Single by R. Kelly

from the album R.
- Released: July 27, 1999
- Length: 6:17 (album and single version); 4:56 (radio edit)
- Label: Jive
- Songwriter: Robert Kelly
- Producer: R. Kelly

R. Kelly singles chronology
"Did You Ever Think" (1999)	"If I Could Turn Back the Hands of Time" (1999)	"Satisfy You" (1999)

"If I Could Turn Back the Hands of Time" is a song by American singer R. Kelly, released as the fifth single from his third album, R. (1998). The song is a ballad about a man wishing he could go back in time and repair his relationship with his girlfriend. The song peaked at number 12 on the US Billboard Hot 100 and became a top-10 hit across Europe, peaking at number one in Belgium, the Netherlands, and Switzerland.

== Success and legacy ==
The song has sold 660,000 copies in the United Kingdom and is one of R. Kelly's biggest international hits, In Belgium, the song peaked at number one in both Flanders and Wallonia and is certified triple platinum for selling over 150,000 copies. The song was certified gold in the United States in October 2001.

The song has been covered by several musicians, including Ed Sheeran and talent show contestants. Rapper Mims sampled the song for his 2007 debut album Music Is My Savior on the track "I Did You Wrong".

== Live performances ==
Kelly did not perform this song very often. His first live performance was on the UK television show Top of the Pops.

== Charts and certifications ==
=== Weekly charts ===
Chart (1999)	Peak position
Australia (ARIA)	65
Austria (Ö3 Austria Top 40)	2
Belgium (Ultratop 50 Flanders)	1
Belgium (Ultratop 50 Wallonia)	1
Canada (Nielsen SoundScan)	7
Canada Adult Contemporary (RPM)	45
Czech Republic (IFPI)	15
Europe (Eurochart Hot 100)	1
France (SNEP)	2
Germany (GfK)	2
Ireland (IRMA)	2
Italy (FIMI)	20
Netherlands (Dutch Top 40)	1
Netherlands (Single Top 100)	1
New Zealand (Recorded Music NZ)	39
Norway (VG-lista)	9
Scottish Singles Sales (Official Charts)	4
Sweden (Sverigetopplistan)	3
Switzerland (Schweizer Hitparade)	1
UK Singles (Official Charts)	2
UK Indie (Official Charts)	1
UK Hip Hop/R&B (Official Charts)	1
US Billboard Hot 100	12
US Adult Contemporary (Billboard)	24
US Hot R&B/Hip-Hop Songs (Billboard)	5
US Rhythmic Airplay (Billboard)	27

=== Year-end charts ===
Chart (1999)	Position
Belgium (Ultratop 50 Flanders)	3
Belgium (Ultratop 50 Wallonia)	10
Europe (Eurochart Hot 100)	18
Germany (Media Control)	40
Netherlands (Dutch Top 40)	17
Netherlands (Single Top 100)	6
Sweden (Hitlistan)	77
Switzerland (Schweizer Hitparade)	40
UK Singles (OCC)	17
US Hot R&B/Hip-Hop Singles & Tracks (Billboard)	64

Chart (2000)	Position
Austria (Ö3 Austria Top 40)	19
Belgium (Ultratop 50 Flanders)	41
Belgium (Ultratop 50 Wallonia)	28
Europe (Eurochart Hot 100)	8
France (SNEP)	12
Germany (Media Control)	29
Ireland (IRMA)	83
Netherlands (Single Top 100)	93
Sweden (Hitlistan)	42
Switzerland (Schweizer Hitparade)	9

=== Decade-end charts ===
Chart (1990–1999)	Position
Belgium (Ultratop 50 Flanders)	8

== Certifications ==
Region	Certification	Certified units/sales
Austria (IFPI Austria)	Gold	25,000^{*}
Belgium (BRMA)	3× Platinum	150,000^{*}
France (SNEP)	Gold	250,000^{*}
Germany (BVMI)	Platinum	500,000^{^}
Netherlands (NVPI)	Platinum	75,000^{^}
Sweden (GLF)	Platinum	30,000^{^}
Switzerland (IFPI Switzerland)	Gold	25,000^{^}
United Kingdom (BPI)	Platinum	660,000
United States (RIAA)	Gold	500,000
^{*} Sales figures based on certification alone.^{^} Shipments figures based on certification alone.

== Release history ==
Region	Date	Format(s)	Label(s)	Ref.
United States	July 27, 1999	Rhythmic contemporary; contemporary hit radio	Jive	
United States	August 3, 1999	Urban AC; urban radio	Jive	
United States	August 9, 1999	Adult contemporary radio	Jive	
United States	September 21, 1999	7-inch vinyl; 12-inch vinyl; CD; cassette	Jive	
United Kingdom	October 18, 1999	12-inch vinyl; CD; cassette	Jive	
