= Wanksta =

Single by 50 Cent

from the album No Mercy, No Fear, 8 Mile: Music from and Inspired by the Motion Picture and Get Rich or Die Tryin'
- Released: November 5, 2002
- Recorded: 2001
- Genre: Hip hop; gangsta rap
- Length: 3:44
- Label: Shady; Interscope; Aftermath; UMG
- Songwriters: Michael Clervoix; Curtis Jackson; John Freeman
- Producers: Sha Money XL; John "J-Praize" Freeman

50 Cent singles chronology
"Your Life's on the Line" (1999)	"Wanksta" (2002)	"In da Club" (2003)

Music video
- "Wanksta" on YouTube

"Wanksta" is a song by American rapper 50 Cent, released on November 5, 2002, as the third single from the soundtrack to the film 8 Mile (2002). The single, produced by Sha Money XL and John "J-Praize" Freeman, reached number 13 on the US Billboard Hot 100. The song originally appeared on 50 Cent's mixtape No Mercy, No Fear, released in August 2002.

== Background ==
"Wanksta" was 50 Cent's first single to chart after signing to Eminem's and Dr. Dre's labels, Shady Records and Aftermath Entertainment, as well as his first single to be released since "Thug Love" in 1999. Originally appearing on his 2002 mixtape, No Mercy, No Fear, it received a lot of airplay, and was eventually added to the 8 Mile soundtrack later the same year. It was then added as a bonus track on his 2003 debut album, Get Rich or Die Tryin'.

Eminem also made a remix, in 2003, aimed at Ja Rule and tweaked the beat to sound high pitched. The song appeared on the CD single box set The Singles.

The instrumental for the song was used for "Crackin", a song by The Psychopathic Rydas, in 2004. It was also used by Murder Inc. artist Black Child in his 50 Cent diss track "You Da Wanksta" in 2002.

R&B girl group Blaque recorded an answer song entitled "No Ganksta" in 2003.

50 cent opens the song with the lyrics "I got a lot of livin' to do before I die and I ain't got no time to waste...let's make it" which he took from the intro to Nina Simone's 1968 recording of "Do What You Gotta Do."

== Etymology ==
The title is generally accepted as a portmanteau word meaning "self-obsessed, show-off person". The precise origin is debated, although most theories suggest a blend of "gangsta" and "wannabe". The term had previously been used in the 1999 track Q.B.G. from The Tunnel, a collaborative album by American DJs Funkmaster Flex and Big Kap. 50 Cent has explicitly stated that the word is not related to the British colloquialism "wanker":

Jake Arnott: And another claim to fame: you introduced the word 'wanksta' into the language with your track 'Wanksta'. That word sort of means something in England — does it mean the same in America?

50 Cent: Nah, nah! 'Wanksta's like... we use that terminology to mean a fake gangster. When people told me about the word 'wanker'...

50 Cent may however have simply been unaware of the origin of this established slang term.

The song's lyrics were believed to be directed towards long time nemesis Ja Rule, but 50 Cent disputed this himself in a MuchMusic interview, stating that while the song itself was not directed at Ja, he was a good example of a wanksta.

== Charts ==
=== Weekly charts ===
Chart (2002–2003)	Peak position
US Billboard Hot 100	13
US Hot R&B/Hip-Hop Songs (Billboard)	4
US Hot Rap Songs (Billboard)	3
US Rhythmic Airplay (Billboard)	6

=== Year-end charts ===
Chart (2003)	Position
US Billboard Hot 100	63
US Hot R&B/Hip-Hop Songs (Billboard)	34

== Certifications ==
Region	Certification	Certified units/sales
New Zealand (RMNZ)	Gold	15,000^{‡}
United Kingdom (BPI)	Silver	200,000^{‡}
United States (RIAA)	Platinum	1,000,000^{‡}
^{‡} Sales+streaming figures based on certification alone.
