= Home Alone (song) =

1998 single by R. Kelly

Single by R. Kelly featuring Keith Murray

from the album R.
- Released: October 19, 1998
- Length: 4:59 (album version); 4:17 (radio edit)
- Label: Jive
- Songwriters: Robert Kelly; Kelly Price; Keith Murray; George Archie
- Producers: G-One; DJ Quik

R. Kelly singles chronology
"I'm Your Angel" (1998)	"Home Alone" (1998)	"When a Woman's Fed Up" (1999)

Keith Murray singles chronology
"Full Cooperation" (1998)	"Home Alone" (1998)	"Independence Day" (1998)

"Home Alone" is a single by American musician R. Kelly, released from his third solo studio album, R. The song features rapper Keith Murray and uncredited vocals from Kelly Price. It was produced by G-One & DJ Quik. "Home Alone" was the fifth single from the album and charted at number 65 on the US Billboard Hot 100. Its chart success was better abroad, reaching the top 40 in Canada, France and the United Kingdom. In Canada, it topped the RPM Dance chart.

== Music video ==
The music video was directed by Hype Williams and was shot at the mansion R. Kelly owned at that time.

== Live performance ==
Kelly often raps Keith Murray's part at his concerts.

== Charts ==
=== Weekly charts ===
Weekly chart performance for "Home Alone"
Chart (1998–1999)	Peak position
Canada Top Singles (RPM)	15
Canada Dance/Urban (RPM)	1
Europe (Eurochart Hot 100)	71
France (SNEP)	39
Germany (GfK)	82
Netherlands (Dutch Top 40 Tipparade)	13
Netherlands (Single Top 100)	70
New Zealand (Recorded Music NZ)	43
Scottish Singles Sales (Official Charts)	51
Sweden (Sverigetopplistan)	60
UK Singles (Official Charts)	17
UK Dance (Official Charts)	5
UK Hip Hop/R&B (Official Charts)	5
US Billboard Hot 100	65
US Hot R&B Singles & Tracks (Billboard)	22
US Rhythmic Top 40 (Billboard)	21

=== Year-end charts ===
Year-end chart performance for "Home Alone"
Chart (1999)	Position
Canada Top Singles (RPM)	97
Canada Dance/Urban (RPM)	5
US Rhythmic Top 40 (Billboard)	66

== Release history ==
Release dates and formats for "Home Alone"
Region	Date	Format(s)	Label(s)	Ref.
United States	October 19, 1998	Urban radio	Jive	
United Kingdom	November 2, 1998	12-inch vinyl; CD; cassette	Jive	
