= Life's on the Line =

"Your Life's on the Line"

Single by 50 Cent

from the album Power of the Dollar and Get Rich or Die Tryin'
- Released: October 12, 1999
- Recorded: The Hit Factory, NYC
- Genre: East Coast hip hop; gangsta rap; hardcore hip hop
- Length: 3:38
- Label: Columbia
- Songwriters: Curtis Jackson; Terence Dudley
- Producer: Terence Dudley

50 Cent singles chronology
"Thug Love" (1999)	"Your Life's on the Line" (1999)	"Wanksta" (2002)

"Your Life's on the Line" is a song by rapper 50 Cent, from his shelved debut studio album Power of the Dollar (2000). The song was released as the third and final single from the album on October 12, 1999, and peaked at number 37 on the Billboard Hot Rap Singles chart. It contains a diss towards rapper Ja Rule and his record label Murder Inc. The song contains interpolation from Onyx's song "Nigga Bridges" and a line that is similar to dialogue from a scene in the movie 48 Hrs.

"Your Life's on the Line" is 50 Cent's final release for Columbia Records, from which he was dropped after he was shot nine times in May 2000.

== Background ==
"Your Life's on the Line" is included on 50 Cent's first two studio albums: it appears as track 5 on his unofficially released 2000 debut album Power of the Dollar and, as a bonus track, as track 19 on his 2003 commercial debut album Get Rich or Die Tryin'. In his review of Power of the Dollar, Jason Birchmeier of AllMusic states that the song "conveys street life through hard, violent rhythms". It was the first diss track dropped by 50 to counter "Murda 4 Life" in the infamous Ja Rule vs 50 Cent feud.

The song was originally recorded as a demo titled "Nobody Likes Me" and featured direct disses at Ja Rule and Puffy. This version features the same beat and the same hook, but has two verses instead of three. Both verses contain some lyrics heard on the album version, which sees 50 Cent combining the two together to make a new first verse, then adding a new second and third.

== Track listing ==
- 12-inch single (United States)
1. "Your Life's on the Line" (clean album version) – 3:43
2. "Your Life's on the Line" (explicit album version) – 3:43
3. "Your Life's on the Line" (instrumental) – 3:43
4. "Your Life's on the Line" (explicit acapella) – 3:16
5. "The Good Die Young" (clean album version) – 4:08
6. "The Good Die Young" (explicit album version) – 4:08
7. "The Good Die Young" (instrumental) – 4:14
8. "The Good Die Young" (explicit acapella) – 3:59

== Music video ==
The music videos for "Your Life's on the Line" and the In Too Deep soundtrack single "Rowdy Rowdy" were produced prior to 50 Cent's 2000 shooting, which preceded the planned filming of the music video for "Thug Love" by two days. The music video starts with a statement explaining how the footage went missing, but was later found, then proceeds with scenes of 50 Cent rapping in various areas of New York City, getting arrested, and rapping while in the police car. The video features a cameo appearance from rapper Tony Yayo.

== Chart positions ==
Chart (2000)	Peak position
US Billboard Hot Rap Singles	37
