= Guess Who's Back? =

2002 mixtape by 50 Cent

Mixtape by 50 Cent
- Released: April 26, 2002
- Recorded: 2001–2002, Canada
- Genres: Gangsta rap; East Coast hip hop
- Length: 56:11
- Label: Full Clip
- Producers: Trackmasters; Kurt Gowdy; DJ Clark Kent; Father Shaheed; Nottz; Sha Money XL; Red Spyda; Terence Dudley; Fantom of the Beat

50 Cent chronology
Power of the Dollar (2000)	Guess Who's Back? (2002)	50 Cent Is the Future (2002)

Guess Who's Back? is the debut official mixtape by American rapper 50 Cent, released April 26, 2002 on independent label Full Clip Records in the United States. It is his first official release after his 2000 effort Power of the Dollar went unreleased due to Columbia Records' discovery of a May 2000 shooting where 50 Cent was struck by nine bullets, and was subsequently dropped from the label as a result. The album features production by Trackmasters, DJ Clark Kent, Father Shaheed, Sha Money XL, Red Spyda, and Terence Dudley. Guess Who's Back? received generally positive reviews from music critics and peaked at number 28 on the U.S. Billboard 200 chart.

== Background ==
The mixtape was recorded in Canada after 50 Cent was "blacklisted" in the recording industry and was unable to find a studio to work with in the U.S.

After releasing the mixtape, 50 Cent was discovered by Detroit rapper Eminem, who listened to a copy of the album through 50 Cent's attorney, who was working with Eminem's manager, Paul Rosenberg, and he was signed to Interscope Records.

The tracks "Your Life's on the Line", "Corner Bodega", "Ghetto Qur'an (Forgive Me)" and "As the World Turns" were originally to be released on 50 Cent's shelved album, Power of the Dollar. "Killa Tape" and "That's What's Up" would later appear on the mixtape, 50 Cent Is the Future. "U Not Like Me" and "Life's on the Line" would later appear on 50 Cent's debut studio album, Get Rich or Die Tryin'. As of May 2004, the album has sold over 400,000 copies in the United States. The album's cover art was later used in the video for 50 Cent's song, "Piggy Bank".

== Critical reception ==
Professional ratings
Review scores
Source	Rating
AllMusic	4/5 stars
Blender	4/5 stars
Robert Christgau	(1-star Honorable Mention)
RapReviews	8/10
The Rolling Stone Album Guide	3.5/5 stars
Village Voice	favorable

Retrospectively, in a 2025 ranking of twenty 50 Cent albums and mixtapes, Al Shipley of Spin magazine placed Guess Who's Back? third, deeming it 50 Cent's "most essential pre-Interscope project" due to its inclusion of some of the best Power of the Dollar songs, such as "Corner Bodega" and "Ghetto Qur'an (Forgive Me)".

== Track listing ==
Guess Who's Back? track listing
No.	Title	Producer(s)	Length
1.	"Killa Tape (Intro)"	Trackmasters	2:58
2.	"Rotten Apple"	Haas G	3:08
3.	"Drop (Skit)"	50 Cent	4:10
4.	"That's What's Up"" (G-Unit)	True Master	4:09
5.	"U Not Like Me"	Red Spyda	4:10
6.	"50 Bars"	Sha Money XL	3:33
7.	"Your Life's on the Line"	Terence Dudley	3:38
8.	"Get Out the Club"	Father Shaheed	4:22
9.	"Be a Gentleman"	Nottz	2:40
10.	"Fuck You"	DJ Clark Kent	3:55
11.	"Too Hot" (featuring Nas and Nature)	Chop Diesel	3:45
12.	"Who U Rep With" (featuring Nas and Bravehearts)	Trackmasters	4:21
13.	"Corner Bodega"	L.E.S.	1:34
14.	"Ghetto Qur'an (Forgive Me)"	Trackmasters	4:29
15.	"As the World Turns" (featuring Bun B)	Red Spyda	4:15
16.	"Whoo Kid Freestyle"	DJ Whoo Kid	1:15
17.	"Stretch Armstrong Freestyle"	Carlos "Six July" Broady & Nashiem Myrick (samples "Reverse" by Puff Daddy featuring Shyne, G-Dep, Cee Lo, Busta Rhymes, Sauce Money and Redman)	1:19
18.	"Doo Wop Freestyle"	Erick Sermon (samples "Symphony" by EPMD featuring M.O.P.)	2:25

== Charts ==
Chart performance for Guess Who's Back?
Chart (2002–2003)	Peak position
UK Independent Albums (Official Charts)	6
UK Albums (Official Charts)	82
US Billboard 200	28
US Top R&B/Hip-Hop Albums (Billboard)	13
