= Piggy Bank (song) =

Song by 50 Cent

from the album The Massacre
- Released: 2005
- Recorded: 2004
- Genre: Gangsta rap
- Length: 4:15
- Label: G-Unit; Shady; Aftermath; Interscope
- Songwriters: Curtis Jackson; Khari Cain
- Producer: Needlz

Audio sample
- file; help

"Piggy Bank" is the fifth track from 50 Cent's second album, The Massacre. It was not released as a single, but charted at eighty-eight on the Billboard Hot 100 due to controversy over its attack on long-time rival Ja Rule, as well as Jadakiss and Fat Joe, who had worked with Ja Rule on his song "New York". The song also takes lyrical swipes at rappers Shyne, Kelis, Sheek Louch, Cassidy, Lil' Kim (who featured 50 Cent on her song "Magic Stick") and Nas. He also mentions Tupac Shakur, Jay-Z, Mobb Deep and Michael Jackson in the song, but not negatively.

== Song background ==
In 2004, Ja Rule released "New York", a song from his successful album, R.U.L.E.. The song was very well received by hip hop fans and featured appearances from fellow New York rappers Fat Joe and Jadakiss. 50 Cent states that he mostly attacked Jadakiss and Fat Joe for their partnering with Ja Rule, who was, in essence, recording a 50 Cent diss song. According to 50 Cent, the two had allegedly been making subliminal disses to him in the past.

The song features vocal samples from the song "Сонет 90" (Sonet 90) performed by Russian singer Alla Pugacheva and included in her 1978 album Zerkalo dushi.

=== Shyne ===
50 was in the process of building his legacy at this point and went to speak to Shyne, while he was imprisoned, about becoming a member of G-Unit. Shyne refused.

Shyne first came under 50's fire when he began talks with Ja Rule to sign to Murder Inc. while in jail. As a result, 50 mentioned Shyne in a mixtape freestyle that found its way to Shyne, who was in prison for firing a handgun in a New York club. Shyne then responded, over telephone, with his own freestyle, where he threatened to handle their rivalry violently. It was for this freestyle, that he was added to the Piggy Bank attack.

=== Nas ===
In 2002, there were circulated rumors throughout the rap industry that Nas was in talks with Irv Gotti to sign to Murder Inc. Although the rumors proved false, they did not help strengthen ties between Nas and 50 Cent. Initially, the two had been relatively close associates, with Nas featuring in two tracks on 50 Cent's 2002 album Guess Who's Back?. However, time led to the two becoming estranged. 50 Cent cites Nas's erratic behavior as a reason for his distrust. 50 notes that while Nas has in the past stood for peace, he was also the same person on June 27, 2002, that although unprovoked, verbally attacked several rappers including Cam'ron, Nelly, N.O.R.E. and New York Hot97 radio disc jockey Angie Martinez. Nas later apologized to those he had attacked, reverting to his previous peaceful beliefs.

It is also speculated that bad blood originated between the two as a result of 50 Cent being replaced as the guest star on a remix of a popular Jennifer Lopez song ("I'm Gonna Be Alright"). After he had been shot, his producers, Trackmasters, allegedly dropped him from the song for Nas. It is possible that mistrust between the rappers developed because of this. It is also worth noting that Nas was working with Irv Gotti, who had arranged the song. 50's rapping on the song was also removed in the international editions from her remix album. Also Nas dissed 50 Cent on stage at a free concert in Central Park in August 2004, where he said: "Represent that real New York s**t, not that fake 50 Cent".

=== References to other rappers ===
"Piggy Bank" contains several references to the rap community:

- In one line 50 Cent tells Jadakiss: "Jada don't fuck wit' me if you wanna eat/I'll do yo lil ass like Jay did Mobb Deep" Though the line referenced Mobb Deep, it was not negatively directed towards them. In addition, Mobb Deep would later sign to 50's label G-Unit Records.
- 50 Cent mocks the line from the chorus of Ja Rule's "New York"," I got a hundred guns, a hundred clips, nigga, I'm from New York" by changing it in the first verse of "Piggy Bank", "Got a hundred guns, a hundred clips, why don't I hear no shots?"
- The second verse has the line "Shyne poppin off his mouth from a cell, he don't want it wit me, he in PC, I could have a nigga run up on him with a shank...", which 50 Cent says about Shyne when he was in jail, and showing him in jail in his video.
- The second verse contains the line "Freak bitch look like Kim before the surgery" which refers to Lil' Kim's plastic surgery.
- The second verse contains the line "Kelis said her milkshake bring all the boys to the yard, then Nas went, and tattooed the bitch on his arm" which refers to Kelis's song "Milkshake" and Nas's decision of having Kelis tattooed on his arm.
- The first verse contains the line "That fat nigga thought "Lean Back" was "In Da Club", My shit sold 11 mill, his shit was a dud." Which refers to Fat Joe's believing that his song, "Lean Back", was as big a success as his own smash hit, "In Da Club", as Get Rich or Die Tryin' sold over 11 million copies worldwide, and Fat Joe's album had lower sales figures.
- In the hook/chorus, 50 says "2Pac don't pretend". This is a diss to Ja Rule as 50 believed Ja Rule was trying to copy 2Pac's gangsta personality.

Though not mentioned in the actual song, rapper Cassidy is parodied as a young boy wearing a pink hoodie that says "I'm a hustla" and gets punched by a couple of other young kids at a subway station. This diss was in response to Cassidy's video "B-Boy Stance" where he parodies 50 Cent as a homosexual stripper wearing tight black underwear that says "B-Unit" on the back. Cassidy claims that he dissed 50 Cent because he was saying negative comments and beefing with artists Fat-Joe and Jadakiss who Cassidy says he was friends with and that they showed him a lot of support in the beginning of his career.

=== Charts ===
Weekly chart performance for Piggy Bank
Chart (2005)	Peak position
US Billboard Hot 100	88
US Hot R&B/Hip-Hop Songs (Billboard)	64

== Music video ==
The music video for the song was computer-animated. It features parodies of Fat Joe resembling King Hippo of Mike Tyson's Punch-Out!! and 50 Cent as a boxer, fighting him, and also getting squashed by a Mercedes-Benz car later in the video. After this, 50 Cent fights Jadakiss, who is made to look like a Teenage Mutant Ninja Turtle. The video shows Nas dressed up liked Superman (with instead of the Superman tag on his chest, says his name instead, but normally, his name is censored) chasing after his wife, Kelis, in an ice cream truck labelled "Milkshake", and Shyne (popping off his mouth) in jail. The video was produced after The Game was expelled from G-Unit. Although, The Game is mentioned in a positive way in the song since it was recorded before the rift between them, a parody of The Game as Mr. Potato Head is shown. Also, Philadelphia rapper Cassidy is shown as a young kid in a pink hoody with "I'm a Hustla" printed on it and later in the video he is shown being punched. The video shows 50 Cent and G-Unit in it, with 50 Cent being a boxer and a gangsta, holding guns, which is normally censored. The video makes a reference of "Gatman and Robbin," the next track on The Massacre after "Piggy Bank". The music video on YouTube has received over 15 million views as of April 2024.
