= Half on a Baby =

1998 single by R. Kelly

Single by R. Kelly

from the album R.
- Released: August 31, 1998
- Length: 4:55 (album version); 5:01 (radio version); 5:42 (extended version)
- Label: Jive
- Songwriter: Robert Kelly
- Producer: R. Kelly

R. Kelly singles chronology
"Friend of Mine (Remix)" (1998)	"Half on a Baby" (1998)	"I'm Your Angel" (1998)

"Half on a Baby" is a song by American R&B singer R. Kelly from his third solo album, R.. Written and produced by Kelly, it was released to radio stations as the first single from the album in August 1998, but was not available for purchase in stores in the United States. The song reached the top 20 in the United Kingdom, the Netherlands, and New Zealand. A video was released for the song. The song was written and produced by Kelly.

== Music video ==
The music video was directed by Hype Williams.

== Charts ==
=== Weekly charts ===
Chart (1998–1999)	Peak position
Australia (ARIA)	120
Canada Adult Contemporary (RPM)	15
Europe (Eurochart Hot 100)	52
Germany (GfK)	38
Netherlands (Dutch Top 40)	14
Netherlands (Single Top 100)	19
New Zealand (Recorded Music NZ)	18
Scottish Singles Sales (Official Charts)	56
Switzerland (Schweizer Hitparade)	43
UK Singles (Official Charts)	16
UK Dance (Official Charts)	24
UK Hip Hop/R&B (Official Charts)	5
UK Indie (Official Charts)	4
US Hot R&B/Hip-Hop Songs (Billboard)	61
US Rhythmic Airplay (Billboard)	32

=== Year-end charts ===
Chart (1998)	Position
Canada Adult Contemporary (RPM)	83

== Release history ==
Region	Date	Format(s)	Label(s)	Ref.
United States	August 31, 1998	Urban radio	Jive	
United States	September 1, 1998	Rhythmic contemporary radio	Jive	
United Kingdom	September 14, 1998	CD; cassette	Jive	
