= Get Rich or Die Tryin' =

2003 studio album by 50 Cent

Studio album by 50 Cent
- Released: February 6, 2003
- Recorded: 2002
- Studios: Lobo Studios (Deerpark, New York); 54 Sound (Detroit); Encore (Burbank, California); Teamwork Studios (Long Island, New York); The Disc (Eastpointe, Michigan); Chung King Studios (New York City); The Hit Factory (New York City)
- Genres: East Coast hip-hop; hardcore hip-hop; gangsta rap
- Length: 53:44
- Labels: Interscope; G-Unit; Shady; Aftermath; Violator
- Producers: Dr. Dre; Eminem; Sha Money XL; Sean Blaze; Darrell Branch; Dirty Swift; DJ Matty Kats; DJ Rad; Terence Dudley; Mike Elizondo; John "J-Praize" Freeman; Megahertz; Mr. Porter; Red Spyda; Reef; Rockwilder

50 Cent chronology
| God's Plan (2002) | Get Rich or Die Tryin' (2003) | The Massacre (2005) |

Singles from Get Rich or Die Tryin'
- 1. "In da Club" Released: January 7, 2003; 2. "21 Questions" Released: March 4, 2003; 3. "P.I.M.P." Released: June 24, 2003; 4. "If I Can't" Released: September 16, 2003

Get Rich or Die Tryin' is the debut studio album by American rapper 50 Cent. It was released on February 6, 2003, by Interscope Records, G-Unit Records, Shady Records and Aftermath Entertainment. After signing with Eminem, 50 Cent also worked heavily with Dr. Dre and Eminem both acting as the album's executive producers, who worked to combine the gangsta rap and R&B combo prevalent in New York hip-hop. Additional production is provided by Mike Elizondo, Sha Money XL (who also executive-produced the album), Mr. Porter, Rockwilder, Dirty Swift, Megahertz, and more.

The album also contains guest appearances from Eminem, Young Buck, and Nate Dogg, as well as features from G-Unit co-members Lloyd Banks and Tony Yayo. Before the album, 50 Cent released several mixtapes alongside the Trackmasters, and in 2000 recorded an unreleased album titled Power of the Dollar, which was supposed to be his first. However, after suffering legal troubles and being blackballed from the music industry, 50 Cent found difficulty in securing another major-label recording contract until he signed with Eminem's Shady Records in 2002.

Released a week in advance to combat bootlegging and Internet leakage, Get Rich or Die Tryin' debuted and peaked at number one on the Billboard 200, selling over 872,000 copies in its first week of sales. The album's singles also saw worldwide success, with both "In da Club" and "21 Questions" reaching number one on the Billboard Hot 100, while "P.I.M.P." became a number one hit in several countries. The album was ranked number one on the Billboard Year-End 2003 and received general acclaim from music critics.

Get Rich or Die Tryin' was ranked by several publications as one of the best albums of the 2000s. In 2020, it was certified 9× Platinum by the Recording Industry Association of America (RIAA). It was the best-selling album of 2003 in the US, and was nominated for Best Rap Album at the 46th Annual Grammy Awards. It won Favorite Rap/Hip-Hop Album at 2003 American Music Awards and Top Billboard 200 Album at the 2003 Billboard Music Awards. In 2020, Rolling Stone ranked the album number 280 on their updated 500 Greatest Albums of All Time list.

== Background ==
Prior to the release of his first studio album, titled Power of the Dollar, 50 Cent was shot nine times in Queens, New York, on May 24, 2000. He survived but was dropped from his label, Columbia Records, who canceled the album's release. Seeking to avoid another encounter with his shooter, 50 Cent traveled out to Westbury, Long Island, at the invitation of producer Sha Money XL and began recording mixtapes there. During this period, 50 Cent also recorded several songs that would ultimately appear on Get Rich or Die Tryin'; he recalls that, when he completed a song that he was especially impressed by, he would decline to release the song and instead save it for his eventual studio debut.

According to 50 Cent in March 2002, he was already in talks with J Records, Universal Records, and Jive Records to release his debut album titled Get Rich or Die Tryin' via his own then imprint, Rotten Apple Entertainment. In 2002, Eminem listened to a copy of 50 Cent's Guess Who's Back? mixtape album through Jackson's attorney, who was working with Eminem's manager Paul Rosenberg. After being impressed with the mixtape, Eminem invited 50 Cent to Los Angeles where he was introduced to producer Dr. Dre. 50 Cent signed a one-million-dollar record deal with Eminem and Dr. Dre; 50 Cent then released his next mixtape, No Mercy, No Fear to gain more buzz. It featured his own 8 Mile single, "Wanksta" (in addition to appearances on three other tracks from the album), which was later put on Get Rich or Die Tryin'. "Wanksta" began to attract attention from radio DJs throughout the United States, building hype for 50 Cent's forthcoming album.

Both Eminem and Dr. Dre had started producing tracks on his debut album with additional help from producers Mike Elizondo, Sha Money XL, and others. 50 Cent's second commercial single, "In da Club", was the first of seven tracks he recorded in five days with Dr. Dre. Eminem was featured on two songs, "Patiently Waiting" and "Don't Push Me". His songs also featured rappers within G-Unit such as Lloyd Banks ("Don't Push Me"), Tony Yayo ("Like My Style"), or Young Buck ("Blood Hound"). "Back Down" was an instrumental originally intended to be used on Rakim's debut Aftermath album, Oh My God, but due to creative differences was not released. Early pressings of Get Rich or Die Tryin' included a limited edition bonus DVD.

The album title originates as a tattoo on Sha Money XL's arm. The album artwork of Get Rich or Die Tryin' was designed by Julian Alexander and Sacha Waldman. Featuring a shirtless 50 Cent standing behind a broken glass pane, it has been described as "among the most recognizable [album covers] in rap history". 50 Cent commented about the title:

"When you listen to that title, it might feel a little negative, right? But if you're a working class person and you say 'get rich or die trying' then it means that you're determined."

== Lyricism and composition ==
=== Lyricism ===
Get Rich or Die Tryin' is a gangsta rap album. 50 Cent has stated that his goal was to write lyrics that were evocative enough to capture listeners' imaginations, while also being "vague enough not to daunt them". Despite this, he does venture into more explicit detail on some tracks, like "Many Men" and the Ja Rule diss "Back Down". On the whole, the writing on the album has been described as "smooth[ing] out" the feel of his mixtapes into a more generally accessible format; tracks such as "In da Club" show 50 Cent particularly aiming to depict widely relatable experiences. 50 Cent has stated that he limited the amount of vulnerability he would display on the album; on tracks like "Many Men", he aimed to balance the vulnerability of the lyrical content with aggressive deliveries and production.

The single "21 Questions" was initially added to the album's tracklist against Dr. Dre's wishes. According to 50 Cent, "Dre was, like, 'How you goin' to be gangsta this and that and then put this sappy love song on?'" 50 Cent responded saying, "I'm two people. I've always had to be two people since I was a kid, to get by. To me that's not diversity, it's necessity." "21 Questions" has also been noted as, along with "Many Men", one of the few slow-tempo tracks on the album.

An earlier version of "Back Down" allegedly also targets Kenneth "Supreme" McGriff, Jay-Z, R. Kelly, Nas, Cam’ron and others; however, Dr. Dre considered the song too incendiary and told 50 Cent to tone down the lyrics and only target Ja Rule.

== Singles and promotion ==
The album's lead single, "In da Club", which was released to digital download on January 7, 2003, was certified platinum by the Recording Industry Association of America (RIAA), becoming 50 Cent's first song to top the Billboard Hot 100 for nine weeks and remained on the charts for twenty-two weeks. The track also reached number one on the Top 40 Tracks, Hot R&B/Hip-Hop Songs, and Hot Rap Tracks charts. The song reached number one in Denmark, Germany, Ireland, and Switzerland and the top five in Austria, Belgium, Finland, Greece, Norway, Sweden, the Netherlands, and the United Kingdom. It received two Grammy nominations for Best Male Rap Solo Performance and Best Rap Song. It was listed at number 18 on VH1's "100 Greatest Hip-Hop Songs of All Time".

Its second single, "21 Questions", which was released to digital download on March 4 of that same year, became 50 Cent's second chart topper on the Billboard Hot 100, where it remained for four non-consecutive weeks. It spent seven weeks on top of the Billboard Hot R&B/Hip-Hop Songs charts. Outside the States, "21 Questions" reached number six in the United Kingdom. It was certified gold by the RIAA. The third single "P.I.M.P.", which was released to urban contemporary radio on June 24, was shipped with a remix featuring rapper Snoop Dogg and trio-group G-Unit. It was the third single that peaked at number three on the Billboard Hot 100 and number one on "Hot Rap Tracks", becoming the third single from the album to peak in the top ten on the "Hot 100" chart. It also reached number one in Canada. It was certified Gold by RIAA. The album's final single, "If I Can't", peaked at number seventy-six on the Billboard Hot 100 and thirty-four on the Hot R&B/Hip-Hop Songs charts.

After the album's release, 50 Cent toured extensively in its support. Throughout 2003, he performed 84 concerts in the United States, Europe, and the Middle East.

== Critical reception ==
Professional ratings
Aggregate scores
| Source | Rating |
|---|---|
| Metacritic | 73/100 |
Review scores
| Source | Rating |
| AllMusic | 4/5 stars |
| Blender | 4/5 stars |
| Entertainment Weekly | B |
| The Guardian | 3/5 stars |
| Los Angeles Times | 3/4 stars |
| Pitchfork | 7.0/10 |
| Q | 4/5 stars |
| Rolling Stone | 4/5 stars |
| USA Today | 3/4 stars |
| XXL | 5/5 |

Get Rich or Die Tryin' received critical acclaim from contemporary music critics. At Metacritic, it holds an aggregate score of 73 out of 100, based on 19 reviews, indicating "generally favorable reviews".

In his review for USA Today, Steve Jones believed that the album is worthy of the hype 50 Cent had attracted because of how he "delivers, in vivid detail, stories of the violent life he led as a crack dealer and speaks with the swagger of one who has been shot nine times and lived to tell about it." AllMusic's Jason Birchmeier described it as "impressive" and "incredibly calculated", and identified it as "ushering in 50 as one of the truly eminent rappers of his era". Rolling Stone magazine's Christian Hoard praised the album's production and 50 Cent's "thug persona" and rapping ability. Brett Berliner of Stylus Magazine felt that he is versatile as a rapper and wrote that, "while not even close to perfection, [the album] is one of the freshest to come out in years." It is one of only 19 rap albums to receive a perfect rating from XXL magazine. Kelefa Sanneh of The New York Times wrote that 50 Cent is "an appealing, mischievous character" whose talent for threatening raps aimed toward rivals is also limiting thematically.

Robert Christgau was less enthusiastic in his consumer guide for The Village Voice and gave it a two-star honorable mention, indicating a "likable effort consumers attuned to its overriding aesthetic or individual vision may well enjoy." He cited "What Up Gangsta" and "Patiently Waiting" as highlights and said that 50 Cent "gets no cuter as his character unfolds" on the album.

=== Accolades ===
In December 2009, Billboard magazine ranked Get Rich or Die Tryin' at number 12 on its list of the Top 200 Albums of the Decade. In 2012, Complex named the album one of the classic releases of the last decade. The single, "In da Club", earned the number-one spot on Billboard 2003's single and album of the year charts, the first since Ace of Base had both in the same year. "Back Down" was listed on XXL's list of the greatest diss tracks of all time. The album was also included in the book 1001 Albums You Must Hear Before You Die. Get Rich or Die Tryin' was also ranked as the 139th best album of all time on the Billboard Top 200 Albums of All Time. In 2020, in their second revised edition of the 500 Greatest Albums of All Time list, Rolling Stone ranked Get Rich or Die Tryin' as the 280th greatest album of all time.

=== In popular culture ===
In the 2017 video game Paradigm, one of the records found inside Paradigm's home is Get Rich or Die of Natural Causes, a reference to the album.

In 2024, media personality Charlamagne Tha God released his third book Get Honest or Die Lying: Why Small Talk Sucks, which models its title on 50 Cent's album.

== Commercial performance ==
Get Rich or Die Tryin' debuted at number one on the Billboard 200 chart, selling 872,000 copies in its first week. In its second week, the album sold an additional 822,000 copies. It was the best-selling album of 2003, selling 13 million copies worldwide to date. It remains 50 Cent's best-selling album, with certified sales of 9 million copies in the United States, and is the tenth best-selling hip-hop album in the country. The album was certified 9× Platinum by the Recording Industry Association of America (RIAA) in 2020 for shipping nine million copies in the US. In 2003, Get Rich or Die Tryin' was ranked as the number one album of the year on the Billboard 200.

== Legacy ==
Get Rich or Die Tryin' is credited with restoring gangsta rap to prominence in an era when prevailing trends favored "slick, flashy ladies-man rappers" and radio-friendly R&B collaborations. Denaun Porter states that the album "shifted everybody's view of music" and led to a wave of stylistic imitators. 50 Cent's swaggering, unrepentant persona on Get Rich Or Die Tryin' has led him to be described as "rap's most charming antihero since 2Pac".

“This guy has eclipsed anything that’s happened in pop or rock on the channel in a couple of years. I think some of the kids that are buying the 50 album also have Linkin Park and Metallica and other rock stuff in their home libraries.”

— Tom Calderone, MTV programming executive

In addition, the album was noted for blending 50 Cent's own aggressive and gangster persona with numerous catchy, radio-friendly and quotable hooks, which significantly contributed its crossover success to an audience not normally accustomed to rap music. Chris Campion once stated that while 50 Cent was not the most skilled rapper or wordsmith, "he has an ear for melody that has fixed his records in the upper reaches of the pop charts."

In a 2013 retrospective, Billboard states that the album "rewrote the hip-hop rulebook". Neil Kulkarni of Crack states that Get Rich or Die Tryin' combined "Southern-style textures with gritty East Coast lyrical content" in a way that many succeeding artists would strive to replicate, and argues that the album's success paved the way for future gangsta rap artists including Jeezy, Rick Ross, and the Game. 50 Cent has also been credited with inspiring later rappers to write more overtly about their "personal turmoil".

Sha Money XL credits the album's success to the memorability of 50 Cent's background:

A lot of rappers, they just come out with a song. And you either like the song or you don't. 50 not only came out with songs, he came out with a story that people could relate with – not getting shot, but the world being against him and him still being fearless and ready to challenge everyone. He gave the world a street story but on the highest level with the help of Eminem and Dre.

== Track listing ==
Get Rich or Die Tryin' track listing
| No. | Title | Writer(s) | Producer(s) | Length |
|---|---|---|---|---|
| 1. | "Intro" | | | 0:06 |
| 2. | "What Up Gangsta" | Curtis Jackson; Rob "Reef" Tewlow | Rob "Reef" Tewlow | 2:59 |
| 3. | "Patiently Waiting" (featuring Eminem) | Jackson; Marshall Mathers; Mike Elizondo; Luis Resto | Eminem, DJ Matty Kats | 4:48 |
| 4. | "Many Men (Wish Death)" | Jackson; Darrell Branch; Resto | Darrell "Digga" Branch; Eminem^{[a]}; Resto^{[a]} | 4:16 |
| 5. | "In da Club" | Jackson; Andre Young; Elizondo | Dr. Dre; Elizondo^{[b]} | 3:13 |
| 6. | "High All the Time" | Jackson; Mathers; Michael Clervoix; Conrad Almonacy; Resto | DJ Rad; Eminem^{[b]}; Sha Money XL^{[b]} | 4:29 |
| 7. | "Heat" (removed from clean version) | Jackson; Young; Tommy Coster; Elizondo | Dr. Dre | 4:14 |
| 8. | "If I Can't" | Jackson; Young; Elizondo | Dr. Dre; Elizondo^{[b]} | 3:16 |
| 9. | "Blood Hound" (featuring Young Buck) | Jackson; David Brown; Sean Henderson | Sean Blaze | 4:00 |
| 10. | "Back Down" | Jackson; Young; Ron Feemster; Elizondo | Dr. Dre | 4:03 |
| 11. | "P.I.M.P." | Jackson; Denaun Porter | Mr. Porter | 4:09 |
| 12. | "Like My Style" (featuring Tony Yayo) | Jackson; Marvin Bernard; Dana Stinson | Rockwilder | 3:13 |
| 13. | "Poor Lil Rich" | Jackson; Clervoix | Sha Money XL; Eminem^{[a]} | 3:19 |
| 14. | "21 Questions" (featuring Nate Dogg) | Jackson; Kevin Risto | Dirty Swift | 3:44 |
| 15. | "Don't Push Me" (featuring Lloyd Banks and Eminem) | Jackson; Mathers; Christopher Lloyd; Resto | Eminem | 4:08 |
| 16. | "Gotta Make It to Heaven" | Jackson; Dorsey Wesley | Megahertz | 4:00 |
| Total length: | | | | 57:57 |

Bonus tracks
| No. | Title | Writer(s) | Producer(s) | Length |
|---|---|---|---|---|
| 17. | "Wanksta" | Jackson; John Freeman; Clervoix | Sha Money XL; John "J-Praize" Freeman | 3:39 |
| 18. | "U Not Like Me" | Jackson; Andy Thelusma | Red Spyda | 4:15 |
| 19. | "Life's on the Line" | Jackson; Terence Dudley | Terence Dudley | 3:38 |
| Total length: | | | | 69:29 |

Re-release bonus track
| No. | Title | Writer(s) | Producer(s) | Length |
|---|---|---|---|---|
| 20. | "P.I.M.P." (featuring Snoop Dogg, Lloyd Banks and Young Buck) | Jackson; Porter; Calvin Broadus; Lloyd; Brown | Mr. Porter | 4:49 |
| Total length: | | | | 74:18 |

Japan release bonus tracks
| No. | Title | Writer(s) | Producer(s) | Length |
|---|---|---|---|---|
| 20. | "In da Club" (instrumental) | Jackson; Young; Elizondo | Dr. Dre; Elizondo^{[b]} | 3:47 |
| 21. | "Soldier (Freestyle)" (featuring G-Unit) | Jackson; Mathers; Resto | Eminem | 3:44 |
| Total length: | | | | 78:02 |

United Kingdom bonus CD
| No. | Title | Writer(s) | Length |
|---|---|---|---|
| 1. | "In da Club" (a cappella) | Jackson; Young; Elizondo | 3:00 |
| Total length: | | | 60:57 |

Notes

- ^{^[a]} – additional production
- ^{^[b]} – co-producer

== Personnel ==
Credits are adapted from the physical album & AllMusic.

- 50 Cent – vocals/writer
- Justin Bendo – engineer
- Sean Blaze – producer, engineer
- Darrell Branch – producer
- Tommy Coster – keyboards
- Terence Dudley – producer
- Mike Elizondo – bass, guitar, keyboards, producer
- Dr. Dre – producer, executive producer, mixing
- Eminem – producer, executive producer, mixing, vocals
- John "J. Praize" Freeman – producer
- Steven King – producer, mixing
- Megahertz – producer
- Red Spyda – producer
- Luis Resto – keyboards
- Ruben Rivera – keyboards, assistant engineer
- Rockwilder – producer
- Tom Rounds – engineer
- Sha Money XL – producer, engineer
- Tracie Spencer – vocals
- Rob Tewlow – producer
- Patrick Viala – engineer
- Sacha Waldman – photography
- Ted Wohlsen – engineer
- Carlisle Young – engineer, digital editing
- DJ Matty Kats – producer
- DJ Rad – producer

== Charts ==
=== Weekly charts ===
Weekly chart performance for Get Rich or Die Tryin'
| Chart (2003) | Peak position |
|---|---|
| Australian Albums (ARIA) | 4 |
| Australian Urban Albums (ARIA) | 1 |
| Austrian Albums (Ö3 Austria) | 16 |
| Belgian Albums (Ultratop Flanders) | 3 |
| Belgian Albums (Ultratop Wallonia) | 14 |
| Canadian Albums (Billboard) | 1 |
| Canadian R&B Albums (Nielsen SoundScan) | 1 |
| Danish Albums (Hitlisten) | 6 |
| Dutch Albums (Album Top 100) | 5 |
| European Albums (Billboard) | 3 |
| Finnish Albums (Suomen virallinen lista) | 11 |
| French Albums (SNEP) | 12 |
| German Albums (Offizielle Top 100) | 4 |
| Greek Albums (IFPI) | 3 |
| Hungarian Albums (MAHASZ) | 17 |
| Irish Albums (IRMA) | 4 |
| Italian Albums (FIMI) | 13 |
| New Zealand Albums (RMNZ) | 3 |
| Norwegian Albums (VG-lista) | 5 |
| Scottish Albums (Official Charts) | 5 |
| Spanish Albums (PROMUSICAE) | 39 |
| Swedish Albums (Sverigetopplistan) | 8 |
| Swiss Albums (Schweizer Hitparade) | 8 |
| UK Albums (Official Charts) | 2 |
| US Billboard 200 | 1 |
| US Top R&B/Hip-Hop Albums (Billboard) | 1 |

| Chart (2026) | Peak position |
|---|---|
| German Hip-Hop Albums (Offizielle Top 100) | 13 |
| Portuguese Albums (AFP) | 74 |

=== Year-end charts ===
2003 year-end chart performance for Get Rich or Die Tryin'
| Chart (2003) | Position |
|---|---|
| Australian Albums (ARIA) | 22 |
| Austrian Albums (Ö3 Austria) | 69 |
| Belgian Albums (Ultratop Flanders) | 19 |
| Belgian Albums (Ultratop Wallonia) | 48 |
| Danish Albums (Hitlisten) | 37 |
| Dutch Albums (Album Top 100) | 22 |
| French Albums (SNEP) | 75 |
| German Albums (Offizielle Top 100) | 23 |
| Hungarian Albums (MAHASZ) | 68 |
| Irish Albums (IRMA) | 11 |
| New Zealand Albums (RMNZ) | 10 |
| Swedish Albums (Sverigetopplistan) | 32 |
| Swiss Albums (Schweizer Hitparade) | 27 |
| UK Albums (OCC) | 17 |
| US Billboard 200 | 1 |
| US Top R&B/Hip-Hop Albums (Billboard) | 1 |
| Worldwide Albums (IFPI) | 2 |

2004 year-end chart performance for Get Rich or Die Tryin'
| Chart (2004) | Position |
|---|---|
| UK Albums (OCC) | 99 |
| US Billboard 200 | 102 |
| US Top R&B/Hip-Hop Albums (Billboard) | 56 |

2020 year-end chart performance for Get Rich or Die Tryin'
| Chart (2020) | Position |
|---|---|
| Belgian Albums (Ultratop Flanders) | 192 |

2021 year-end chart performance for Get Rich or Die Tryin'
| Chart (2021) | Position |
|---|---|
| Belgian Albums (Ultratop Flanders) | 165 |

2022 year-end chart performance for Get Rich or Die Tryin'
| Chart (2022) | Position |
|---|---|
| Belgian Albums (Ultratop Flanders) | 135 |
| Danish Albums (Hitlisten) | 63 |
| Icelandic Albums (Tónlistinn) | 89 |
| UK Albums (OCC) | 82 |
| US Billboard 200 | 157 |

2023 year-end chart performance for Get Rich or Die Tryin'
| Chart (2023) | Position |
|---|---|
| Belgian Albums (Ultratop Flanders) | 103 |
| Belgian Albums (Ultratop Wallonia) | 173 |
| Danish Albums (Hitlisten) | 75 |
| Dutch Albums (Album Top 100) | 75 |
| Icelandic Albums (Tónlistinn) | 99 |
| New Zealand Albums (RMNZ) | 33 |
| Swiss Albums (Schweizer Hitparade) | 70 |
| UK Albums (OCC) | 72 |
| US Billboard 200 | 139 |

2024 year-end chart performance for Get Rich or Die Tryin'
| Chart (2024) | Position |
|---|---|
| Belgian Albums (Ultratop Flanders) | 80 |
| Belgian Albums (Ultratop Wallonia) | 171 |
| Danish Albums (Hitlisten) | 100 |
| Dutch Albums (Album Top 100) | 78 |
| Swiss Albums (Schweizer Hitparade) | 48 |
| UK Albums (OCC) | 89 |
| US Billboard 200 | 151 |
| US Top R&B/Hip-Hop Albums (Billboard) | 95 |

2025 year-end chart performance for Get Rich or Die Tryin'
| Chart (2025) | Position |
|---|---|
| Belgian Albums (Ultratop Flanders) | 92 |
| Belgian Albums (Ultratop Wallonia) | 197 |
| Dutch Albums (Album Top 100) | 82 |
| Swiss Albums (Schweizer Hitparade) | 41 |
| UK Albums (OCC) | 89 |

== Certifications ==
Certifications for Get Rich or Die Tryin'
| Region | Certification | Certified units/sales |
|---|---|---|
| Argentina (CAPIF) | Gold | 20,000^{^} |
| Australia (ARIA) | 2× Platinum | 140,000^{^} |
| Belgium (BRMA) | Platinum | 50,000^{*} |
| Canada (Music Canada) | 6× Platinum | 600,000^{^} |
| Denmark (IFPI Danmark) | 6× Platinum | 120,000^{‡} |
| France (SNEP) | Gold | 100,000^{*} |
| Germany (BVMI) | 5× Gold | 500,000^{‡} |
| Greece (IFPI Greece) | Gold | 10,000^{^} |
| Ireland (IRMA) | Platinum | 15,000^{^} |
| Japan (RIAJ) | Gold | 100,000^{^} |
| New Zealand (RMNZ) | 5× Platinum | 75,000^{‡} |
| Norway (IFPI Norway) | Gold | 20,000^{*} |
| Russia (NFPF) | 3× Platinum | 60,000^{*} |
| Sweden (GLF) | Gold | 30,000^{^} |
| Switzerland (IFPI Switzerland) | Platinum | 40,000^{^} |
| United Kingdom (BPI) | 6× Platinum | 1,800,000^{‡} |
| United States (RIAA) | 9× Platinum | 9,000,000^{‡} |
Summaries
| Europe (IFPI) | 2× Platinum | 2,000,000^{*} |
^{*} Sales figures based on certification alone.^{^} Shipments figures based on certification alone.^{‡} Sales+streaming figures based on certification alone.

== See also ==
- Get Rich or Die Tryin' (film)
- List of Billboard 200 number-one albums of 2003
