= In Too Deep (soundtrack) =

Soundtrack album by Various artists
- Released: August 17, 1999
- Recorded: 1998–1999
- Genres: Hip hop; R&B
- Length: 1:01:04
- Labels: Sony Music Soundtrax; Columbia Records
- Producers: Poke & Tone; Al West; Havoc; Dwayne Webb; Erick Sermon; Jermaine Dupri; Kid Capri; Larry Gates; Mark Curry; Michael Angelo; Timmy Allen

Singles from In Too Deep
- 1. "How to Rob" Released: 10 August 1999; 2. "Rowdy Rowdy" Released: 17 August 1999; 3. "Tear It Off" Released: 17 August 1999; 4. "Quiet Storm" Released: March 14, 1999 October 5, 1999 (remix)

Professional ratings
Review scores
Source	Rating
AllMusic	3/5 stars

In Too Deep: Music from the Dimension Motion Picture is the soundtrack to Michael Rymer's 1999 crime film In Too Deep. It was released on August 17, 1999, via Sony Music Soundtrax/Columbia Records, and contained hip hop and R&B music. The soundtrack fared well on the Billboard charts, peaking at #28 on the Billboard 200 and #8 on the Top R&B/Hip-Hop Albums chart. Also featured on the soundtrack was a then unknown 50 Cent's debut single "How to Rob", which made it to #62 on the Hot R&B/Hip-Hop Songs chart and #24 on the Hot Rap Singles chart. It featured six charting singles; "In Too Deep", "Keys to the Range", "How to Rob", "Rowdy Rowdy", "Tear It Off" and "Quiet Storm".

== Track listing ==
No.	Title	Producer(s)	Length
1.	"In Too Deep" (performed by Nas & Nature)	Larry "Precision" Gates	3:42
2.	"Tear It Off" (performed by Method Man & Redman)	Erick Sermon	4:12
3.	"The Specialist" (performed by Ali Vegas)	Mark Curry	3:32
4.	"Use to Me Spending" (performed by R. Kelly, Nokio & Jaz-Ming)	Poke and Tone	5:03
5.	"How to Rob" (performed by 50 Cent & Madd Rapper)	Poke and Tone	4:25
6.	"Thug Money" (performed by Trick Daddy)	Dwayne "Spiderweb" Webb	4:29
7.	"Keys to the Range" (performed by Jagged Edge & Jermaine Dupri)	Jermaine Dupri; Bryan-Michael Cox (co.)	3:47
8.	"Bleeding from the Mouth" (performed by Capone-N-Noreaga & The Lox)	Al West	3:25
9.	"Rowdy Rowdy" (performed by 50 Cent)	Kid Capri	3:39
10.	"Where Ya Heart At" (performed by Mobb Deep)	Havoc	4:27
11.	"Bust a Nut" (performed by The Product G&B & Marie Antoinette)	Al West	3:56
12.	"Give Me a Reason" (performed by Dave Hollister)	Poke and Tone	3:58
13.	"Dreamin'" (performed by Jill Scott)	Michael Angelo; Vidal Davis (co.)	4:05
14.	"Somethin' About Love" (performed by Imajin)	Timmy Allen	4:20
15.	"Quiet Storm (Remix)" (performed by Mobb Deep & Lil' Kim)	Havoc	4:04
Total length:			1:01:04

== Charts ==
Chart (1999)	Peak position
US Billboard 200	28
US Top R&B/Hip-Hop Albums (Billboard)	8
