= Ghetto Qur'an (Forgive Me) =

Song by 50 Cent

from the album Power of the Dollar
- Recorded: 1999
- Genre: Hardcore hip hop; gangsta rap; East Coast hip hop
- Length: 4:35
- Label: Trackmasters/Columbia/Sony
- Songwriter: C. Jackson
- Producer: Trackmasters

"Ghetto Qur'an (Forgive Me)" is a song by American rapper 50 Cent from his unreleased Columbia Records debut album Power of the Dollar. The song was leaked in early 2000. The song mentions drug dealers from the 1980s in his neighborhood of South Jamaica, Queens. In 2023, a writer for Vibe Magazine labeled the song "among the most controversial records ever laid on wax". In 2026, the song was featured during the end credits of the finale of Power Book III: Raising Kanan.

As with most of the album the song was produced by Poke & Tone of Trackmasters, who used a sample from Diana Ross' and Marvin Gaye's duet "Stop, Look, Listen (To Your Heart)". The name of the song is a reference to the Islamic holy book, the Quran.

== Lyrics ==
The track's lyrics mention several characters 50 remembers from his formative years in Queens, including Kenneth McGriff and his nephew Gerald Prince Miller of the '80s drug gang Supreme Team.

== Aftermath ==
It was rumored that the song and the subsequent music industry blacklisting of 50 Cent by Kenneth "Supreme" McGriff and his associates led to the murder of Run DMC's Jam Master Jay. There is speculation that Jay ignored the blacklisting by mentoring the young 50 Cent and introducing him to the people in the music industry. According to an affidavit by IRS agent Francis Mace, law enforcement officials believed that the shooting of 50 Cent in 2000 was in retaliation for the lyrics of the song which detailed the history of The Supreme Team. While this avenue was investigated, ultimately, Jay's murder was linked to an unrelated cocaine trafficking consignment which had gone wrong (to which arrests were made in 2020).

"Ghetto Qur'an" served as a basis for 50 Cent's rivals (mainly Ja Rule, Irv Gotti and the Murder Inc. music group, with whom he was feuding at the time) labeling him a snitch. 50 Cent mentioned in an AllHipHop.com interview that the song was appreciated. He also talked about how Nas' song "Get Down" from the album God's Son similarly mentions names, but few people consider anything wrong with it.

The song was later added to his 2002 mixtape Guess Who's Back?, titled as "Ghetto Qua ran".

The chorus to this song was sampled on Proof's solo CD Searching for Jerry Garcia on the song called "Forgive Me".
