= Power of the Dollar =

EP and studio album by 50 Cent

EP by 50 Cent
- Released: September 12, 2000
- Recorded: 1998–2000
- Studios: Bearsville Studios, Bearsville, New York
- Genres: East Coast hip-hop; gangsta rap; underground hip-hop
- Length: 19:06
- Labels: Trackmasters; Columbia
- Producers: 50 Cent; Cory Rooney; Trackmasters; Al West; Brian Kierulf; DJ Scratch; Erick Sermon

50 Cent chronology
Power of the Dollar (2000)	Guess Who's Back? (2002)

Singles from Power of the Dollar
- 1. "How to Rob" Released: August 10, 1999; 2. "Thug Love" Released: September 21, 1999; 3. "Your Life's on the Line" Released: October 12, 1999

Power of the Dollar is the debut EP by American rapper 50 Cent. It was released September 12, 2000, by Columbia Records and Trackmasters Entertainment. A longer version of the EP was originally set to be released as 50 Cent's debut studio album on July 4, 2000, but he was ultimately dropped by Columbia after an incident where he was shot repeatedly, and the album was shelved. Subsequently, the album was heavily bootlegged. Since then, Columbia has stated it has no plans to release the full album.

The EP features guest appearances from Destiny's Child, Noreaga, and the Madd Rapper. The album version was set to feature all the artists included on the EP as well as Bun B and Dave Hollister. The album's production was handled by Trackmasters, Red Spyda, Sha Self, DJ Scratch and Erick Sermon, among other producers and was leaked on YouTube in 2012.

== Reception ==
Professional ratings
Review scores
Source	Rating
AllMusic	3/5 stars
The Source	3.5/5 stars

AllMusic wrote that the tracks utilize "penetrating wit and funk-infused beats, accompanied by grand orchestrations of commanding horns, pronounced percussion, and various string elements".

== Singles ==
The EP's lead single, "How to Rob", was released on August 10, 1999, and was also included on the Power of the Dollar EP and the soundtrack to the film In Too Deep. The single attracted significant controversy due to its content, which was him comically telling how he would rob several high-profile hip-hop & R&B artists.

The second single, "Thug Love" featuring Destiny's Child, was released on September 21, 1999, and was also featured on the EP release. Days before 50 Cent was scheduled to film its music video, he was attacked by a gunman in the infamous shooting incident that left him with nine gunshot wounds and gave him his dimple scar; an event that 50 Cent often references in his lyrics. While hospitalized, he signed a publishing deal with Columbia Records; however, he was dropped from the label after it was discovered that he had been shot. The track, "Ghetto Qur'an (Forgive Me)", has been speculated to be the reason for the shooting.

The third and final single, "Your Life's on the Line", was released in 1999. The song was produced by Terrence Dudley, and was perceived as a diss song to Ja Rule, which would begin their highly publicized feud on records. 50 mocks Ja Rule's catchphrase "Murdaa!", on the chorus of the song, rapping "Murdaa, I don't believe you/Murdaa, Fuck around and leave you/Murdaa, I don't believe you/Murda Murda, your life's on the line". A music video for the song was shot on the streets of New York in 1998. The song was included on the Power of the Dollar EP, and would later be included on both 50 Cent's debut mixtape, Guess Who's Back?, and his 2003 album, Get Rich or Die Tryin', as a bonus track.

== Songs officially released ==
Of the 19 songs featured on both the EP and album versions of Power of the Dollar, 9 have been officially released.

- "Thug Love" (feat. Destiny's Child) was released as a single and was featured on Power of the Dollar EP
- "I'm a Hustler" was featured on Power of the Dollar EP
- "Da Heatwave" (feat. Noreaga) was featured on the Power of the Dollar EP and was not set to feature on the album
- "Your Life's on the Line" was released as a single and was featured on Power of the Dollar EP, Guess Who's Back?, and as a bonus track on Get Rich or Die Tryin'
- "How to Rob" (feat. The Madd Rapper) was released as a single and was featured on Power of the Dollar EP, In Too Deep, and Best of 50 Cent
- "The Good Die Young" was featured on the B-side of the "Your Life's on the Line" single
- "Corner Bodega" was featured on Guess Who's Back?
- '"As the World Turns'" was featured on Guess Who's Back?
- "Ghetto Qur'an (Forgive Me)" was featured on Guess Who's Back?

== Track listing ==
Unreleased LP
No.	Title	Writer(s)	Producer(s)	Length
1.	"Intro"			1:11
2.	"The Hit"		Randy Allen	3:41
3.	"The Good Die Young"		Al West	4:02
4.	"Corner Bodega (Coke Spot)"		L.E.S.	1:36
5.	"Your Life's on the Line"	Jackson; Terence Dudley	Terence Dudley	3:38
6.	"That Ain't Gangsta"		Trackmasters	3:25
7.	"As the World Turns" (featuring Bun B)	Ron Francois	Red Spyda	4:20
8.	"Ghetto Qur'an (Forgive Me)"	Jackson	Trackmasters	4:34
9.	"Da Repercussions"		Kurt Gowdy	3:28
10.	"Money by Any Means" (featuring Noreaga)		Trackmasters; Teflon	4:03
11.	"Material Girl" (featuring Dave Hollister)		Trackmasters	4:35
12.	"Thug Love" (featuring Destiny's Child)	Jackson; Rashad Smith; Joshua Michael Schwartz; Brian Kierulf; Nycolia "Tye-V" Turman	Rashad Smith; Joshua Michael Schwartz; Brian Kierulf	3:16
13.	"Slow Doe"		Trackmasters	3:54
14.	"Gun Runner"	Jackson	Trackmasters	1:55
15.	"You Ain't No Gangsta"	Jackson; Clervoix	Sha Self	3:37
16.	"Power of the Dollar"		Trackmasters	3:26
17.	"I'm a Hustler"	Jackson; George Spivey; C. Elliot; Rufus Blaq; K. Kiss	DJ Scratch	3:55
18.	"How to Rob" (featuring the Madd Rapper)	Jackson; Jean-Claude Olivier; Samuel Barnes; Deric Angelettie; Harry Wayne Casey; Richard Finch	Trackmasters	4:25
Total length:				63:01

Released EP
No.	Title	Writer(s)	Producer(s)	Length
1.	"Thug Love" (featuring Destiny's Child)	Curtis Jackson; Rashad Smith; Joshua Michael Schwartz; Brian Kierulf; Nycolia "Tye-V" Turman	Rashad Smith; Joshua Michael Schwartz; Brian Kierulf	3:16
2.	"I'm a Hustler"	Jackson; George Spivey; C. Elliot; Rufus Blaq; K. Kiss	DJ Scratch	3:46
3.	"Da Heatwave" (featuring Noreaga)	Jackson; Erick Sermon	Erick Sermon	3:56
4.	"Your Life's on the Line"	Jackson; Terence Dudley	Terence Dudley	3:44
5.	"How to Rob" (featuring the Madd Rapper)	Jackson; Jean-Claude Olivier; Samuel Barnes; Deric Angelettie; Harry Wayne Casey; Richard Finch	Trackmasters	4:24
Total length:				19:06
