= Thug Love (song) =

Single by 50 Cent featuring Destiny's Child

from the album Power of the Dollar
- Released: September 21, 1999
- Recorded: 1999
- Studio: The Hit Factory (New York, NY)
- Genre: East Coast hip hop; gangsta hip hop; hardcore hip hop
- Length: 3:16
- Label: Columbia
- Songwriters: Curtis Jackson; Rashad Smith; Joshua Michael Schwartz; Brian Kierulf; Nycolia "Tye-V" Turman
- Producers: Smith; Schwartz; Kierulf (co.)

50 Cent singles chronology
"Rowdy Rowdy" (1999)	"Thug Love" (1999)	"Your Life's on the Line" (1999)

Destiny's Child singles chronology
"Bug a Boo" (1999)	"Thug Love" (1999)	"Say My Name" (1999)

"Thug Love" is a song recorded by American rapper 50 Cent released on September 21, 1999, for his debut studio album Power of the Dollar (2000). The song was written by 50 Cent himself, alongside Rashad Smith, Joshua Michael Schwartz, Brian Kierulf and Nycolia "Tye-V" Turman and was produced by Smith with co-production from Schwartz and Kierulf. The song features guest vocals from American girl group Destiny's Child. A music video was to be filmed to accompany the song, but was cancelled when 50 Cent was shot nine times just three days before the video was scheduled to be filmed.

== Track listing ==
=== A-side ===
1. "Thug Love" (Explicit Album Version)
2. "Thug Love" (Clean Album Version)

=== B-side ===
1. "Thug Love" (Instrumental)
2. "Thug Love" (Explicit A Cappella)
