= In Too Deep (1999 film) =

1999 film directed by Michael Rymer

- Theatrical release poster
- Directed by: Michael Rymer
- Written by: Michael Henry Brown; Paul Aaron
- Produced by: Paul Aaron; Michael Henry Brown
- Starring: Omar Epps; LL Cool J; Nia Long; Stanley Tucci; Hill Harper; Pam Grier
- Cinematography: Ellery Ryan
- Edited by: Dany Cooper
- Music by: Christopher Young
- Production company: Dimension Films
- Distributed by: Miramax Films
- Release date: August 25, 1999
- Running time: 104 minutes
- Country: United States
- Language: English
- Budget: $7 million
- Box office: $14 million

In Too Deep is a 1999 American crime thriller film directed by Michael Rymer from a screenplay written by Michael Henry Brown and Paul Aaron. The film stars Omar Epps, LL Cool J, Nia Long, Stanley Tucci, Hill Harper and Pam Grier. The film follows Jeffrey Cole, a detective who goes deep undercover on a mission to catch a brutal crime boss who is responsible for the majority of the crimes in the city.

== Plot ==
Jeffrey Cole is a recent graduate of the Cincinnati police academy who dreams of working undercover. Cole manages to get an undercover assignment the day of graduation and earns the praise of his superiors. He is soon given the task of taking down statewide crack dealer Dwayne Gittens, an underworld boss so powerful that his nickname is "God".

Cole goes undercover, posing as a drug dealer under the name of J. Reid from Akron, Ohio. Cole has to prove he has street cred to gain a place in God's crew. At one point God sends Cole out on a mission with a couple of his cohorts with the intention of Cole killing a man that God wants dead. Cole chases the target but intentionally misses his shots.

The crew believe he's loyal, but has bad aim. Cole eventually becomes close with one of the members of Gittens' crew, Breezy T..

Cole's superiors are impressed at his undercover work and how close he has gotten to Gittens, earning his trust while providing his superiors with intricate details into the organization. Cole's superior, Preston D'Ambrosio worries that the line between cop and bad guy is getting blurred and that both identities are becoming one. D'Ambrosio places Cole on forced hiatus from undercover and sends him to a place in the woods far from the city to get his head straight and re-discover himself.

During that time, Cole meets Myra, an aspiring model during one of Cole's photography classes. The two eventually begin dating and D'Ambrosio begins to take notice of his new life away from undercover work. Cole tries to convince D'Ambrosio to let him go back undercover in the Gittens case, to no avail.

D'Ambrosio is eventually overruled by District Attorney Daniel Connelly and DEA agent Rick Scott, reasoning that Cole is the only undercover cop to infiltrate Gittens crew as deep as he has, and Cole is the person who can bring down Gittens' organization. Cole is then reassigned to the Gittens case. Myra, realizing that he has to go back undercover and worried for his safety, begins to distance herself from Cole.

Cole starts to see Gittens becoming unhinged and his sporadic violence in the community, going as far as torturing, sodomizing, dismembering then later killing his second in command for making a pass at his baby's mother. The ruthlessness starts to get to Cole, as he dives deeper into his J. Reid cover.

D'Ambrosio wants to pull Cole out of undercover again, as he sees his officer becoming unhinged and becoming J. Reid. Connelly and Scott disagree, and they come up with a sting to bust Gittens meeting with his suppliers. A gunfight ensues when police arrive to arrest Gittens and the suppliers. Gittens advises his crew to lower their weapons and surrender.

Cole shields Gittens from police and a standoff ensues between the officers and an unhinged Cole, struggling between his loyalties. Realizing he is losing himself, Det. Angela Wilson talks him down and reminds him that he is Jeffrey Cole, not J. Reid, and to lower his weapon.

As Gittens is being read his Miranda rights, Scott requests Cole to bring Gittens in. During trial, Cole testifies against Gittens and his organization. Cole puts in a good word for Breezy T., helping him reduce his sentence. Because of the evidence against him and Cole's testimony, Gittens is convicted and sentenced. Gittens and Cole share a final glance before Gittens is taken away.

As Connelly and Scott hold a press conference for the conviction of Gittens, Cole and Myra are driving and listening to the press conference. Cole switches off the radio, while Myra reminds Cole that his undercover work was the sole reason Gittens is behind bars. The last scenes are shown where Cole is teaching new young officers about undercover work, and the importance to never lose their cover or get too deep.

== Cast ==
- Omar Epps as Detective Jeffrey "J. Reid" Cole
- LL Cool J as Dwayne Keith "God" Gittens
- Nia Long as Myra
- Stanley Tucci as Preston D'Ambrosio
- Hill Harper as "Breezy T"
- Pam Grier as Detective Angela Wilson
- Jake Weber as Daniel Connelly
- Richard Brooks as Wesley
- David Patrick Kelly as Rick Scott
- Veronica Webb as Pam
- Ron Canada as Dr. Bratton
- Robert LaSardo as Felipe Batista
- Gano Grills as Frisco
- Ivonne Coll as Mrs. Batista
- Don Harvey as Murphy
- Jermaine Dupri as Melvin
- Lloyd Adams as Ray "Ray-Ray"
- Philip Akin as Minister
- Anna Carolina Alvim as Esperanza Batista
- Karina Arroyave as "G.G."
- Chris Collins as "Lookout"
- Guillermo Díaz as Miguel Batista
- Aunjanue Ellis as Denise
- Sticky Fingaz as "Ozzie"
- Avery Waddell as "Gash"
- Michie Mee as Martha (credited as Michi Mi)
- Mýa as Loretta
- Shyheim as "Che"
- Nas as Unnamed Drug Dealer
- Hassan Johnson as Latique

== Production ==
The film is based on a true story of Darryl "God" Whiting and Boston Housing Officer Jeff Coy. Coy died by suicide 3 years after the case. Whiting was found guilty and sentenced to life without the possibility of parole and 240 years to run concurrent. He later died in prison on August 1, 2026 at the age of 71.

In Too Deep was filmed from November 2 to December 18, 1998.

== Reception ==
The movie received mixed reviews.

On the review aggregator website Rotten Tomatoes, 39% of 57 critics' reviews are positive. The website's consensus reads: "This shallow police film doesn't establish any kind of rhythm." Metacritic, which uses a weighted average, assigned the film a score of 53 out of 100, based on 28 critics, indicating "mixed or average" reviews.

In an interview, LL Cool J singled out In Too Deep as his favorite acting performance: “Playing the villain. Just being able to let loose and put guns in people’s mouths and put ’em on pool tables and torture ’em and all that. Like, that was right up my alley. I loved everything about it, man. It was loose, it was street, it was ghetto. It was enjoyable playing a completely different person.“

=== Box office ===
The movie recouped its budget at the box office making 14 million from its 7 million budget.

== Soundtrack ==
A soundtrack containing hip hop music was released on August 24, 1999, by Columbia Records. It made it to No. 28 on the Billboard 200 and No. 8 on the Top R&B/Hip-Hop Albums and featured 50 Cent's debut single, "How to Rob".

== Score ==
Varèse Sarabande issued an album of Christopher Young's score for the film on September 21, 1999. Young was very displeased with the album.

=== Track listing ===
No.	Title	Length
1.	"In Too Deep"	3:10
2.	"Cool J"	2:15
3.	"Slam Guru"	3:27
4.	"Hair Wind Child"	3:56
5.	"Thank Not"	1:53
6.	"Wild Life"	1:51
7.	"Suite 201"	2:50
8.	"Bust"	2:29
9.	"God's Alive (Inside a Movie)"	2:30
10.	"Ant Heel Blues"	2:58
11.	"Tank Trips"	1:38
12.	"Jay Ball Sweat"	2:55
13.	"Frisco In the Trash"	2:34
14.	"Missing Vocal"	3:11
Total length:		37:37

In 2008, Christopher Young personally rearranged the score into a promotional album that he produced. The album contains the song "Give me a reason" performed by Dave Hollister. About the final product, Young said: "Thanks for giving it another shot. At long last I think I can finally live with this score".

=== Track listing ===
No.	Title	Length
1.	"Give Me a Reason"	4:13
2.	"Tank Trips 2"	4:09
3.	"Simple Sister"	7:01
4.	"Give Me a Reason (reprise)"	4:57
5.	"In Too Deep"	3:11
6.	"Frisco Back in the Trash"	4:48
7.	"Thank Not You"	3:41
8.	"Give Me a Reason (song CD version)"	3:57
Total length:		35:57

== See also ==
- List of hood films
