= How to Rob =

- Cover for the single released from the In Too Deep film soundtrack

Single by 50 Cent and The Madd Rapper

from the album Power of the Dollar, In Too Deep: Music from the Dimension Motion Picture, Tell Em Why You Madd and Best of 50 Cent
- Released: August 10, 1999
- Recorded: 1999
- Genre: Gangsta rap; comedy hip-hop
- Length: 4:25
- Label: Columbia
- Songwriters: Angelettie; Barnes; Casey; Jackson; Olivier
- Producer: The Trackmasters

50 Cent and The Madd Rapper singles chronology
"React" (1998)	"How to Rob" (1999)	"Rowdy Rowdy" (1999)

Audio sample
- file; help

"How to Rob" is a song by American hip hop recording artists 50 Cent and Deric "D-Dot" Angelettie, released in August 1999 as the former's commercial debut single by Columbia Records. The song was intended as the lead single from the 50 Cent's debut studio album Power of the Dollar, which was ultimately shelved by the label due to controversies surrounding the artist. Following this, it was instead released in promotion for the soundtrack to the 1999 film In Too Deep. The latter performer, credited as "the Madd Rapper", included the song as the final track on his debut album, Tell Em Why You Madd (2000). The song was also included on 50 Cent's 2017 greatest hits album, Best of 50 Cent. It was produced by affiliates and then-labelmates of both performers, Trackmasters.

== Background ==
The song features statements in quick succession about robbing and mugging numerous prominent figures in the urban music scene. After giving "R.I.P." shout-outs to The Notorious B.I.G. and Tupac Shakur, 50 Cent raps about robbing, in order:

- Kim Porter
- Puff Daddy
- Bobby Brown and Whitney Houston
- Brian McKnight
- Keith Sweat
- Cardan
- Harlem World
- Mase
- Ol' Dirty Bastard
- Foxy Brown and Kurupt
- Jay-Z
- Case
- Trackmasters (mentioned as Tone & Poke)
- Slick Rick
- Stevie J
- Big Pun
- Master P
- Silkk the Shocker
- Will Smith and Jada Pinkett Smith
- Timbaland and Missy Elliott
- Joe
- Jermaine Dupri and Da Brat
- DMX
- Treach
- DJ Clue
- TQ
- Raekwon, Ghostface Killah and RZA
- Sticky Fingaz
- Fredro Starr
- Canibus
- Heavy D
- Juvenile
- Blackstreet
- R. Kelly (though not by name, is referenced within the lyrics)
- Boyz II Men and Michael Bivins
- Mike Tyson and Robin Givens
- Mister Cee
- Busta Rhymes and the Flipmode Squad
- Kirk Franklin.

The song originally also had lyrics against pop and R&B singer Mariah Carey and her ex-husband Tommy Mottola with the lyrics "I'll man handle Mariah like 'Bitch, get on the ground' / You ain't with Tommy no more, who gon' protect you now?". When the song was released, this line was replaced (because Mariah Carey threatened to leave the label if her name remained on the song) with the lyrics "I'll man handle Case like 'Duke, get on the ground' / You ain't with Mary no more, where you gettin' chips from now?", referencing R&B singer Case Woodard and his former girlfriend Mary J. Blige.

The song may have been a tribute to the infamous 1980s gangster Kelvin Martin, whose nickname "50 Cent" inspired 50 Cent's own name. Martin was infamous for robbing celebrities.

Emphasizing the humorous nature of the song, the song's own producers, the Trackmasters, are listed among the intended victims. Sticky Fingaz, who is also mentioned, had collaborated with 50 Cent the year before, as part of the group Onyx, on the song "React" from their 1998 album Shut 'Em Down. Sticky Fingaz also appeared in In Too Deep, which featured "How to Rob" in its soundtrack, as did another artist mentioned, Jermaine Dupri.

Of the other celebrities mentioned in "How to Rob", 50 Cent has worked with Jay-Z, Diddy, Mase, Busta Rhymes, DMX, Missy Elliott, DJ Clue, Juvenile, Joe, Lil' Kim, R. Kelly, and Timbaland since the song's release.

== Reception ==
Roxanne Blandford from AllMusic called "How to Rob" an "uproariously cunning single". Keith Farley of AllMusic also highlighted the song in his review of the In Too Deep soundtrack.

The single created a lot of buzz for 50 Cent's Power of the Dollar album, though it was eventually shelved by Columbia Records.

== Response from artists ==
50 Cent said that he intended the single to be a joke, and not meant to disrespect anybody. Nevertheless, a number of rappers mentioned on the song responded on record. The comments made towards the Wu-Tang Clan were responded to on the Ghostface Killah album Supreme Clientele on a track called "Ghost Deini" and even more directly on a skit called "Clyde Smith" which included one of the Wu-Tang Clan members talking about how they intended to harm the rapper, which is identifiable as Raekwon when the track is sped up. A supposed diss song, "Who the Fuck Is 50 Cent", which circulated the web in the beginning of 2001 was rumored to be by the Clan, but was proven to be recorded by Polite of American Cream Team (Raekwon's then-side project). Jay-Z also reacted to the comments in the track called It's Hot (Some Like It Hot), off the album Vol. 3... Life and Times of S. Carter:

Go against Jigga yo' ass is dense I'm about a dollar, what the fuck is 50 Cents?

In an interview, however, 50 Cent claims that Jay-Z told him he loved the song, and that Jay asked permission to respond before he did.

Sticky Fingaz responded to the diss with the track "Jackin' for Beats."

Big Pun responds to this track in the song "My Turn" from his 2000 album Yeeeah Baby, which was released posthumously. In the song, he states:

And to the 50 Cent Rapper, very funny -- get your nut off, 'cuz in real life, we all know I'd blow your motherfucking head off...If I'm gonna write a song, it'll be about how I had to beat your mothafuckin' ass. And that'll be the name of the motherfucker: 'That's Why I Had To Beat Your Motherfucking Ass', featuring Tony Sunshine.

Kurupt also responded to the track with "Callin Out Names":

Now it's 50 mc's that ain't worth shit Get ya ass kicked 50 times, beat to 10 cent

Missy Elliott however responded in a humorous way, in the liner notes for her 2002 album Under Construction, on which 50 Cent appears:

I don't know you that well except when you told me to put them hot dogs down (haha). I got on the treadmill for you baby. Thanks for the remix! Love ya!

Wyclef Jean referred to the song on "Low Income" from his 2000 album, The Ecleftic:

Low income, I stay so hungry that if 50 Cent came to rob me, he'd be part of my charity.

== Legacy ==
West coast rapper Jay Rock remade the song in 2009 under the title "How to Rob '09". Maryland-based rapper Bandhunta Izzy, recorded a song titled “How to Rob” in 2019, which features vocals from the Madd Rapper, who appeared on 50 Cent’s original version of the song. Trinidadian rapper Nicki Minaj interpolated the song in 2018 under the name "Barbie Dreams".

== Track listing ==
=== A-side ===
1. "How to Rob" (Explicit Album Version)
2. "How to Rob" (Clean Album Version)

=== B-side ===
1. "Rowdy Rowdy" (Explicit Album Version)
2. "Rowdy Rowdy" (Clean Album Version)

== Charts ==
Chart (1999)	Peak position
US Hot R&B/Hip-Hop Songs (Billboard)	62
US Hot Rap Songs (Billboard)	24
