= Trackmasters =

American hip hop production duo

- Also known as: Poke & Tone
- Origin: Brooklyn, New York City, U.S.
- Genres: Hip hop; hip-hop soul; R&B
- Occupations: Record producers; songwriters
- Years active: 1989–present
- Labels: Trackmasters Entertainment; Columbia; Universal
- Members: Poke (Jean-Claude Olivier); Tone (Samuel Barnes)
- Past members: Frank "Nitty" Pimentel; Alexander Richbourg

The Trackmasters, also known as Poke & Tone, is an American hip hop production outfit composed of Poke (Jean-Claude Olivier born January 21, 1970; Brooklyn, New York ) and Tone (Samuel Barnes born January 20, 1969; Brooklyn, New York). First active from the late 1980s to the mid 2000s, the group was more often known as a duo, Poke & Tone. Throughout their career, they have been credited on albums and singles for hip hop and R&B artists including Destiny's Child, Nas, R. Kelly, LL Cool J, Mary J. Blige, Will Smith, Jay-Z, Cam'ron, Jennifer Lopez, Mariah Carey, The Notorious B.I.G. and 50 Cent.

Known for their commercially successful singles and remixes, they have collectively earned over seven gold and 20 platinum certifications by the Recording Industry Association of America. They were ranked 6th in Vibe magazine's "Greatest Hip-Hop Producers of All Time" in the 'Mass Appeal' category.

== History ==
=== 1989−1995: Early career ===
In 1989, Poke connected with childhood friend Frank "Nitty" Pimentel at his recording studio in Bay Ridge, Brooklyn, New York City. With Tone (known then as Red Hot Lover Tone), Pimentel helped Tone and Poke learn the equipment, as well as programming and sequencing on drum machines. Alex Richbourg joined the team that same year as a musician. A few years later, Alex Richbourg decided to move on and join forces with Jimmy Jam and Terry Lewis. Soon after, Alex "Spanador" Mosely from the group Lisa Lisa and Cult Jam added the acoustic guitar and many other live instruments. The name Trackmasters originated from their first manager, Andre S. Brownne. The original name was stylized as TrakMasterz; however, in the mid 1990s, it was changed and restructured by their new manager, Steve Stoute, to what it is today.

Puff Daddy had become an A&R at Uptown Records, and when he met up with the Trackmasters, it was rumored that he bought every beat they had made. Trackmasters were signed to Columbia Records and were given their own imprint/vanity label Trackmasters Entertainment after producing for artists such as Kool G Rap, LL Cool J, Roxanne Shante and Big Daddy Kane. At the time, they were working with MC Serch of rap group 3rd Bass, and Tone also had a side project on Select Records as a rapper under the name Red Hot Lover Tone.

Around this time, Poke had also worked with Puff Daddy to produce the hit singles "Juicy" and "Respect" for The Notorious B.I.G.'s debut album, and "Be Happy" for Mary J. Blige, as well as producing for other artists including Heavy D, Soul for Real, Method Man and Faith Evans.

=== 1995−2000: Commercial success and Trackmasters label ===
In 1995, Trackmasters produced two major hits for LL Cool J from his Mr. Smith album: "Hey Lover" and "Loungin". The album is also notable for Foxy Brown's musical debut on the single "I Shot Ya (remix)". "Hey Lover" featuring Boyz II Men reached #3 on both the Billboard Hot 100 and Hot R&B Singles charts and was certified platinum. The remix of "Loungin" became known by many as the quintessential version. The remix which features R&B group Total peaked at #3 on the Billboard Hot 100. With their production signature in layering variety mix sounds of boom-bap-style drums and recognizable R&B samples; Trackmasters enjoyed mainstream success producing well acclaimed commercial hits in the mid-1990s through early 2000s

In 1996, Nas released his second album It Was Written featuring Poke & Tone as main producers. Although it was criticized for having a more mainstream or commercialized sound, it was highly successful, topping the Billboard 200 chart for a month straight and is Nas' best selling album to date. The two singles "Street Dreams" and "If I Ruled the World (Imagine That)" also helped the Trackmasters establish their position as prominent hip hop producers of that era. They also were heavily involved with Foxy Brown's debut album "Ill Na Na", producing the majority of the album including the hit singles "Get Me Home" featuring Blackstreet and "I'll Be" which also featured Jay-Z.

Capitalizing on recent success and taking advice from manager Steve Stoute, Trackmasters and Nas created hip-hop supergroup The Firm which also included Foxy Brown, AZ and Nature. Teaming up with Dr. Dre, the group released their debut album on Aftermath Recordings with production shared between Trackmasters and Dre. However, the group disbanded after just one album and continued solo careers.

Towards the late 1990s, a new commercial sound had emerged in the hip-hop scene. Sometimes referred to as the "Jiggy Era" or "Shiny Suit Era", it was characterized by upbeat instrumentals which featured samples of many recognizable 1980s hits. The Trackmasters were in high demand from many record labels for their ability to create radio-friendly records which were not deemed to be "selling out", and around this time they produced singles such as Will Smith's "Miami" and "Men in Black", Jay-Z's "Wishing on a Star", R. Kelly's "Did You Ever Think", and the Trackmasters Remix to Ricky Martin's "Livin' la Vida Loca" which featured Big Pun and Fat Joe.

By 1998, their success led to Sony Music's subsidiary label Columbia Records granting Trackmasters their own imprint label, which was named after the group. Following its inception, Trackmasters signed Nature to their imprint as a solo artist following the dissolution of The Firm.

=== 2000−2005: Columbia Records, discovery of 50 Cent, and decline ===
In 2000, Trackmasters signed upcoming rapper 50 Cent to their Trackmasters imprint at Sony/Columbia Records and had produced the majority of what would have been his debut album Power of the Dollar, which included the controversial singles "Ghetto Qu'ran (Forgive Me)" and "How to Rob". However, three days before the filming of the video for "Thug Love", which also featured Destiny's Child, 50 Cent was shot nine times near his home in New York. Columbia Records forced Trackmasters to drop 50 Cent from their label due to bad publicity surrounding the shooting, and as a result the album was shelved leading to a falling out between 50 and Poke & Tone.

In 2001, the Trackmasters Remix to Jennifer Lopez's "I'm Gonna Be Alright", which featured a then relatively unknown 50 Cent, was to be released as a single. However, Lopez and Epic Records decided they would rather have Nas feature on the song due to his popularity on the music charts at the time, so a new version was recorded and the 50 Cent verses were scrapped. This caused further tension between 50 and Trackmasters, and also lead to a rift between then-friends, 50 Cent and Nas. The version of the Remix which features 50 Cent can be heard online as it was leaked to radio before the official release.

Despite being unable to break new artist 50 Cent to the mainstream, Poke & Tone continued to produce hits for established artists including LL Cool J's "Paradise", Michael Jackson's "You Rock My World [Trackmasters Remix]", "Fiesta" by R. Kelly and Jay-Z, and Jennifer Lopez's R&B number 1 single "Jenny from the Block".

Also in 2001, Tone produced two hit singles for slain rapper 2Pac. Tone's remixed versions of "Until The End Of Time" & "Letter 2 My Unborn" were big contributors to making 2Pac's album sell more than three million copies.

In 2002, Trackmasters worked on The Best of Both Worlds, a collaboration album between Jay-Z and R. Kelly where they produced 10 of 13 songs and where Tone was credited as executive producer. This was followed up in 2004 by another collaboration album between the two called Unfinished Business, where again the duo handled the majority of the production. However, both albums were met with poor commercial and critical success, and as mainstream production was being handled by producers who relied less on samples and had a more synth-based keyboard sound such as The Neptunes, the Trackmasters sound became less popular. In 2005, they produced the track "Dunn Natt" (Done That) with Vanilla Ice.

Although they did produce some new music around the time, for example Rihanna's "If It's Lovin' That You Want" (the second single of her debut album), Trackmasters were not highly regarded as the sought after producers they once were.

=== 2005−present: Reformation ===
After 2005, beats by the Trackmasters were heard less in mainstream hip-hop and R&B, and Poke and Tone had disbanded and taken on new jobs; Poke as a television producer and Tone as the Executive Vice President of A&R at Universal Music Group.

However, in 2007 the two joined together again and recruited more musicians and producers including Russell "The ARE" Gonzales, Spanador, Frequency, Ace 21 and Just Nyce to reform Trackmasters from a duo to a full production team with songwriters and musicians, with Poke and Tone overseeing each project. The reformed group reportedly spent three months working at Battery Studios, leaving with over 230 completed songs ready to be sold.

They recorded songs with Lil' Kim for her 2010 album including the songs "Shook Hands", and "Download" featuring T-Pain and Charlie Wilson.

Since the group reformed, they have produced on Ray J's 2008 album All I Feel on the song "Boyfriend", and on Ludacris' 2008 album Theater of the Mind with the single "One More Drink" featuring T-Pain. They also worked on rapper The Game's 2008 album LAX however, the song "Ain't Fuckin' With You" which they produced was only featured on the Deluxe Edition as a bonus track. The team also worked on various tracks from Wiz Khalifa's 2009 album Deal or No Deal, including the single "This Plane" and the 2011 track "Motivated (Tired of Playing Games)" by Harlem rapper Vado.

== Production style ==
The style of production which gained the Trackmasters the most recognition was a mix of the traditional heavy hitting "boom-bap" style drums generally found in older hip-hop music, with a more modern influence involving the use of recognizable samples (often from 1980s pop hits), giving the overall track a commercial, polished feel yet still retaining the traditional hip-hop sound. This style can be found in songs such as "I'll Be" by Foxy Brown and Jay-Z, "Street Dreams" by Nas, "Just Crusin'" by Will Smith and "The Roof (Remix)" by Mariah Carey and Mobb Deep.

Also, layering different sounds has been a key technique used by the duo. It has been noted that Poke's version of "Juicy" has a layered bassline over the sample, giving more rhythm and making it easier to dance to, as opposed to Pete Rock's version which relies more on the heavy drums, giving a "boom-bap" sound.

As the mainstream trending sound started to change in the early 2000s, the Trackmasters adopted new techniques into their production style. They characterised their newer beats with the use of a Spanish guitar sound used in beats such as R. Kelly and Jay-Z's "Fiesta", "Pretty Girls" and "Get This Money", and also Nas' "Money Is My Bitch". Additionally, they experimented with different percussion sounds as shown on Fabolous' "Damn", and frequently incorporated turntable scratches at the end of every 8 bars on beats including Jennifer Lopez's "Im Gonna Be Alright (Trackmasters Remix)", and "Jenny From the Block".

Since Trackmasters expanded to a full production team, Tone emphasises the importance of layering instruments over samples to create a more full beat. "The key to big-sounding records is layering. If you can layer a sample with live instruments, you're taking your track to a level that, sonically, is going to surpass what most hip-hop producers are doing." This technique has been used on the song "Boyfriend" by Ray J with the piano sounds.

== Discography ==
Albums

- Trackmasters Remixes (2008)
