= The Benzino Project =

Studio album by Benzino
- Released: October 30, 2001
- Recorded: 2000–2001
- Studio: Daddy's Home (New York, NY); Source Sound Lab; Future Recording Studios (Virginia Beach, VA); Audio Vision Recording Studio (Miami, FL); The Hit Factory (New York, NY); Bogart Studio (Miami, FL); Hit Factory (Miami, FL)
- Genre: Hip hop
- Length: 1:03:32
- Label: Motown, ZNO Records
- Producer: Benzino (exec.); Kedar Massenburg (exec.); Deric "D-Dot" Angelettie; Hangmen 3; P. Diddy; Teddy Riley; Trackmasters

Benzino chronology
Classic Limited Edition (1999)	The Benzino Project (2001)	The Benzino Remix Project (2002)

Singles from The Benzino Project
- 1. "Boottee" Released: August 21, 2001

Professional ratings
Review scores
Source	Rating
AllMusic	3.5/5 stars
RapReviews	6.5/10

The Benzino Project is the debut solo studio album by American rapper Benzino. It was released on October 30, 2001 through Motown and ZNO Records. Recording sessions took place at Daddy's Home and at The Hit Factory in New York, at Source Sound Lab, at Future Recording Studios in Virginia Beach, at Audio Vision Recording Studio, Hit Factory and Bogart Studio in Miami. Produced primarily by Benzino's production team Hangmen 3, as well as Teddy Riley, Deric "D-Dot" Angelettie, Sean "P. Diddy" Combs and Trackmasters, it features guest appearances from Bobby Brown, Black Rob, Cormega, Foxy Brown, Outlawz, Pink, Prodigy, P. Diddy, Raekwon, Ray Ray, Scarface, Snoop Dogg, Superb, and Made Men. The album peaked at number 84 on the Billboard 200 and number 24 on the Top R&B/Hip-Hop Albums. Its lead single, "Boottee", made it to #11 on the Hot Rap Songs.

In 2002, Benzino released a remix version of the album called The Benzino Remix Project.

== Track listing ==
No.	Title	Writer(s)	Producer	Length
1.	"617 Intro"	Raymond Scott; Jeffrey Backues Neal; Bernard Edwards		1:32
2.	"Who Is Benzino?" (featuring P. Diddy)	Scott; Sean Combs; Deric Angelettie; Mario Winans; Jamahl Rashid Rye; Kenneth Andre Cunningham	Sean "P. Diddy" Combs; Deric "D-Dot" Angelettie	4:11
3.	"Bang ta Dis"	Scott; Neal; John Bynoe	Hangmen 3	2:58
4.	"Feel Your Pain" (featuring Outlawz)	Scott; Mutah Beale; Rufus Cooper; Katari Cox; Malcolm Greenridge; Neal; Bynoe	Hangmen 3	3:49
5.	"We Reppin Ya'll" (featuring Made Men)	Scott; Anthony Grant; Marco Ennis; Neal; Bynoe	Hangmen 3	3:22
6.	"Halfway" (Skit)	Scott; Grant; Ennis; Neal; Bynoe	Hangmen 3	2:03
7.	"Figadoh" (featuring Scarface and Snoop Dogg)	Scott; Brad Jordan; Calvin Broadus; Edward Theodore Riley	Teddy Riley	3:46
8.	"Got No Weed" (Skit)	Scott; Neal		1:29
9.	"Nobody Liver" (featuring P!nk)	Scott; Alecia Beth Moore; Neal; Bynoe	Hangmen 3	2:45
10.	"Phone" (Skit)	Scott; Neal		1:45
11.	"Picture This" (featuring Foxy Brown)	Scott; Inga Marchand; Jean-Claude Olivier; Samuel Barnes	Trackmasters	2:16
12.	"Any Questions" (featuring Black Rob)	Scott; Robert Ross; Neal; Bynoe; Brett Williams	Hangmen 3	3:47
13.	"No Parts of Us" (featuring Prodigy and Bobby Brown)	Scott; Albert Johnson; Robert Brown; Neal; Bynoe; Harry Wayne Casey; B. Williams; Grant; Nikki	Hangmen 3	3:51
14.	"Road Rage" (Skit)	Scott; Neal		0:32
15.	"Ghetto Child" (featuring Bobby Brown and Mr. Gzus)	Grant; R. Brown; Scott; Neal; Bynoe; Patrice Rushen; Freddie Washington; Sheree Brown; Darin Anthony Little	Hangmen 3	4:45
16.	"JB's Floatin'" (Skit)	Scott; Neal		0:19
17.	"G-A-N-G-S-T-E-R"	Scott; Neal; Bynoe	Hangmen 3	3:23
18.	"Big Trev" (Skit)	Scott; Neal		0:31
19.	"Boottee" (featuring Teddy Riley and Mr. Gzus)	Scott; Riley; James Walter Castor; Johnny L. Pruitt	Teddy Riley	2:55
20.	"The Jump Up" (featuring Raekwon, Cormega and Superb)	Scott; Corey Wood; Cory McKay; Jamel Cummings; Neal; Bynoe	Hangmen 3	2:53
21.	"Shine Like My Son" (featuring Ray Ray and Case)	Scott; Neal; Bynoe; B. Williams; Little; Michael Jones	Hangmen 3	3:56
22.	"I'm Fucked Up" (featuring Mike McNeil)	Scott; Neal	Hangmen 3	1:13
23.	"Nate's Place" (Skit)	Scott; Neal		1:11
24.	"Throw Dem 3's (Boston Niggas)" (featuring K.T., Prince, Smoke, Luv, Weirdo and O.T.)	Scott; S. Williams; L. Lindsey; R. James; A. Mosley; J.K. Lee; J. Prince; Neal; Bynoe	Hangmen 3	4:20
Total length:				1:03:32

Notes

- Track 15 is actually a duet between Bobby Brown and Wiseguys/Made Men member Mr. Gzus; Benzino appears on the track as part of production team Hangmen 3

Sample credits

- Track 13 contains a sample from "You Treat Me Good" written by Harry Wayne Casey
- Track 15 contains a sample from "Settle for My Love" written by Patrice Rushen, Freddie Washington and Sheree Brown and performed by Patrice Rushen
- Track 19 contains samples from "The Bertha Butt Boogie" written by Jimmy Castor and John Pruitt
- Track 21 contains a sample from "Back to Love" written by Michael Jones and performed by Evelyn "Champagne" King

== Charts ==
Chart (2001)	Peak position
US Billboard 200	84
US Top R&B/Hip-Hop Albums (Billboard)	24
