= L.E.S. (music producer) =

- Also known as: DJ L.E.S.; LES
- Born: LeShan Lewis; December 7, 1966 (age 59); Queens, New York City, U.S.
- Origin: Norfolk, Virginia, U.S.
- Genres: Hip hop; R&B
- Occupations: DJ; record producer
- Years active: 1994–present
- Labels: Total Package Productions; Track Masters Entertainment, Inc.

Leshan Lewis (born December 7, 1966), professionally known by his pseudonym L.E.S., is an American DJ and record producer commonly associated with New York rapper Nas, with whom he grew up in the Queensbridge housing project. His first production credit landed on Nas' popular song "Life's a Bitch" from Illmatic album in 1994. The following year saw him producing his first charted single, AZ's "Sugar Hill" from Doe or Die. Since the mid-90's, Lewis has produced songs for hip hop acts such as Shyheim, 50 Cent, Mobb Deep, Royal Flush, LL Cool J, Big Pun, Capone-N-Noreaga, MC Lyte, Flipmode Squad, Rahzel, Benzino, Cassidy and Cormega, Fat Joe, as well as R&B singer Joe, and German rappers Kool Savas and Azad.

Lewis first teamed up with hip hop production duo Poke & Tone for the song "Black Girl Lost" from Nas' second studio album It Was Written in 1996. Collaboratively, they went on to produce several songs for Will Smith's 1997 album Big Willie Style, including number-one single "Gettin' Jiggy wit It" and "Miami", as well as Amil's 2000 single "I Got That" from All Money Is Legal. He joined forces with record producer Cory Rooney twice, working on R&B hits "Bring It All to Me" by Blaque and "I'm Real" by J.Lo, with the latter has also been produced by Troy Oliver.

Until mid-2008, Lewis took part in almost all the musical projects of Nas and his affiliates, including The Firm, Bravehearts and Nas & Ill Will Records Presents QB's Finest, handling production of the singles "Firm Biz", "Nastradamus" and "Just a Moment".

In the 2010s, Lewis and Wyldfyer, with whom he previously collaborated on Nas' Hip Hop Is Dead, produced Jay Rock's song "Trapped in the Hood" from Black Friday mixtape. Together with Chucky Thompson, with whom he united working on Nas' Street's Disciple, Lewis produced a song "Your Loss" from Busta Rhymes' The Return of the Dragon (The Abstract Went on Vacation) mixtape. Lewis and record producer Chemist produced Freeway's song "Kane & Abel" for the rapper's fifth solo studio album Free Will.

In 2014 he starred in documentary film Nas: Time Is Illmatic.

L.E.S. along with DJ Rick Flare co-founded a recording studio named 45th Street Studios located in Norfolk, Virginia.

== Notable productions ==
Year	Song	Artist(s)	Album	Notes
1994	"Life's a Bitch"	Nas, AZ	Illmatic	
1995	"Sugar Hill"	AZ, Miss Jones	Doe or Die	
1995	"Sugar Hill" (Remix)	AZ, Miss Jones	Doe or Die	
1995	"Envy"	Fat Joe	Jealous One's Envy	
1995	"Fat Joe's in Town"	Fat Joe, DJ Doo Wop	Jealous One's Envy	
1995	Sure Ya Right (Remix)	N-Tyce	Sure Ya Right 12"	
1996	"Shaolin Style"	Shyheim	The Lost Generation	
1996	"Shaolin Style" (Remix)	Shyheim	12"	
1996	"Stick Em"	Mother Superia	12"	
1996	"Street Life"	Mobb Deep, ACD	America Is Dying Slowly	
1996	"Black Girl Lost"	Nas, Joel "JoJo" Hailey	It Was Written	prod. w/ Poke & Tone
1996	"Suspect"	Nas	It Was Written	
1997	"Worldwide"	Royal Flush	Ghetto Millionaire	
1997	"Reppin'"	Royal Flush, Michelle Mitchell	Ghetto Millionaire	
1997	"Starsky & Hutch"	LL Cool J, Busta Rhymes	Phenomenon	
1997	"Firm Biz"	The Firm, Dawn Robinson	The Album	
1997	"Gettin' Jiggy wit It"	Will Smith	Big Willie Style	co-producer; prod. by Poke & Tone
1997	"Candy"	Will Smith, Cameo	Big Willie Style	prod. w/ Poke & Tone
1997	"Chasing Forever"	Will Smith	Big Willie Style	co-producer; prod. by Poke & Tone
1997	"Miami"	Will Smith	Big Willie Style	prod. w/ Poke & Tone
1997	"Yes Yes Y'all"	Will Smith, Camp Lo	Big Willie Style	co-producer; prod. by Poke & Tone
1997	"Big Willie Style"	Will Smith, Left Eye	Big Willie Style	prod. w/ Poke & Tone
1998	"How Ya Livin'"	AZ, Nas	Pieces of a Man	
1998	"Just Because"	AZ	Pieces of a Man	
1998	"Glamour Life"	Big Pun, Terror Squad	Capital Punishment	
1998	"The Way We Live"	Noreaga, Chico DeBarge	N.O.R.E.	
1998	"Da Story"	Noreaga, Maze	N.O.R.E.	
1998	"My Time"	MC Lyte	Seven & Seven	
1998	"The Crack Attack"	Fat Joe	Don Cartagena	
1998	"Everything"	Flipmode Squad	The Imperial	
1999	"Bring It All to Me"	Blaque, JC Chasez	Blaque	prod. w/ Cory Rooney
1999	"Favor for a Favor"	Nas, Scarface	I Am...	
1999	"I Want to Talk to You"	Nas	I Am...	prod. w/ Al West
1999	"Life Is What You Make It"	Nas, DMX	I Am...	
1999	"K-I-SS-I-N-G"	Nas	I Am...	prod. w/ Al West
1999	"Undying Love"	Nas	I Am...	
1999	"Suga Sista"	Rahzel, Aaron Hall, The Roots	Make the Music 2000	prod. w/ Rahzel
1999	"Wise Guys for Life"	Made Men	Classic Limited Edition	prod. w/ Poke & Tone
1999	"Classic Limited Edition"	Made Men	Classic Limited Edition	
1999	"Life We Chose"	Nas	Nastradamus	
1999	"Nastradamus"	Nas	Nastradamus	
1999	"Last Words"	Nas, Nashawn	Nastradamus	
1999	"Big Girl"	Nas	Nastradamus	
1999	"New World"	Nas	Nastradamus	
2000	"My Turn"	Big Pun	Yeeeah Baby	co-prod. by Al West
2000	"I Got That"	Amil, Beyoncé	All Money Is Legal	prod. w/ Poke & Tone
2000	"Shit Like This"	Nature	For All Seasons	
2000	Theme of New York	Ali Vegas	Generation Gap	
2000	"Corner Bodega (Coke Spot)"	50 Cent	Power of the Dollar {unreleased}	
2000	"Phonetime"	Capone-N-Noreaga	The Reunion	
2000	"B EZ"	Capone-N-Noreaga, Nas	The Reunion	
2000	"Intro"	Jungle, Wiz	Nas & Ill Will Records Presents QB's Finest	
2000	"Da Bridge 2001"	Nas, Capone, Mobb Deep, Tragedy Khadafi, Nature, MC Shan, Marley Marl, Cormega, Millennium Thug	Nas & Ill Will Records Presents QB's Finest	prod. w/ Nas
2000	"Real Niggas"	Nas, Ruc da Jackal	Nas & Ill Will Records Presents QB's Finest	
2000	"Find Ya Wealth"	Nas	Nas & Ill Will Records Presents QB's Finest	prod. w/ Nas
2000	"Straight Outta Q.B."	Cormega, Jungle, Blaq Poet	Nas & Ill Will Records Presents QB's Finest	co-prod. by Cormega
2000	"Fire"	Nature	Nas & Ill Will Records Presents QB's Finest	
2000	"Street Glory"	Nas, Pop	Nas & Ill Will Records Presents QB's Finest	
2000	"We Break Bread"	Lord Black, Littles, Craig G, Chaos	Nas & Ill Will Records Presents QB's Finest	
2001	"I'm Real"	Jennifer Lopez	J.Lo	prod. w/ Troy Oliver & Cory Rooney
2001	"Cartel"	Cuban Link, Billy Klubz, Raze, Reif Hustle, Buck 50, Korleone, Don Dinero	24K {unreleased}	
2001	"The Flyest"	Nas, AZ	Stillmatic	
2001	"Every Ghetto"	Nas, Pop	Stillmatic	
2002	"Take It Off"	AZ	Aziatic	
2002	"Black Clouds"	Noreaga, Complexion	God's Favorite	co-prod. by K-Yze
2002	"Block Party"	Will Smith	Born to Reign	prod. w/ Herb Middleton,
2002	"U Gotta Love It"	Nas	The Lost Tapes	
2002	"Nothing Lasts Forever"	Nas	The Lost Tapes	
2002	"Blaze a 50"	Nas	The Lost Tapes	prod. w/ Poke & Tone
2003	"Call My Name"	Benzino, Jadakiss	Redemption	
2003	"You Dropped Your Dime"	Joe	And Then...	prod. w/ Neil da Real
2003	"I Wanna"	Bravehearts	Bravehearted	
2003	"What U Hold Down"	Troy S.L.U.G.S., Capone	Troy S.L.U.G.S.	
2004	"A Message to the Feds, Sincerely, We the People"	Nas	Street's Disciple	prod. w/ Chucky Thompson & Salaam Remi
2004	"Disciple"	Nas	Street's Disciple	
2004	"Rest of My Life"	Nas	Street's Disciple	prod. w/ Chucky Thompson, voc. prod. by Salaam Remi
2004	"Just a Moment"	Nas, Quan	Street's Disciple	
2004	"Reason"	Nas, Emily King	Street's Disciple	prod. w/ Chucky Thompson
2004	"Remember the Times"	Nas	Street's Disciple	
2004	"The Makings of a Perfect Bitch"	Nas	Street's Disciple	prod. w/ T. Black & Nut
2004	"Me & You (Dedicated to Destiny)"	Nas	Street's Disciple	prod. w/ Herb Middleton
2005	"What's Really Good"	Benzino, Scarface, Young Hardy	Arch Nemesis	
2005	"Intro"	Kool Savas, Azad	One	
2005	"All 4 One"	Kool Savas, Azad	One	
2005	"Kick It wit You"	Cassidy, Mario	I'm a Hustla	
2005	"What It's Hittin' 4"	B. Rich	Born Rich	
2005	"Born Rich"	B. Rich	Born Rich	prod. w/ Malcom Flythe
2005	"Life We Choose"	B. Rich	Born Rich	
2005	"Birthday"	B. Rich	Born Rich	
2006	"Money Over Bullshit"	Nas	Hip Hop Is Dead	prod. w/ Wyldfyer
2006	"You Can't Kill Me"	Nas	Hip Hop Is Dead	prod. w/ Al West
2006	"Black Republican"	Nas, Jay-Z	Hip Hop Is Dead	prod. w/ Wyldfyer
2006	"Hope"	Nas	Hip Hop Is Dead	prod. w/ Nas & Alexander "Spanador" Mosely
2007	"Somebody Gotta Die"	Nashawn, Jungle	Mass Destruction	prod. w/ Nut
2008	"I Want In"	Bravehearts, Nas	Bravehearted 2	
2008	"Is You Aight"	Bravehearts	Bravehearted 2	
2008	"Itz So Hard"	2Five	The Watcher	
2009	"Girl"	Cormega	Born and Raised	co-prod. by Cormega
2010	"Trapped in the Hood"	Jay Rock	Black Friday	prod. w/ Wyldfyer
2015	"Your Loss"	Busta Rhymes, Mary J. Blige	The Return of the Dragon (The Abstract Went on Vacation)	prod. w/ Chucky Thompson
2016	"Kane & Abel"	Freeway	Free Will	prod. w/ Chemist
