= Until My Death =

Until My Death might refer to one of the following:

- An album from the American rapper Webbie
- An album from the American rapper Quan
