= I Don't Wanna Know =

2004 single by Mario Winans

Single by Mario Winans featuring Enya and P. Diddy

from the album Hurt No More
- B-side: "Pretty Girl Bullsh*t"
- Released: February 17, 2004
- Genre: R&B
- Length: 4:17
- Label: Bad Boy
- Songwriters: Mario Winans; Enya; Nicky Ryan; Roma Ryan; Lo Down; Chauncey Hawkins
- Producer: Mario Winans

Mario Winans singles chronology
"Crush on You" (2003)	"I Don't Wanna Know" (2004)	"Never Really Was" (2004)

P. Diddy singles chronology
"Show Me Your Soul" (2003)	"I Don't Wanna Know" (2004)	"You Don't Want Drama" (2004)

Enya singles chronology
"May It Be" (2002)	"I Don't Wanna Know" (2004)	"You Should Really Know" (2004)

Music video
- "I Don't Wanna Know" on YouTube

"I Don't Wanna Know" is a song by American singer Mario Winans, featuring American rapper P. Diddy and Irish singer Enya. The song is based on a sample of the Fugees' song "Ready or Not", which in turn samples the synthesizer riff from Enya's song "Boadicea". The drums are sampled from the end of EPMD's "You're a Customer", though the writers (Erick Sermon and Parrish Smith) were not initially credited.

Released on February 17, 2004, "I Don't Wanna Know" spent eight consecutive weeks at number two on the US Billboard Hot 100, behind the Usher singles "Yeah!" and "Burn", respectively, and reached number one in Germany, the Netherlands, and the United Kingdom. It became a top-10 hit in many other countries, including Australia, Canada, France, Ireland, and New Zealand, and has received multiple sales certifications.

In 2022, record producer Metro Boomin, singer the Weeknd, and rapper 21 Savage released the single "Creepin'", a cover of the song mainly performed by the Weeknd, with a rap verse performed by 21 Savage instead of P. Diddy. Winans himself contributed to this version, while Diddy himself would be featured on the official remix of the song, released in March 2023.

== Composition ==
The song is sung over a background track that samples "Boadicea" by Enya from her 1987 debut album Enya, inspired by the use of the sample in the Fugees' 1996 hit single "Ready or Not". Winans said: "I first heard 'Boadicea' at the end of the movie Sleepwalkers about five or six years ago. It's something I always wanted to produce. Then when the Fugees did it, oh my God, I loved it."

== Critical reception ==
Vibe wrote that "Winans adds a simple stuttering beat that prevents the song from devolving into murky, saccharine Muzak. This is the secret of Winan's magic; the soft touch of the synthesizers and his gentle piano playing blend with the signature sound of the kick and snare – hard, unadorned, punching through the music's gauzy elegiac texture."

== Commercial performance ==
"I Don't Wanna Know" peaked at number two on the US Billboard Hot 100 for eight weeks and reached the same position on the Hot R&B/Hip-Hop Singles & Tracks chart. It topped the Billboard Rhythmic chart and also peaked at number four on the Mainstream Top 40 ranking. The song was a radio hit in Canada, reaching number two on Radio & Records' CHR/Pop Top 30 chart. Outside North America, the song reached number one on the Eurochart Hot 100, topping the charts of Germany, the Netherlands, and the United Kingdom. Across the rest of Europe, the song became a top-five hit in several regions, including Flanders, France, Ireland, Norway, and Switzerland. In Australasia, "I Don't Wanna Know" peaked at number two in Australia and number three in New Zealand.

== Track listings ==
Australian CD1 and UK CD single

1. "I Don't Wanna Know" – 4:17
2. "Pretty Girl Bullsh*t" (featuring Foxy Brown) – 4:22
3. "I Don't Wanna Know" (instrumental) – 4:17
4. "I Don't Wanna Know" (video)

Australian CD2

1. "I Don't Wanna Know" – 4:17
2. "I Already Know" – 1:54
3. "The Game" – 3:57
4. "I Don't Wanna Know" (video)

UK 12-inch single

A1. "I Don't Wanna Know" – 4:17
A2. "I Don't Wanna Know" (instrumental) – 4:17
B1. "Pretty Girl Bullsh*t" (featuring Foxy Brown) – 4:29
B2. "Pretty Girl Bullsh*t" (instrumental) – 4:30

UK mini-CD single and European CD single

1. "I Don't Wanna Know" – 4:17
2. "Pretty Girl Bullsh*t" (featuring Foxy Brown) – 4:22

== Charts ==
=== Weekly charts ===
Weekly chart performance for "I Don't Wanna Know"
Chart (2004)	Peak position
Australia (ARIA)	2
Australian Urban (ARIA)	1
Austria (Ö3 Austria Top 40)	6
Belgium (Ultratop 50 Flanders)	2
Belgium (Ultratop 50 Wallonia)	6
Canada CHR/Pop Top 30 (Radio & Records)	2
Croatia (HRT)	9
Denmark (Tracklisten)	3
Europe (Eurochart Hot 100)	1
France (SNEP)	4
Germany (GfK)	1
Greece (IFPI)	10
Hungary (Single Top 40)	6
Ireland (IRMA)	2
Italy (FIMI)	5
Netherlands (Dutch Top 40)	1
Netherlands (Single Top 100)	2
New Zealand (Recorded Music NZ)	3
Norway (VG-lista)	2
Poland (Polish Singles Chart)	5
Romania (Romanian Top 100)	5
Scottish Singles Sales (Official Charts)	1
Sweden (Sverigetopplistan)	11
Switzerland (Schweizer Hitparade)	2
UK Singles (Official Charts)	1
UK Hip Hop/R&B (Official Charts)	1
US Billboard Hot 100	2
US Hot R&B/Hip-Hop Singles & Tracks (Billboard)	2
US Mainstream Top 40 (Billboard)	4
US Rhythmic Top 40 (Billboard)	1

=== Year-end charts ===
Year-end chart performance for "I Don't Wanna Know"
Chart (2004)	Position
Australia (ARIA)	16
Australian Urban (ARIA)	6
Austria (Ö3 Austria Top 40)	30
Belgium (Ultratop 50 Flanders)	17
Belgium (Ultratop 50 Wallonia)	33
Germany (Media Control GfK)	10
Ireland (IRMA)	13
Italy (FIMI)	25
Netherlands (Dutch Top 40)	19
Netherlands (Single Top 100)	15
New Zealand (RIANZ)	16
Sweden (Hitlistan)	62
Switzerland (Schweizer Hitparade)	13
UK Singles (OCC)	11
UK Urban (Music Week)	6
US Billboard Hot 100	7
US Hot R&B/Hip-Hop Singles & Tracks (Billboard)	20
US Mainstream Top 40 (Billboard)	17
US Rhythmic Top 40 (Billboard)	9

== Certifications and sales ==
Certifications and sales for "I Don't Wanna Know"
Region	Certification	Certified units/sales
Australia (ARIA)	Platinum	70,000^{^}
Belgium (BRMA)	Gold	25,000^{*}
Germany (BVMI)	Gold	150,000^{‡}
New Zealand (RMNZ)	Gold	5,000^{*}
Norway (IFPI Norway)	Gold	5,000^{*}
United Kingdom (BPI) Physical	Silver	200,000^{^}
United Kingdom (BPI) Digital and streaming	Gold	400,000^{‡}
United States (RIAA)	Platinum	1,000,000^{‡}
^{*} Sales figures based on certification alone.^{^} Shipments figures based on certification alone.^{‡} Sales+streaming figures based on certification alone.

== Release history ==
Release dates and formats for "I Don't Wanna Know"
Region	Date	Format(s)	Label(s)	Ref.
United States	February 17, 2004	Rhythmic contemporary radio	Bad Boy	
United States	February 23, 2004	Urban radio	Bad Boy	
United States	March 29, 2004	Contemporary hit radio	Bad Boy	
United States	April 19, 2004	Urban AC radio	Bad Boy	
Australia	May 24, 2004	CD1	Bad Boy	
United Kingdom	May 31, 2004	12-inch vinyl; CD	Bad Boy	
Australia	June 14, 2004	CD2	Bad Boy	

== Answer songs ==
=== "You Should Really Know" ===
"You Should Really Know"

Single by the Pirates featuring Enya, Shola Ama, Naila Boss and Ishani
- Released: August 30, 2004
- Length: 3:19 (radio edit)
- Label: Relentless
- Songwriters: Mario Winans; Enya; Nicky Ryan; Roma Ryan; Lo Down; Chauncey Hawkins; Erick Sermon; Parrish Smith
- Producer: The Pirates

Enya singles chronology
"I Don't Wanna Know" (2004)	"You Should Really Know" (2004)	"Amarantine" (2005)

Shola Ama singles chronology
"Symphony" (2002)	"You Should Really Know" (2004)	"DJ Play" (2009)

Naila Boss singles chronology
"La La La" (2004)	"You Should Really Know" (2004)

Music video
- "You Should Really Know" on YouTube

An answer to "I Don't Wanna Know" sung from a female perspective, "You Should Really Know", was released later the same year as Winans' single, on August 30, 2004. Created by producers the Pirates, it features Shola Ama, Naila Boss, and Ishani, and it uses the same Enya sample as the original. It also credits the writers of "You're a Customer", unlike the original. Although "You Should Really Know" did not achieve the level of success Winans' single did in the US, it was a top-10 hit in the United Kingdom, peaking at number eight on the UK Singles Chart, and it also reached the top 50 in Austria, the Czech Republic, France, Greece, and Ireland.

==== Charts ====
Weekly charts

Weekly chart performance for "You Should Really Know"
Chart (2004–2005)	Peak position
Austria (Ö3 Austria Top 40)	41
Belgium (Ultratip Bubbling Under Flanders)	10
Belgium (Ultratip Bubbling Under Wallonia)	7
Czech Republic (IFPI)	2
France (SNEP)	49
Greece (IFPI)	17
Ireland (IRMA)	25
Romania (Romanian Top 100)	53
Scottish Singles Sales (Official Charts)	13
UK Singles (Official Charts)	8
UK Hip Hop/R&B (Official Charts)	3

Year-end charts

Year-end chart performance for "You Should Really Know"
Chart (2004)	Position
UK Singles (OCC)	108

=== Others ===
Later, another answer song called "I Already Know" sung by Noelle was released and had the same background melody as the original song. American R&B group Nina Sky also recorded their own version of their song entitled "Time to Go" featuring rapper Angie Martinez. The song has also been covered by Dega, a Kompa artist, featuring a rap verse from Wyclef Jean and a small section from T-Vice in the album Ba Li Gazzz in 2004.
