= Redemption (Benzino album) =

Studio album by Benzino
- Released: January 14, 2003
- Recorded: 2002
- Genres: East Coast hip hop; hardcore hip hop; gangsta rap
- Length: 1:06:23
- Labels: Elektra, ZNO Records
- Producers: Benzino (exec.); David Mays (exec.); Sylvia Rhone (exec.); Mario Winans (also exec.); Gary "Gizzo" Smith; Hangmen 3; L.E.S.; L.T. Hutton; Paul "Little Bo Peezy" Hemphill; Sean "Inferno" Dunnigan; That Nigga Moel; Tone Capone; Trackmasters

Benzino chronology
The Benzino Remix Project (2002)	Redemption (2003)	Arch Nemesis (2005)

Singles from Redemption
- 1. "Rock the Party" Released: September 3, 2002; 2. "Would You" Released: March 29, 2003

Professional ratings
Review scores
Source	Rating
AllMusic	2/5 stars
RapReviews	7/10
Robert Christgau	(dud)

Redemption is the second solo studio album by American rapper and record producer Benzino. It was released January 14, 2003 via Elektra Records and ZNO Records. Production was primarily handled by Benzino's production team Hangmen 3, as well as Mario Winans, Gary "Gizzo" Smith, L.E.S., L.T. Hutton, Paul "Little Bo Peezy" Hemphill, Sean "Inferno" Dunnigan, That Nigga Moel, Tone Capone and Trackmasters. It features guest appearances from Mario Winans, Mass Murderer Mike, Black Child, Caddillac Tah, Daz Dillinger, Hussein Fatal, Jadakiss, Jewell, Kid Javi, Lil' Kim, LisaRaye, Petey Pablo, Scarface and Wyclef Jean.

The album peaked at number 65 on the Billboard 200 and at number 31 on the Top R&B/Hip-Hop Albums. It featured two singles: "Rock the Party" and "Would You", both produced by Mario Winans. "Rock the Party" made it to number 82 on the Billboard Hot 100, and also appeared on the US version of The Transporter: Music from and Inspired by the Motion Picture, was featured in the 2002 film I-SPY and in the 2003 video game NBA Street Vol. 2.

The song "Pull Your Skirt Up" is a direct diss track aimed at Shady/Aftermath artists D12, G-Unit, Dr. Dre and Obie Trice, initially released as B-side of UK versions of "Rock the Party" single during ongoing Benzino and Eminem feud. While Benzino was recording the album, he made sure to work with people who were beefing with 50 Cent at the time, such as Black Child and Cadillac Tah from Murder Inc Records, Fatal and Lil' Kim.

== Track listing ==
No.	Title	Writer(s)	Producer(s)	Length
1.	"Stayin 4eva"	Raymond Scott; Antonio Perry; Lamont Dozier	That Nigga Moel	3:57
2.	"Call My Name" (featuring Jadakiss)	Scott; Jason Phillips; Leshan Lewis	L.E.S.	3:33
3.	"Rock the Party" (featuring Mario Winans)	Scott; Mario Winans; Michael Carlos Jones	Mario "Yellowman" Winans	3:47
4.	"Would You" (featuring Mario Winans and LisaRaye)	Scott; Winans; M. Jones; Frank Romano	Mario "Yellowman" Winans	3:55
5.	"Make You Wanna Holla"	Scott; Jeffrey Backues Neal; John Alfred Bynoe; Allan Felder; Ted Mills; Norman Harris; K. Blackmon	Hangmen 3	2:51
6.	"Neva Shuvin'" (featuring Wyclef Jean and Mass Murderer Mike)	Scott; Nel Ust Wyclef Jean; Mike McNeil; Anthony Grant; Neal; Bynoe	Hangmen 3	4:43
7.	"Gangsta's Touch" (featuring Caddillac Tah and Black Child)	Scott; Tiheem Crocker; Ramel Gill; Neal; Bynoe; Ahmed Driche Tidjani; Steve Hillage	Hangmen 3	4:16
8.	"Redemption (Rosary)" (featuring Fatal Hussein and Kid Javi)	Scott; Bruce Washington; Anthony Gilmour	Tone Capone	4:28
9.	"X-Tra Hot" (featuring Daz Dillinger and Jewell)	Scott; Delmar Arnaud; Lenton Terrell Hutton	L.T. Hutton	3:37
10.	"I Remember" (featuring Mario Winans)	Scott; Winans; Neal; Bynoe; Charles B. Simmons; Joseph Banks Jefferson; Richard William Roebuck	Hangmen 3	3:26
11.	"Get It On"	Scott; Paul Hemphill; S. Owens	Mario "Yellowman" Winans; Paul "Little Bo Peezy" Hemphill; Sean "Inferno" Dunnigan	3:30
12.	"44 Cal. Killa" (featuring Scarface and Mass Murderer Mike)	Scott; Brad Jordan; McNeil; Jean-Claude Olivier; Samuel Barnes	Trackmasters	3:52
13.	"Hoola Hoop"	Scott; Gary Smith; C. Peart; O. Holland	Gary "Gizzo" Smith	4:03
14.	"Different Kind of Lady"	Scott; Neal; Bynoe; K. Blackmon; T. Burgess; William Harrison Withers	Hangmen 3	3:19
15.	"Pull Your Skirt Up"	Scott; Gilmour	Tone Capone	3:51
16.	"Rock the Party (Young Heff Remix)" (featuring Mario Winans, Lil' Kim and Petey Pablo)	Scott; Winans; M. Jones; Kimberly Jones; Moses Barrett III	Mario "Yellowman" Winans	3:47
17.	"Love" (featuring Young Lo)	Scott; Robert James	Hassan	5:47
Total length:				1:06:23

Notes

- Track 1 features backing vocals by Famil
- Track 14 features backing vocals by LovHer

Sample credits

- Track 1 contains a sample of "Blue Sky and Silver Bird" by Lamont Dozier
- Track 5 contains samples from "Tear It Down" by Blue Magic
- Track 7 contains elements from "Aâlach Tloumouni" by Khaled
- Track 10 contains elements from "Maybe It's Love This Time" by The Stylistics
- Track 14 contains elements of "She's Lonely" written by Bill Withers

== Charts ==
Chart (2003)	Peak position
US Billboard 200	65
US Top R&B/Hip-Hop Albums (Billboard)	31
