= The Almighty RSO =

American hip hop group

- Origin: Boston, Massachusetts, U.S.
- Genres: East Coast hip-hop
- Years active: 1982–1997
- Labels: Rap-A-Lot; Tommy Boy; Warner Bros.; RCA; BMG
- Spinoff of: Made Men
- Past members: Ray Dogg; E-Devious; Tony Rhome; DJ Deff Jeff; Rock (deceased)

The Almighty RSO, formerly known as the RSO Crew, was an American hip hop group from Boston, Massachusetts. Members included MCs E-Devious (Marco Antonio Ennis, later known as Antonio Twice Thou), Ray Dogg (Raymond Scott, later known as Benzino), Tony Rhome (Anthony Johnson), Rock (Rodney Pitts) and DJ Deff Jeff (Jeffrey Neal). The group was part of Boston's early hip-hop scene in the 1980s and went on to release records into the 1990s.

== History ==
Initially I would think of RSO Crew who were from here [Boston] and making any type of noise. Locally, if I turned on the radio, those would be the guys that I would know who they were and follow their songs. I've definitely been checking them out from the beginning.

— Akrobatik on The Almighty RSO

=== Early history (1982-1989) ===
The group formed in 1982 and would frequent local hip-hop clubs such as Ben's Lounge and Ripley Road. One of their first breakthroughs was winning the ICA B-Town Rap Battle in 1986. DJ Deff Jeff was famous for his deejay performance where he would set two small trays on fire on top of his turntables while performing DJ tricks. The following year The Almighty RSO received the Boston Music Award for Best Rap Group. In 1988 they released the single, "We're Notorious", posing with fake guns on the album cover.

=== Major label signings (1990-1996) ===
Tommy Boy Records signed the group to a deal in 1990. That same year, group member Rodney "Rock" Pitts was stabbed to death at a night club. The Almighty RSO released their only single on Tommy Boy titled "One in the Chamba". The song, which was inspired by two killings of youths by Boston Police, created controversy when the Boston Police Patrolmen's Association (BPPA) pressed charges against the group under a state law that prohibits inciting assaults against public figures. Tommy Boy Records soon after dropped the group from their label.

In 1994 they released the EP Revenge of da Badd Boyz on RCA Records. The Almighty RSO spent a short period being part of Queen Latifah's Flavor Unit, appearing on the album Rollin' With The Flavor.

In 1996, they produced their first full-length LP, Doomsday: Forever RSO on Noo Trybe Records/Rap-A-Lot Records, which included the singles "You Could Be My Boo" featuring Faith Evans, "The War's On" featuring Mobb Deep and "You'll Never Know" .

=== Later history ===
In 1998, Scott (now known as Benzino) and Ennis (now known as Twice Thou) formed the group Made Men with Cool Gsus and released an album entitled Classic Limited Edition.

== Discography ==
=== Studio albums ===
- Doomsday: Forever RSO (1996)

=== Extended plays ===
- Revenge of da Badd Boyz (1994)

=== Other related releases ===
- Wiseguys – In Tha Company of Killaz (1996)
- Made Men – Classic Limited Edition (1998)
- Hangmen 3 – No Skits Vol. 1 (2000)
