= Revenge of da Badd Boyz =

EP by The Almighty RSO
- Released: September 27, 1994
- Recorded: 1993–94
- Genres: East Coast hip hop; hardcore hip hop
- Length: 25:02
- Label: RCA
- Producers: Ray Dog (also exec.); Hangmen 3 (exec.)

The Almighty RSO chronology
Revenge of da Badd Boyz (1994)	Doomsday: Forever RSO (1996)

Professional ratings
Review scores
Source	Rating
AllMusic	2.5/5 stars

Revenge of da Badd Boyz is the only extended play by American rap group The Almighty RSO. It was released on September 27, 1994 through RCA Records. The album managed to make it to #97 on the Top R&B/Hip-Hop Albums.

== Track listing ==
No.	Title	Length
1.	"Hellbound" (The RSO Saga Part 2)	5:34
2.	"Revenge of da Badd Boyz"	4:02
3.	"One of Those Nightz" (featuring Freddie Foxxx)	3:51
4.	"One in the Chamba" (The RSO Saga Part 1)	5:08
5.	"Out on Parole (Time to Flip)" (featuring The Wild Juvenile ROCK)	1:00
6.	"5 Minutes of Doom (Comin' from the Legion)" (featuring Beef, Big Roscoe, Buddha Man, Cool Gsus, Fly Ty, Mass Murderer Mike & ACE, Moty, and Tangg The Juice)	5:27
Total length:		25:02
