= Rock the Party (disambiguation) =

"Rock the Party" is a 2001 song by Five.

Rock the Party may also refer to:

- "Rock the Party" (Benzino song), 2002
- "Rock the Party (Off the Hook)", by P.O.D., 2000

== See also ==
- "Rock This Party (Everybody Dance Now)", a 2006 song by Bob Sinclar
- Rock tha Party, an album by Bombay Rockers
