= The Benzino Remix Project =

Remix album by Benzino
- Released: June 18, 2002
- Genre: East Coast hip hop, gangsta rap
- Length: 70:06
- Label: Elektra ZNO Records
- Producer: Ray Benzino (exec.), Hangmen 3, P. Diddy, Teddy Riley, D-Dot, Trackmasters

Benzino chronology
The Benzino Project (2001)	The Benzino Remix Project (2002)	Redemption (2003)

Professional ratings
Review scores
Source	Rating
Allmusic	3.5/5 stars

The Benzino Remix Project is a collection of remixed songs from Boston, Massachusetts rapper Benzino, released June 18, 2002 on Elektra Records. The original versions of the tracks appear on 2001's The Benzino Project.

== Track listing ==
1. "617 Intro"
2. "Who's Benzino?" (featuring P. Diddy)
3. "Bang Ta Dis"
4. "Feel Your Pain" (featuring Outlawz)
5. "We Reppin Y'all" (featuring Made Men)
6. "Hallway (Skit)"
7. "Figadoh (Remix)" (featuring Busta Rhymes & M.O.P.)
8. "Bang Ta Dis" (Remix) (featuring Prodigy & Bars & Hooks)
9. "Nobody Liver" (featuring Pink)
10. "Picture This" (featuring Foxy Brown)
11. "Any Questions?" (featuring Black Rob)
12. "No Parts Of Us" (featuring Bobby Brown & Prodigy)
13. "So Beautiful" (featuring Dr. Bellotoma)
14. "G-A-N-G-S-T-E-R"
15. "Big Trev (Skit)"
16. "Boottee (Remix)" (featuring Fabolous & G. Dep)
17. "The Jump Up" (featuring Cormega, Raekwon & Superb)
18. "Shine Like My Son" (featuring Case & Ray Ray)
19. "I'm Fucked Up (Skit)" (featuring Mike McNeil)
20. "Throw Dem 3s (Boston Niggas)" (featuring K.T., Luv, O.T., Prince, Smoke & Weirdo)
21. "Go Hard"
22. "Niggas Don't Want It"
