= Troglodyte (Cave Man) =

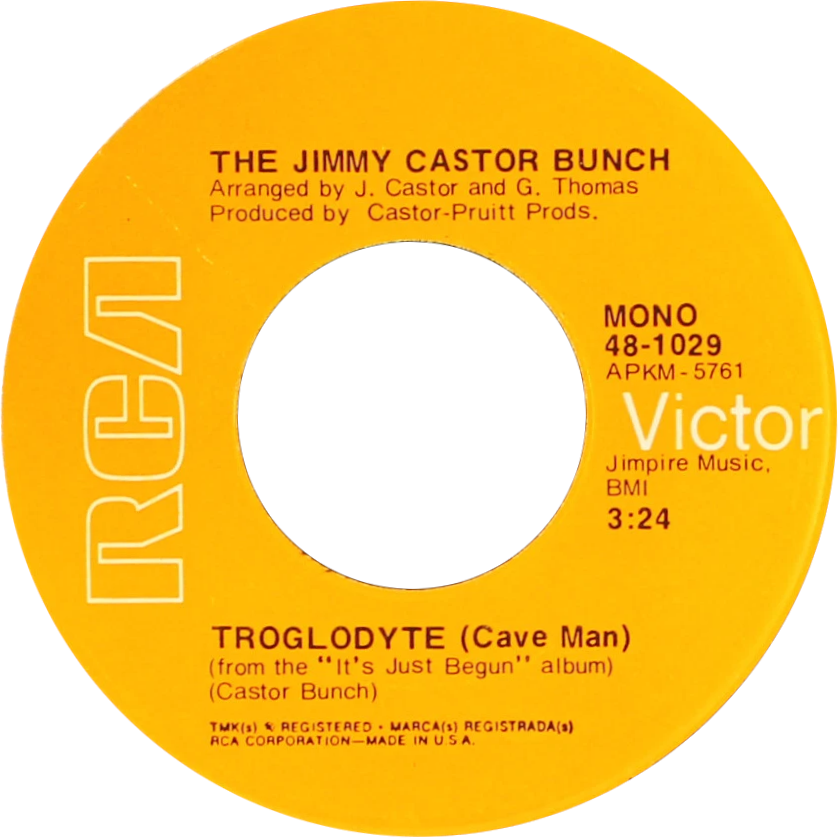
- Side A of the US single

Single by Jimmy Castor Bunch

from the album It's Just Begun
- B-side: "I Promise to Remember"
- Released: 1972
- Genre: Funk
- Length: 3:36; 3:22 (7" version)
- Label: RCA

"Troglodyte (Cave Man)", originally released as "Troglodite", is a 1972 novelty funk song by the Jimmy Castor Bunch. In the US, it peaked at No. 4 on the R&B chart and No. 6 on the Billboard Hot 100. Billboard ranked it as the No. 80 song for 1972. It peaked at #2 on the Cashbox charts as well.

In Canada, the song reached No. 1 for two weeks in July 1972, and was No. 29 on the RPM/Kowal year-end chart.

"Troglodyte" sold over half-a-million copies, and has been certified gold by the RIAA.

== Background ==
A character introduced in the song, Bertha Butt ("one of the Butt Sisters"), was featured in many later Castor Bunch songs, including "The Bertha Butt Boogie" (1975).

The song has been sampled in hip-hop and dance music.

== Chart performance ==
Chart (1972)	Peak position
US Billboard Hot 100	6
US Billboard Best Selling Soul Singles	4
