= Street's Disciple =

Studio album by Nas
- Released: November 30, 2004
- Recorded: 2003–2004
- Genre: Hip-hop
- Length: 87:33
- Labels: Ill Will; Columbia; Sony Urban
- Producers: Nas; Chucky Thompson; Salaam Remi; L.E.S.; Buckwild; Bernardo "Nardo" Williams; Nut; T. Black; Q-Tip; Herb Middleton

Nas chronology
God's Son (2002)	Street's Disciple (2004)	Hip Hop Is Dead (2006)

Singles from Street's Disciple
- 1. "Thief's Theme" Released: June 29, 2004; 2. "Bridging the Gap" Released: October 5, 2004; 3. "Just a Moment" Released: February 22, 2005

Street's Disciple is the seventh studio album by American rapper Nas, released as a double album by Ill Will Records, Columbia Records, and Sony Urban Music. Originally scheduled for a September 14, 2004 release, the album was ultimately released on November 30, 2004. Named after one of his lyrics from "Live at the Barbeque" by Main Source, the album's cover art was digitally created using photos of Nas to create an adaptation of The Last Supper. The album marked the end of Nas' tenure with Columbia Records after ten years.

Street's Disciple was well received by critics and debuted at number 5 on the US Billboard 200, selling over 232,000 copies in its first week of sales. It was Nas's seventh consecutive platinum record in the United States, having shipped over 1 million copies.

== Production ==
Most of the album's production was handled between Salaam Remi, L.E.S. and Chucky Thompson of Sean Combs' production team The Hitmen. Remi contributed production on eleven tracks, L.E.S. produced on eight and Chucky Thompson helped on six. Salaam Remi (who collaborated with Nas on his previous LPs Stillmatic and God's Son) led all with nine solo productions. L.E.S. only produced three solo outings, but one included the single "Just a Moment". Thompson, on the other hand, had one solo production credit ("Getting Married").

Other notable producers from the album include A Tribe Called Quest member Q-Tip (who had last worked with Nas on Illmatic's "One Love" and the remix of "The World Is Yours") and D.I.T.C. producer Buckwild ("These Are Our Heroes"). Nas himself produced "Suicide Bounce" and "U.B.R. (Unauthorized Biography of Rakim)", both from the second disc. L.E.S. also brought on baggage for his productions. T. Black and Nut assisted the legendary producer on "The Makings of a Perfect Bitch" and Herb Middleton helped with the beat on "Me &You (Dedicated to Destiny)". Chucky Thompson, too, brought in extra help for "Live Now" (Barnardo "Nardo" Williams). Rapper Ill Bill made a song similar to "U.B.R. (Unauthorized Biography Of Rakim)" titled "U.B.S. (Unauthorized Biography Of Slayer)" on his album The Hour of Reprisal (2008).

== Music ==
Nas' father Olu Dara appears on the title track "Street's Disciple" and lead single "Bridging the Gap". Aside from Ludacris ("Virgo") and Quan ("Just a Moment") no other MC's actually deliver a verse on Street's Disciple. Busta Rhymes plays hypeman to "Suicide Bounce" and Doug E. Fresh beatboxes on "Virgo". Kelis (Nas' ex-wife) helps sing the chorus along with the bridge on "American Way". The album has many guest singers, including: Amerie ("Rest of My Life"), Emily ("Reason"), Maxwell ("No One Else in the Room") and Keon Bryce ("War"). Nas also uses a voice synthesizer to make his voice high-pitched for his female alter-ego Scarlett, who appears on "Sekou Story" and "Live Now".

Street's Disciple features multiple socio-conscious and political songs, such as "A Message to the Feds, Sincerely, We the People", "American Way" and "These Are Our Heroes". The latter (originally titled "Coon's Picnic") contained attacks directed toward multiple black celebrities including: O. J. Simpson and NBA superstar Kobe Bryant. Another topic addressed by Nas were important women in his life or females in general. "Getting Married" is dedicated to his then-newlywed wife Kelis Rogers-Jones, "Me & You (Dedicated to Destiny)" is, aptly titled, directed toward Nas' daughter and "Makings of a Perfect Bitch" describes most men's idea of the ideal woman. Death and appreciating life are the subject to several songs as well such as "Live Now", "Rest of My Life" and "Just a Moment".

== Release and reception ==
Professional ratings
Aggregate scores
Source	Rating
Metacritic	80/100
Review scores
Source	Rating
AllMusic	3.5/5 stars
Blender	3.5/5 stars
Entertainment Weekly	A–
The Guardian	4/5 stars
NME	9/10
Pitchfork	7.2/10
Rolling Stone	3.5/5 stars
Stylus Magazine	B
USA Today	3.5/4 stars
The Village Voice	A–

Street's Disciple was released by Columbia Records on November 30, 2004, to widespread critical acclaim. At Metacritic, which assigns a normalized rating out of 100 to reviews from mainstream publications, the album received an average score of 80, based on 16 reviews. Chicago Sun-Times writer Jeff Vrabel called it "sprawling and ambitious", while Robert Christgau from The Village Voice found its double-CD length "ambitious not hubristic, imposing not indigestible", and wrote that Nas "finally seems comfortable with his (black) humanity. He's responsible, thoughtful, and compassionate, never mealymouthed". He later named it the 11th best album of 2004 in his year-end list for the Pazz & Jop critics poll. Rolling Stone magazine's Jon Caramanica said it was "the rare instance of hip-hop old and wise enough to look backward without forgetting what it was like to look ahead with awe and wonder". Noah Callahan-Bever of Vibe was less enthusiastic, finding much of the songs "routine", suggesting Nas "needs new challenges, enlightening experiences, and careful insights to inspire him".

In the first week of its release, the album debuted at number five on the Billboard 200 and sold 232,000 copies in the United States. On November 18, 2005, it was certified Platinum by the Recording Industry Association of America (RIAA), having shipped one million copies. It was Nas's seventh consecutive platinum record in the US. "Bridging the Gap" was the album's only single to chart on the Billboard Hot 100, peaking at number 94.

== Track listing ==
Credits adapted from the album's liner notes.

Disc one
No.	Title	Writer(s)	Producer(s)	Length
1.	"Intro"			1:50
2.	"A Message to the Feds, Sincerely, We the People"	Nasir Jones; Salaam Gibbs; Carl Thompson; Isaac Hayes; Leshan Lewis	Chucky Thompson; Salaam Remi; L.E.S.	2:15
3.	"Nazareth Savage"	Jones; Gibbs; Barry White	Salaam Remi	2:40
4.	"American Way" (featuring Kelis)	Jones; Kamaal Fareed; Kelis Rogers; George Clinton; Garry Shider; David Spradley	Q-Tip	4:09
5.	"These Are Our Heroes"	Jones; Anthony Best	Buckwild	4:22
6.	"Disciple"	Jones; Lewis	L.E.S.	3:00
7.	"Sekou Story" (featuring Scarlett)	Jones; Gibbs; James Brown; Kool & the Gang; Lightnin' Rod	Salaam Remi	2:56
8.	"Live Now" (featuring Scarlett)	Jones; Thompson; Maurice White; Verdine White; Eddie del Barrio	Chucky Thompson; Bernardo "Nardo" Williams	4:30
9.	"Rest of My Life"	Jones; Lewis; Thompson	L.E.S.; Chucky Thompson; Salaam Remi (vocals)	3:50
10.	"Just a Moment" (featuring Quan)	Jones; Clifford Peacock; Lewis; Bernard Edwards; Nile Rodgers	L.E.S.	4:23
11.	"Reason" (featuring Emily)	Jones; Lewis; Thompson; Emily Cowing	Chucky Thompson, L.E.S.	4:47
12.	"You Know My Style"	Jones; Gibbs; Joseph Simmons; Darryl McDaniels; Larry Smith	Salaam Remi	2:52
Total length:				41:34

Disc two
No.	Title	Writer(s)	Producer(s)	Length
1.	"Suicide Bounce" (featuring Busta Rhymes)	Jones; Gibbs; Peacock; Arthur Baker; Vincent Fuller; Donald Hawkes	Nas	3:57
2.	"Street's Disciple" (featuring Olu Dara)	Jones; Gibbs	Salaam Remi	3:57
3.	"U.B.R. (Unauthorized Biography of Rakim)"	Jones	Nas	3:38
4.	"Virgo" (featuring Doug E. Fresh and Ludacris)	Jones; Gibbs; Douglas Davis; Christopher Bridges	Salaam Remi	3:26
5.	"Remember the Times" (Intro)			0:51
6.	"Remember the Times"	Jones; Lewis; Russell Stone	L.E.S.	3:23
7.	"The Makings of a Perfect Bitch"	Jones; Lewis; Terry Black; Philip Howard	L.E.S.; T. Black; Nut	3:15
8.	"Getting Married"	Jones; Thompson; Hayes	Chucky Thompson	3:46
9.	"No One Else in the Room" (featuring Maxwell)	Jones; Gibbs; Thompson	Salaam Remi; Chucky Thompson	5:08
10.	"Bridging the Gap" (featuring Olu Dara)	Jones; Olu Dara; Gibbs	Salaam Remi	3:56
11.	"War" (featuring Keon Bryce)	Jones; Gibbs; Keon Bryce	Salaam Remi	4:17
12.	"Me & You (Dedicated to Destiny)"	Jones; Lewis; Marvin Gaye; Herb Middleton	L.E.S.; Herb "Staff" Middleton	3:26
13.	"Thief's Theme"	Jones; Gibbs; Doug Ingle	Salaam Remi	2:59
Total length:				45:59

Sample credits

- "A Message to the Feds, Sincerely, We the People" contains samples from "Good Ole Music", written by George Clinton, performed by Funkadelic.
- "Nazareth Savage" contains excerpts from "I'm Gonna Love You Just a Little More Baby", written by Barry White, performed by Jimmy Smith.
- "American Way" contains samples from "Atomic Dog", written by George Clinton, Garry Shider, and David Spradley, performed by George Clinton.
- "Sekou Story" contains excerpts from "Take Me Just As I Am", written by James Brown, performed by Lyn Collins. It also contains excerpts from "Sport", performed by Lightnin' Rod.
- "Live Now" contains interpolations of "Fantasy", written by Maurice White, Verdine White, and Eddie del Barrio.
- "Just a Moment" contains samples from "Will You Cry", written by Bernard Edwards and Nile Rodgers, performed by Chic.
- "You Know My Style" contains samples from "Jam Master Jay", written by Joseph Simmons, Darryl McDaniels, and Larry Smith, performed by Run-DMC.
- "Suicide Bounce" contains interpolations from "Battle Cry", written by Arthur Baker, Vincent Fuller, and Donald Hawkes.
- "Remember the Times" contains excerpts from "We Do It", written by Russell Stone, performed by Carol Douglas.
- "Getting Married" contains interpolations of "Ike's Mood 1", written by Isaac Hayes.
- "Me & You (Dedicated to Destiny)" contains interpolations from "If This World Were Mine", written by Marvin Gaye.
- "Thief's Theme" contains excerpts from "In-A-Gadda-Da-Vida", written by Doug Ingle, performed by Michael Viner and The Incredible Bongo Band.

== Personnel ==
Performance

- Nas – Rap Vocals (all tracks), Scarlett's Vocals performed by (tracks 1–07, 1–08), Multiple Instruments (2–03)
- John F. Adams – Fender Rhodes Piano (track 2–11), Strings (2–11)
- Amerie – Background Vocals (track 1–09)
- Kathryn Bostic – Operatic Vocals (track 2–01)
- Olu Dara – Vocals (tracks 2–02, 2–10), Harmonica (2–10), Trumpet (2–10), Lead Guitar (2–10)
- David Downing – Cello (track 2–02)
- Doug E. Fresh – Human Beatbox (track 2–04)
- Jesse "DJ No Request" Gladstone – Additional Scratches (tracks 1–04, 1–07)
- Vincent Henry – Clarinet (tracks 1–03, 2–09), Flute (1–03, 2–09), Baritone Saxophone (2–10), Tenor Saxophone (1–03, 2–09, 2–11), Alto Saxophone (1–03, 2–09, 2–11), Harmonica (2–10), Strings (2–10), Additional Guitar (2–10)
- L.E.S. – Drums (tracks 1–02, 1–09), Drum Machine (1–09), All Other Instruments (1–06, 1–10)
- Herb Middleton – Keyboards (track 2–12), Bass played by (2–12)
- Nut – Keyboards (tracks 1–06, 1–10, 2–07)
- Bruce Purse – Trumpet & Flugelhorn (tracks 1–03, 2–09, 2–11)
- Quan – Outro Background Vocals (track 2–01)
- Salaam Remi – Organ played by (track 1–02), Guitar (1–02, 1–03), Bass played by (1–02, 1–03, 2–02, 2–09, 2–10, 2–11), Fender Rhodes Piano (1–03, 2–09), Drums (1–03, 2–02, 2–10, 2–11), Piano (2–02), Strings (2–09), Synthesizer (2–09), Additional Guitar (2–10), Horns arranged by (2–09), Multiple Instruments (1–07, 1–12, 2–01, 2–06, 2–13)
- Makeba Riddick – Background Vocals (track 2–12)
- Chucky Thompson – Piano (track 1–02), Guitar (1–02, 2–09), Drums (1–02, 2–09), Bass played by (1–02, 1–09), Hi-Hat Cymbal (1–09), Percussion (2–09), Multiple Instruments (1–08, 2–08)

Production & Technical

- Executive Producers: Nasir Jones, Salaam Remi, L.E.S.
- Recording Engineers: Kevin Crouse (tracks 1–01 to 1–12, 2–01 to 2–10, 2–12 to 2–13), Gary Noble (2–11), Carlton Lynn (Additional Music on 1–08)
- Assistant Recording Engineers: Jesse "DJ No Request" Gladstone (tracks 1–02, 1–04, 1–05, 1–08 to 1–11, 2–01, 2–03, 2–04, 2–06, 2–07), Bevin Robinson (1–02, 1–04, 1–05, 1–08 to 1–11, 2–01, 2–03, 2–04, 2–06, 2–07), Colin Miller (1–03, 2–01), Rob Marks (1–03, 1–09, 1–12, 2–02, 2–10 to 2–13), Mark Rinaldi (1–06, 1–07, 2–12), Ryan Evans (1–06, 1–07, 1–09, 2–06, 2–09, 2–12), Mimi (2–01, 2–07), Ben Kane (2–03), Alex Ndionne (2–11)
- Audio Mixing: Kevin Crouse (all tracks)
- Assistant Audio Mixing: Mark Rinaldi (track 1–12)
- Mastering: Chris Gehringer
- A&R Direction: Mike Brinkley, Timothy "Gov" Ballard, Dino Delvaille
- Album Coordination for Sony Urban Music: Nikki Martin
- Marketing: David Belgrave
- Management: Sara Newkirk
- Legal Representation: Peter Paterno ESQ, Michelle Jubelirer
- Art Direction & Design: Chris Feldmann
- Photography: Danny Clinch
- Imaging: Justin Cohen
- Graphic Artist: Patrick Cahalan
- Prop Stylist: Debora Francis
- Stylist: Tiffany Hassbourne

== Charts ==
=== Weekly charts ===
Chart (2004)	Peak position
Canadian Albums (Nielsen SoundScan)	27
Dutch Albums (Album Top 100)	82
French Albums (SNEP)	54
Japanese Albums (Oricon)	38
Norwegian Albums (VG-lista)	40
Scottish Albums (Official Charts)	62
Swiss Albums (Schweizer Hitparade)	27
UK Albums (Official Charts)	45
UK R&B Albums (Official Charts)	4
US Billboard 200	5
US Top R&B/Hip-Hop Albums (Billboard)	2

=== Year-end charts ===
Chart (2005)	Position
US Billboard 200	97
US Top R&B/Hip-Hop Albums (Billboard)	24

== Certifications ==
Region	Certification	Certified units/sales
Canada (Music Canada)	Gold	50,000^{^}
United Kingdom (BPI)	Silver	60,000^{^}
United States (RIAA)	Platinum	1,000,000^{^}
^{^} Shipments figures based on certification alone.
