= The Antidote (Benzino album) =

Studio album by Benzino
- Released: August 21, 2007
- Recorded: 2006–2007
- Genre: Hip hop
- Length: 78:23
- Label: 7th Floor Music, ZNO Records
- Producer: Cognito, Gorilla Tek, Hangmen 3, J. Drumz, Nacho Typical, Scott Storch, Stevie J, TracKings Productions, Ty Fyffe

Benzino chronology
Arch Nemesis (2005)	The Antidote (2007)

The Antidote is the fourth solo album by Boston, Massachusetts rapper Benzino, released August 21, 2007 on 7th Floor Music.

== Background ==
The album's first single "Back On My Grizzy" is produced by Ty Fyffe (who also produced 50 Cent's lead single "Straight to the Bank"). The Antidote also features production from such rap notables as Scott Storch, Hangmen 3, Stevie J, Rick Ross, Cognito, Gorilla Tek, TracKings, DJ KEVIS and Nacho Typical, and appearances by Stevie J and Ja Rule. A noticeable theme is that S is replaced by Z in most of the song titles.

Benzino's The Antidote introduces his new crew, made up of MC's from Miami, New York, and his hometown of Boston, collectively known as The 1st 48. The 1st 48 includes rappers One Monzta, Lil Dev, Picalo, Ballgrum, Cognito, Young LO, Young Hardy (Which LO and Hardy have previously been in the rap group, The Untouchables with Benzino) and 8Bus Columni. The album package includes the DVD "Countdown To Antidote," which allows fans to spend 3 days in real-time with Benzino and The 1st 48, and also includes 5 bonus music videos.

== Track listing ==
#	Song	Featured Artists
1	American Z	
2	On My Grizzy	
3	A Bad Year (Skit)	
4	Pocket Full of GZZZ	Ballgrum & One Monzta
5	Howuwannit	Young Lo
6	Run Up	Xavier & The Untouchables
7	The Interview (Skit)	
8	Gameface	Ja Rule & Lil Dev
9	Scarface (skit)	
10	Return of the Nemeziz	T-Drop a.k.a. Roxe Karvell
11	Kilo & Nate (Skit)	
12	Huztle All Day	T Drop a.k.a. Roxe Karvell
13	Rollin'	Stevie J
14	Gotta Girl	Kalenna
15	Zexxxy	Rick Ross
16	Picalo (Skit)	
17	Re-Up	Ballgrum, Lil Dev & Picallo
18	DJ Johnie Bee in Greece (skit)	
19	Let It Bang	Price & Punchy
20	Gimme Dat	Cognito & Lil Dev
21	If It'z About Game	Cognito, One Monzta, Picallo & Tycoon
22	The Departed	The Untouchables & One Monzta
23	Armed & Dangerouz	Ballgrum & Hennessey
24	Ztill a Myztery	The Untouchables
25	48 Lawz of Power"	1st 48 & Ugly
