= Story of My Heart =

Studio album by Mario Winans
- Released: June 24, 1997
- Recorded: 1996–1997; Studio LaCoCo, Silent Sound, Doppler Studios, D.A.R.P. Studios; Atlanta, Georgia; Vanguard Studios; Oak Park, Michigan; Giant Recording Studios; New York City, New York
- Genre: R&B
- Length: 65:54
- Label: Motown
- Producers: Mario Winans; Trackmasters

Mario Winans chronology
Story of My Heart (1997)	Hurt No More (2004)

Singles from Story of My Life
- 1. "Don't Know" Released: 1997

Professional ratings
Review scores
Source	Rating
AllMusic	3/5 stars
USA Today	3/4 stars

Story of My Heart is the debut studio album by R&B singer Mario Winans under the name Mario "Yellow Man" Winans. The album was released on June 24, 1997 under Motown Records. As of April 2004, the album sold just 15,500 copies in America.

== Track listing ==
1. "Prayerlude" (Mario Winans) (0:59)
2. "Every Now and Then" (Mario Winans, Kenneth "Hicklo" Hickson) (4:16)
3. "Stay with Me" (Mario Winans) (4:32)
4. "Arouse Me" (Mario Winans) (4:41)
5. "Don't Know" (Mario Winans, Artie Hoyle) (3:59)
6. "Love Man" (Mario Winans) (4:34)
7. "I Wanna Be Your Man" (Interlude) (Mario Winans) (0:55)
8. "You Never Know" (Mario Winans, Kenneth "Hicklo" Hickson) (3:56)
9. "Come Back Home" (Mario Winans, Kenneth "Hicklo" Hickson) (4:43)
10. "My Sweetheart" (Mario Winans) (3:36)
11. "Don't Know Remix" (featuring Mase and Allure) (Mario Winans, Mason Betha, Samuel Barnes, Jean-Claude Olivier) (4:35)
12. "It's All Good" (Mario Winans, Kenneth "Hicklo" Hickson) (3:48)
13. "Don't Take Your Love Away" (Mario Winans, Kenneth "Hicklo" Hickson) (3:45)
14. "One Last Chance" (Mario Winans, Kenneth "Hicklo" Hickson) (3:57)
15. "Love Is in the Air" (Mario Winans, Kenneth "Hicklo" Hickson) (5:26)
16. "Loving Arms" (Mario Winans, Kenneth "Hicklo" Hickson) (3:58)
17. "Take My Breath Away" (Mario Winans, Kenneth "Hicklo" Hickson) (4:14)

== Personnel ==
- Mario Winans: All instruments and drum programming on all songs except "Don't Know (Remix)", executive producer
- Donyell Boynton: Additional keyboards on "Don't Take Your Love Away"
- Poke And Tone: Drum programming on "Don't Know (Remix)"
- Timothy "Tyme" Riley: Keyboards on "Don't Know (Remix)"
- Brian Smith: Recording engineer
- Paul D. Allen: Recording engineer, mixing
- Carlton Lynn: Recording engineer
- Bryan Frye: Recording engineer
- Robin Moore: Recording engineer, mixing
- Alvin Speights: mixing
- Matthew "Matty Kats" Katsikas: mixing
- Vernon Mungo: mixing
- Andre Harrell: Executive producer
- Edward "Eddie F." Ferrell: Executive producer, A&R direction
- Perri "Pebbles" Reid: Executive producer
- Andrew "Sugar Dice" Ramhdanny: Executive producer
- Herb Powers: Mastering
- Elli Hershko: Photography
- David Harley: Art direction, design

== Samples ==
- "Every Now and Then" contains a sample of "Make Me Say It Again Girl" as performed by The Isley Brothers
- "Don't Know" contains a sample of "With You in Mind" as performed by Acoustic Alchemy
- "Don't Know (Remix)" contains an interpolation of "A Day in the Life" as performed by Diamond D featuring Brand Nubian
- "It's All Good" contains a sample of "I'll Be Good to You" as performed by The Brothers Johnson
- "Don't Take Your Love Away" contains an interpolation of "Westchester Lady" as performed by Bob James
- "One Last Chance" contains a sample of "Sarah Victoria" as performed by Acoustic Alchemy
