= Doomsday: Forever RSO =

Studio album by The Almighty RSO
- Released: November 19, 1996
- Recorded: 1994–96
- Studio: Soundtrack Studios (Boston, MA); Platinum Island Studios (New York, NY); Ultimate Sounds Studio (Houston, TX); The Enterprise (Los Angeles, CA); Chung King Studios (New York, NY); Digital Services (Houston, TX)
- Genre: East Coast hip hop; mafioso rap
- Length: 1:05:53
- Label: Surrender; Rap-A-Lot; Noo Trybe
- Producer: Crazy C; DJ Storm; Doc Doom; Havoc; Hangmen 3; John Bido; KayGee; Mad House; Smoke One Productions; Terrence 'Bearwolf' Williams; Troy "Pee Wee" Clark

The Almighty RSO chronology
Revenge of da Badd Boyz (1994)	Doomsday: Forever RSO (1996)

Singles from Doomsday: Forever RSO
- 1. "You'll Never Know" Released: 1994; 2. "Those Summer Knightz" Released: 1995; 3. "War's On" Released: 1996; 4. "You Could Be My Boo" Released: 1996

Professional ratings
Review scores
Source	Rating
AllMusic	3/5 stars
RapReviews	8/10
The Source	3.5/5 stars

Doomsday: Forever RSO is the only full-length studio album by American hip hop group The Almighty RSO. It was released on November 19, 1996 through Rap-A-Lot Records.

Recording sessions took place at Soundtrack Studios in Boston, Platinum Island Studios and Chung King Studios in New York, Ultimate Sounds Studio and Digital Services in Houston, and The Enterprise in Los Angeles.

Production was handled by Hangmen 3, Crazy C, DJ Storm, Doc Doom, Havoc, John Bido, KayGee, Mad House, Smoke One Productions, Terrence 'Bearwolf' Williams, and Pee Wee. It features guest appearances from Cool Gsus, 8Ball & MJG, D-Ruff, Faith Evans, Fuckamon, Mad Lion, Mass Murderin' Mike, Mobb Deep, M.O.P., Smif-N-Wessun and Tangg The Juice.

The album only did slightly better than the group's previous release, peaking at number 52 on the US Billboard Top R&B/Hip-Hop Albums chart. It featured a single "War's On", which also appeared on the Original Gangstas soundtrack. The album's only charting single, "You Could Be My Boo", made it to No. 4 on the Bubbling Under Hot 100, No. 49 on the Hot R&B/Hip-Hop Songs and No. 10 on the Hot Rap Songs charts in the United States.

== Track listing ==
No.	Title	Writer(s)	Producer(s)	Length
1.	"Doomsday Intro"			0:38
2.	"Forever RSO"	Marco Ennis; Raymond Scott; Anthony Johnson; John Okuribido; D. Ellis; Paul Richmond	John Bido; Pee Wee (co.)	4:38
3.	"The War's On" (featuring Mobb Deep)	Ennis; Scott; Anthony Johnson; Albert Johnson; Kejuan Muchita	Havoc	4:23
4.	"Thought You Knew"	Ennis; Scott; Anthony Johnson; Simon Cullins; Terrence Williams	Crazy C; Bearwolf	4:24
5.	"Gotta Be a Better Way"	Ennis; Scott; Anthony Johnson; R. Moore; Donald Davis	Hangmen 3	3:55
6.	"Summer Knightz" (featuring Tangg The Juice)	Ennis; Scott; Antony Altamirano; Leo Okeke; Rudolph Isley; O'Kelly Isley Jr.; Ronald Isley; Ernie Isley; Marvin Isley; Chris Jasper	Hangmen 3	4:06
7.	"Sanity" (featuring D-Ruff)	Ennis; Scott; Anthony Johnson; David Ruffin Jr.; Okeke; James Harris III; Terry Lewis	Hangmen 3	4:16
8.	"You'll Never Know" (featuring Mad Lion)	Ennis; Scott; Anthony Johnson; Oswald Preece; Cullins	Crazy C	4:32
9.	"You Could Be My Boo" (featuring Faith Evans)	Ennis; Scott; Cullins	Crazy C	4:47
10.	"Mix of Action"	Ennis; Scott; Anthony Johnson; Okeke; Roy Ayers	Hangmen 3	4:31
11.	"Keep Alive" (featuring Cool Gsus)	Ennis; Scott; Anthony Johnson; Anthony Grant; Kier Gist; David Conley; David Townsend; Derrick Culler; Everett Collins	KayGee	4:11
12.	"Illicit Activity" (featuring 8Ball & MJG)	Ennis; Scott; Anthony Johnson; Premro Smith; Marlon Goodwin	Smoke One Productions	5:15
13.	"Killin' Em"	Anthony Johnson; Cullins	Crazy C; DJ Storm	3:35
14.	"One in Tha Chamba" (featuring M.O.P. and Cocoa Brovaz)	Ennis; Scott; Anthony Johnson; Jamal Grinnage; Eric Murray; Darrell Yates; Tekomin Williams	Hangmen 3	4:28
15.	"Quarter Past Nine" (featuring Cool Gsus, M3 and Fuckamon)	Ennis; Scott; Anthony Johnson; Grant; Mike McNeil; Demaine Thomas; Okeke	Hangmen 3	4:32
16.	"We'll Remember You"	Ennis; Scott; Anthony Johnson; B. Wilkins	Doc Doom; Mad House	3:42
Total length:				1:05:53

No.	Title	Writer(s)	Producer(s)	Length
17.	"Didn't Know Her Name"	Ennis; Scott; Ruffin Jr.; J. Jackson	J-Sly

Sample credits

- Track 2 contains samples from "Ain't Nothing I Can Do" performed by Tyrone Davis.
- Track 5 contains samples from "Stormy Weather" performed by Johnnie Taylor.
- Track 6 contains samples from "Voyage to Atlantis" performed by The Isley Brothers.
- Track 7 contains a sample of "No One's Gonna Love You" performed by The S.O.S. Band.
- Track 10 contains a sample from "The Black Five" by Roy Ayers.
- Track 11 contains samples from "You Are My Everything" performed by Surface.

Notes

- Track 17 is available only on cassette versions.

== Personnel ==
- Raymond "Ray Dog" Scott – vocals, keyboards (tracks: 6, 7, 15), producer & mixing (tracks: 5–7, 10, 14, 15), executive producer
- Marco "E-Devious" Ennis – vocals
- Anthony "The Microphone Wrecka Tony Rhome" Johnson – vocals
- Jeffrey "DJ Deff Jeff" Neal – scratches (tracks: 5, 9, 10, 11, 13, 14, 15), producer & mixing (tracks: 5–7, 10, 14, 15)
- Albert "Prodigy" Johnson – vocals (track 3)
- David "D-Ruff" Ruffin Jr. – background vocals (tracks: 4, 17), vocals (track 7)
- Keva Holman – vocals (track 5)
- Antony "Tangg The Juice" Altamirano – vocals (track 6)
- Oswald "Mad Lion" Preece – vocals (track 8)
- Faith Evans – vocals (track 9)
- Anthony "Cool Gsus" Grant – vocals (tracks: 11, 15)
- Premro "8Ball" Smith – vocals (track 12)
- Marlon "MJG" Goodwin – vocals (track 12)
- Jamal "Lil' Fame" Grinnage – vocals (track 14)
- Eric "Billy Danze" Murray – vocals (track 14)
- Darrell A. "Steele" Yates Jr. – vocals (track 14)
- Tekomin B. "Tek" Williams – vocals (track 14)
- "Mass Murderin' Mike" McNeil – vocals (track 15)
- Demaine "Masta Criminal Main-T" Thomas – vocals (track 15)
- Courtney – chorus vocals (track 15)
- Corey Stoot – guitar (tracks: 4, 8, 9)
- Simon "Crazy C" Cullins – keyboards (tracks: 4, 8, 13), producer (tracks: 4, 8, 9, 13)
- Terrence "Bearwolf" Williams – keyboards (tracks: 4, 8, 9), producer (track 4)
- Leo Okeke – keyboards (tracks: 6, 7), bass (tracks: 6, 7, 15), guitar (track 15)
- Roger Tausz – bass (tracks: 14, 16), mixing (tracks: 6, 8, 10, 13, 15), recording (track 16)
- John Bido – producer (track 2)
- Kejuan "Havoc" Muchita – producer (track 3)
- Troy "Pee Wee" Clark – co-producer (track 2)
- John Bynoe – producer & mixing (tracks: 5–7, 10, 14, 15)
- Kier "KayGee" Gist – producer (track 11)
- Smoke One Productions – producer (track 12)
- DJ Storm – producer (track 13)
- Doc Doom – producer (track 16)
- Mad House – producer (track 16)
- J-Sly – producer (track 17)
- Troy Hightower – mixing (tracks: 2, 7, 11, 14)
- Bill Bookheim – engineering (track 2)
- Ken "Duro" Ifill – mixing & recording (track 3)
- Paul Arnold – mixing (tracks: 4, 5, 9, 12, 16, 17)
- Craig Gilmore – recording (tracks: 4, 6–10, 13, 15)
- Steve Souder – recording (track 5)
- Ben Arrindell – recording (tracks: 11, 17)
- Brian Miller – recording (track 14)
- Steve Gerdes – art direction, design
- James A. Smith – executive producer
- David Mays – executive producer

== Charts ==
Chart (1996)	Peak position
US Top R&B Albums (Billboard)	52
