= Bridging the Gap (song) =

2004 single by Nas and Olu Dara

Single by Nas featuring Olu Dara

from the album Street's Disciple and Cadillac Records: Music From the Motion Picture
- Released: October 5, 2004
- Genre: Jazz rap; alternative hip hop
- Length: 3:56
- Label: Ill Will Records; Columbia Records
- Songwriters: Nasir Jones; Salaam Remi; Olu Dara
- Producer: Salaam Remi

Nas featuring Olu Dara singles chronology
"Thief's Theme" (2004)	"Bridging the Gap" (2004)	"Just a Moment" (2005)

"Bridging the Gap" is a single from Nas' Street's Disciple, and features his father, Olu Dara. The second single from Street's Disciple, it samples music from Muddy Waters' "Mannish Boy" composition. Olu Dara provides the hook of the song by talking about his path and how Nas was born.

Nas and Olu Dara performed the song many times before the release of Street's Disciple, generating buzz as the release of the album drew near. The song is referenced in the title track of The Game's song "The Documentary", when he says, "Now I understand why Nas did a song with his pops". The song peaked at #94 on the Billboard Hot 100.

The song was featured in the film A Prophet, directed by Jacques Audiard. It plays over the closing credits of the 2018 action-horror film Overlord.

== Music video ==
The music video was directed by Diane Martel and shows Nas and Olu Dara on a stage with women dancing in the background. It also shows a few shots that are supposed to be Nas in school. At the end of the video, Dara stands still next to Nas and says with a smile, "Rest in peace, Ray Charles," as a sign of respect. (Charles had died in the summer of 2004.) The video had high rotation on MTV and BET.

== Track listing ==
=== A-side ===
1. "Bridging The Gap" (Album Version) (4:00)
2. "Bridging The Gap" (Instrumental) (3:57)
3. "Bridging The Gap" (A Cappella) (3:57)

=== B-side ===
1. "Bridging The Gap" (Album Version) (4:00)
2. "Bridging The Gap" (Instrumental) (3:57)
3. "Bridging The Gap" (A Cappella) (3:57)

== Charts ==
Chart (2004)	Peak position
Ireland (IRMA)	44
Scotland Singles (OCC)	22
UK Hip Hop/R&B (OCC)	8
UK Singles (OCC)	18
US Billboard Hot 100	94
US Hot R&B/Hip-Hop Songs (Billboard)	49

== Release history ==
Region	Date	Format(s)	Label(s)	Ref.
United States	October 18, 2004	Rhythmic contemporary · urban contemporary radio	Columbia	
