= Pretty Girl Bullshit =

Song by Mario Winans featuring Foxy Brown and P. Diddy

from the album Bad Boys II and Hurt No More
- Released: 2003
- Genre: Dirty rap; R&B
- Length: 4:22
- Label: Bad Boy Records; Universal
- Songwriters: Mario Winans; Inga Marchand
- Producer: Mario Winans

"Pretty Girl Bullshit" (censored as "Pretty Girl Bullsh*t") is a R&B song by American singer Mario Winans, featuring American rappers Foxy Brown and P. Diddy. The song first appeared in 2003 on Bad Boys II, the soundtrack to the film of the same name. The following year, it appeared on Winans' second album and major label debut, Hurt No More (2004). Bad Boy Records label boss and the executive producer of both projects, P. Diddy, acts as the song's hype man.

== Content ==
The song is arranged as a sort of dialogue that indicates that Brown's character is the pretty girl whose "bullshit" troubles Winans. Unlike those delivered by Brown, the lyrics sung by Winans do not include profanity; "Take your pretty girl bull" is his harshest phrase.

Brown's rap takes the narrative position of chiding Winans for infidelity and, in particular, for his generosity to other women. She complains that he has "had a hoe rockin' my red gold Cartier on her wrist" and "y'all don't want a girl in Yves Saint Laurent, You'd rather fuck a hoe in a bullshit Gabann'". Characteristically, Brown also makes various boasts which include namechecking Sean Combs, saying that "I'm in Caprice" (perhaps referring to Capri), and bragging "I'm a Bad girl, illest bitch grinding...Sean John Rolls hold chocolate diamonds..."

Winans, in contrast, delivers far less aggressive lyrics in his characteristic R&B style. In the song's intro he sings "I can't live with you" several times. As the song progresses, he expresses doubts about their compatibility singing "What am I to do, when you act a fool" and "What you had in me, too fine to see." By the middle of the song, he is explicitly dismissive of his partner's "pretty girl bull" and sings "...if you wanna go, walk right out that door...If you wanna leave, it's okay with me...Matter of fact I'm begging please."

All three artists add various phrases ad libitum, particularly in the last two choruses.

== Reviews ==
In a generally good review of Hurt No More, a reviewer for Allmusic spoke negatively about this song saying:

Winans doesn't wear the few occurrences of harder-edged material so well -- "Pretty Girl Bullsh*t," featuring an ill-matched verse from Foxy Brown, is particularly out of character and disrupts the lush, sensual flow of the record. A couple minor blunders like that hardly prevent Hurt No More from being one of the finest R&B albums of the year.

Independent reviewers of the Bad Boys II soundtrack on Amazon.com conveyed an equally negative reaction. One called it "another mistake". Another opined that the song "falls under skip material for me." A review for musicOMH.com criticizes the song saying it is...

..an awkward listen with clear West Coast allusions in the beat, which feels completely wrong in the context and delivery of the track.

Another review of Bad Boys II complains:

By the time we get to the rather worryingly title Pretty Girl Bullshit by Marion [sic] Winans and Foxy Brown things are getting rather tired. PGB seems to be about Winans going on about how much he dislikes people like Foxy Brown. That could be wishful thinking though - on my part.

On the other hand, in reviewing Hurt No More Rolling Stone said "Winans nails all the emo cues...[for example] resentment on "Pretty Girl Bullsh*t". The UK website CD Times only comment was that "Pretty Girl Bullshit and This Is The Thanks I Get give the record an edge."
