= Hurt No More =

Album by Mario Winans

Studio album by Mario Winans
- Released: April 20, 2004
- Length: 59:41
- Label: Bad Boy; Universal
- Producer: Mario Winans; Sean Combs

Mario Winans chronology
Story of My Heart (1997)	Hurt No More (2004)

Singles from Hurt No More
- 1. "I Don't Wanna Know" Released: February 17, 2004; 2. "Never Really Was" Released: May 20, 2004; 3. "This Is the Thanks I Get" Released: February 20, 2005

Hurt No More is the second and final studio album by American singer Mario Winans. It was released by Bad Boy Records and Universal Records on April 20, 2004, in the United States. The album was produced by Winans himself, alongside Bad Boy founder Sean Combs, and features guest appearances from Combs, alongside Enya, Slim, Loon, Foxy Brown, and Black Rob. Its lead single, "I Don't Wanna Know" (featuring Enya and P. Diddy) was a commercial success, peaking at number 2 on the Billboard Hot 100 in the United States and peaking at the top of charts worldwide.

The album itself was positively received by music critics and peaked at number 2 on the Billboard 200 in America, alongside topping the UK R&B Albums chart and the Top R&B/Hip-Hop Albums chart, alongside being certified Gold by the Recording Industry Association of America (RIAA) for equivalent sales of 300,000 units in America and Platinum by the British Phonographic Industry (BPI) for equivalent sales of 500,000 units in the country. Two other singles were released for the album, including a version of "Never Really Was" featuring Lil' Flip, and "This Is the Thanks I Get".

== Critical reception ==
Professional ratings
Review scores
Source	Rating
Allmusic	4/5 stars
Blender	3/5 stars
Rolling Stone	2/5 stars
USA Today	3/4 stars
Vibe	3.5/5 stars

Hurt No More received generally positive reviews from music critics. Allmusic editor Andy Kellman called the album "one of the finest R&B albums of the year." He found that while "nothing about Hurt No More is radically exceptional, it is, however, full of small surprises [and] as rich as humbled, sincerely sensitive male R&B gets in 2004." USA Today writer Steve Jones wrote that "in his second solo album, Winans spends much of his time taking the blows from all sorts of bad relationships [...] After years of playing in the background, it seems that the talented Winans is ready for his close-up." Vibe editor Tim Bower called the album a "charming throwback." Jon Caramanica from Rolling Stone rated Hurt No More two out of five starts. He felt that "though his melodies are strong, his lyrics lack punch. And while his voice quivers with hurt, it never achieves true angst, suggesting that even heartbreak can be smoothed over." musicOMH' Azeem Ahmad found that "the album isn't great, and other than "I Don't Wanna Know there" isn't much in the way of mainstream single potential, but that's the nature of the genre. This is a must-have for any R&B fan – anyone else should approach with caution."

== Commercial performance ==
Hurt No More debuted at number two on the US Billboard 200 behind Usher's Confessions (2004), and atop the Top R&B/Hip-Hop Albums chart, selling 223,000 copies in its first week. It also debuted and peaked at number three on the UK Albums Chart. During the week of May 12, 2004, the album entered at number 7 on the Billboard 200, selling 90,000 units. "I Don't Wanna Know" was issued as the album's lead single. Based on a sample of the song "Boadicea" by Irish singer Enya from her 1987 self-titled album which came to prominence on The Fugees track "Ready or Not" from the album The Score (1996), the song features a rap by P. Diddy. "I Don't Wanna Know" was released in early 2004 and became a worldwide hit, reaching number one in Germany and on the US Billboard Rhythmic Top 40, also peaking at number two on the Billboard Hot 100.

== Track listing ==
Hurt No More track listing
No.	Title	Writer(s)	Producer(s)	Length
1.	"Ready for Love (Interlude)"	Mario Winans	Winans	1:35
2.	"Never Really Was"	Winans; Adonis Shropshire; Brian Elliot; Michael Carlos Jones	Winans	4:20
3.	"I Don't Wanna Know" (featuring Enya and P. Diddy)	Winans; Chauncey Hawkins; Enya; Jones; Nicky Ryan; Roma Ryan	Winans	4:17
4.	"You Knew" (featuring Slim)	Winans; Shropshire; Eldra DeBarge; Jack Knight	Winans; Sean Combs	4:44
5.	"How I Made It" (featuring Loon)	Winans; Hawkins; Harold Hudson; Larry Davis; Thomas McClary	Winans	2:59
6.	"Already Know (Interlude)"	Winans	Winans	1:54
7.	"3 Days Ago"	Winans; Jones; Tony Aliperti	Winans	3:37
8.	"What's Wrong with Me"	Winans; Shropshire; Frankie Romano; Knight; Jones	Winans	3:14
9.	"Can't Judge Me"	Winans; Shropshire; Jones	Winans	4:00
10.	"Disbelief"	Winans	Winans	4:46
11.	"Enough (Interlude)"	Winans	Winans	0:58
12.	"Pretty Girl Bullshit" (featuring Foxy Brown)	Winans; Inga Marchand	Winans	4:29
13.	"This Is the Thanks I Get" (featuring Black Rob)	Winans; Robert Ross	Winans	3:40
14.	"I Got You Babe"	Winans; Jones	Winans	3:56
15.	"So Fine"	Winans; Aliperti	Winans	3:22
16.	"Should've Known"	Winans; Jones	Winans	3:46
17.	"Turn Around"	Winans; Shropshire; Knight	Winans	4:04
Total length:				59:41

UK/Japan release bonus track
No.	Title	Writer(s)	Producer(s)	Length
18.	"The Game"	Winans; Jones	Winans	3:57
Total length:				63:38

=== Sample credits ===
- "Never Really Was" contains a sample from the composition "Papa Don't Preach" as performed by Madonna.
- "I Don't Wanna Know" contains elements from the song "Story of Boadicea" by Enya.
- "You Knew" contains excerpts from the composition "Love Me in a Special Way" as performed by DeBarge.
- "How I Made It" contains excerpts from the composition "Celebrate" as performed by The Commodores.

== Charts ==
=== Weekly charts ===
Weekly chart performance for Hurt No More
Chart (2004)	Peak position
Australian Albums (ARIA)	37
Australian Urban Albums (ARIA)	6
Austrian Albums (Ö3 Austria)	62
Belgian Albums (Ultratop Flanders)	94
Belgian Albums (Ultratop Wallonia)	83
Canadian Albums (Nielsen SoundScan)	15
Canadian R&B Albums (Nielsen SoundScan)	7
Danish Albums (Hitlisten)	27
Dutch Albums (Album Top 100)	28
French Albums (SNEP)	22
German Albums (Offizielle Top 100)	6
Irish Albums (IRMA)	37
Italian Albums (FIMI)	42
New Zealand Albums (RMNZ)	33
Scottish Albums (OCC)	12
Swiss Albums (Schweizer Hitparade)	13
UK Albums (OCC)	3
UK R&B Albums (OCC)	1
US Billboard 200	2
US Top R&B/Hip-Hop Albums (Billboard)	1

=== Year-end charts ===
Year-end chart performance for Hurt No More
Chart (2004)	Position
UK Albums (OCC)	55
US Billboard 200	85
US Top R&B/Hip-Hop Albums (Billboard)	31

== Certifications and sales ==
Certifications for Hurt No More
Region	Certification	Certified units/sales
United Kingdom (BPI)	Platinum	300,000^{^}
United States (RIAA)	Gold	500,000^{^}
^{^} Shipments figures based on certification alone.
