= It's Just Begun =

Studio album by Jimmy Castor Bunch
- Released: 1972
- Recorded: 1970–71
- Genre: Funk
- Length: 34:30
- Label: RCA
- Producer: Castor-Pruitt Productions

Jimmy Castor Bunch chronology
It's Just Begun (1972)	Phase Two (1972)

Singles from It's Just Begun
- 1. "It's Just Begun" Released: 1970; 2. "Troglodyte (Cave Man)" Released: April 12, 1972

It's Just Begun is the second album by the Jimmy Castor Bunch, released in 1972 on RCA Records. Title track "It's Just Begun" and "Troglodyte (Cave Man)" have each become staples in hip-hop sampling, with the former becoming a B-Boy staple. Songs from the album have been sampled more than 100 times. The song is considered by some to be one of the first disco songs.

The album hit #11 on the R&B charts and #27 on the Billboard 200. "Troglodyte (Cave Man)" hit #6 on the Billboard Hot 100 and #4 R&B.

"Troglodyte (Cave Man)" has made its impact felt as well, making its way onto more than 20 compilation albums, ranging from 16 Slabs of Funk to Greatest Soul Groups.

== Reception ==
Music database AllMusic gave the record a 3-star rating, stating that "It's Just Begun is an important and influential release from a sadly underrated group and well worth a listen for anyone interested in the roots of 1970s funk."

Professional ratings
Review scores
Source	Rating
AllMusic	3/5 stars

== Track listing ==
1. "Creation (Prologue)" (Gerry Thomas) - 1:34
2. "It's Just Begun" (Gerry Thomas, Jimmy Castor, John Pruitt) - 3:43
3. "Troglodyte (Cave Man)" (Jimmy Castor Bunch) - 3:36
4. "You Better Be Good (Or the Devil Gon' Getcha)" (Gerry Thomas, Jimmy Castor, John Pruitt) - 2:56
5. "Psyche" (Jimmy Castor Bunch) - 4:25
6. "L.T.D. (Life, Truth and Death)" (Gerry Thomas, Curtis Knight) - 7:20
7. "My Brightest Day" (Gerry Thomas, Jimmy Castor, John Pruitt) - 4:03
8. "Bad" (Gerry Thomas, Jimmy Castor, John Pruitt, Doug Gibson) - 3:04
9. "I Promise to Remember" (Jimmy Castor, Jimmy Smith) - 2:47
10. "Creation (Epilogue)" (Gerry Thomas) - 1:02

== Personnel ==
The Jimmy Castor Bunch

- Jimmy Castor - Saxophone, Timbales, Vocals
- Doug Gibson - Bass, Backing Vocals
- Harry Jensen - Guitar
- Lenny Fridie, Jr. - Congas
- Gerry Thomas - Trumpet, Piano
- Orchestra of 30 musicians in "Creation" (Prologue and Epilogue)

== Charts ==
Year	Album	Chart positions		
Year	Album	US	US R&B	Canada
1972	It's Just Begun	27	11	21

=== Singles ===
Year	Single	Chart positions			
Year	Single	US	US R&B	US Dance	Canada
1972	"Troglodyte (Cave Man)"	6	4	—	1
