= You Could Be My Boo =

Single by The Almighty RSO featuring Faith Evans

from the album Doomsday: Forever RSO
- B-side: "Sanity"
- Released: 1996
- Recorded: 1996
- Genre: Hip hop
- Length: 4:47
- Label: Rap-a-Lot
- Producers: Crazy C, Corey"Funkafangez" Stoot and Terance "Bearwolf" Williams

The Almighty RSO singles chronology
"War's On" (1996)	"You Could Be My Boo" (1996)

Faith Evans singles chronology
"Come Over" (1996)	"You Could Be My Boo" (1996)	"Stressed Out" (1996)

"You Could Be My Boo" is the lead single from The Almighty RSO's second album, Doomsday: Forever RSO. It was produced by Crazy C and featured R&B singer Faith Evans. "You Could Be My Boo" became Almighty RSO's only charting single, having made it to #49 on the Hot R&B/Hip-Hop Singles & Tracks and #10 on the Hot Rap Singles. The song used a sample of Yo-Yo's verse the remix version of "I Wanna Be Down (Human Rhythm Hip Hop Remix)" by Brandy, which features MC Lyte, Queen Latifah and Yo-Yo herself, which was released two years earlier.

== Single track listing ==
=== A-Side ===
1. "You Could Be My Boo" (Clean Edit)- 4:14
2. "You Could Be My Boo" (Instrumental)- 4:37

=== B-Side ===
1. "Sanity" (LP Version)- 4:48
2. "Sanity" (Instrumental)- 4:46
