= Arch Nemesis =

Studio album by Benzino
- Released: February 22, 2005
- Recorded: 2004–2005
- Genre: Hardcore hip hop
- Label: ZNO Records
- Producer: Benzino (exec.); David Mays (exec.); Diego Morales; Gizz; Hangmen 3; L.E.S.; M. Brown; Nomad; Reefa; Scott Storch; S. Joyner; StreetRunner; The Beat Brokers; Troy Bell; Vincent Herbert

Benzino chronology
Redemption (2003)	Arch Nemesis (2005)	The Antidote (2007)

Singles from Arch Nemesis
- 1. "Look into My Eyes" Released: 2005

Professional ratings
Review scores
Source	Rating
AllMusic	2/5 stars
Entertainment Weekly	C−
RapReviews	6.5/10

Arch Nemesis is the third solo studio album by American rapper and record producer Benzino. It was released independently on February 22, 2005, via ZNO Records. Production was handled mostly by Benzino's production team Hangmen 3, as well as Reefa, Diego Morales, Gizz, L.E.S., M. Brown, Nomad, Scott Storch, S. Joyner, StreetRunner, the Beat Brokers, Troy Bell and Vincent Herbert. It features guest appearances from the Untouchables, 2Pac, 3 Down, Ekko, Faheim, Freddie Foxxx, Gambino, Huddy, Lil' Jon, Miss Lilli, Scarface, Yaga & Mackie. The album peaked at number 117 on the Billboard 200, number 39 on the Top R&B/Hip-Hop Albums, number 19 on the Rap Albums and number 12 on the Independent Albums.

It spawned a few promotional singles, including “Look Into My Eyes”, which responded with lyrics and an accompanying music video to Eminem's “Like Toy Soldiers” during then lull of their ongoing feud. The album also contains a song “Trying to Make It Through”, which brought the long lost 2Pac verse taken from Freddie Foxxx's 1994 song "Don't Fuck wit a Killa" off of his shelved album Crazy Like a Foxxx. The song "Noche de Estrellas" uses as same beat as "Hoola Hoop" from Redemption. The bonus song "Last Days Calling" is arranged in heavy metal genre.

== Track listing ==
No.	Title	Producer(s)	Length
1.	"Intro"	Hangmen 3
2.	"It's Nuthin'"	Reefa
3.	"On My Mind" (featuring the Untouchables)	M. Brown; S. Joyner
4.	"Bottles & Up (Thug da Club)"	Scott Storch
5.	"U Can't Handle It"	Hangmen 3
6.	"Numb" (Skit)	Hangmen 3
7.	"Look Into My Eyes" (featuring Troy Bell)	Troy Bell
8.	"News Flash" (Skit)	Hangmen 3
9.	"Arch Nemesis (Wish a Nigga Would)"	Hangmen 3
10.	"What's Really Good" (featuring Scarface and Young Hardy)	L.E.S.
11.	"Wide Body" (featuring Faheim)	The Beat Brokers
12.	"Dat's How It Goes" (featuring Gambino, Lil' Jon and Young Hardy)	Nomad
13.	"2Pac" (Intro)	Hangmen 3
14.	"Trying to Make It Through" (featuring 2Pac and Freddie Foxxx)	Reefa
15.	"Ride" (Skit)	Hangmen 3
16.	"Front Back (Side to Side)" (featuring Huddy 6 and Young Lo)	Diego Morales
17.	"Sorry" (Skit)	Hangmen 3
18.	"Not Me" (featuring Miss Lilli)	Hangmen 3
19.	"Noche de Estrellas" (featuring Ekko, Yaga & Mackie)	Gizz
20.	"Diamond Girl"	StreetRunner
21.	"JB Floatin'" (Skit)	Hangmen 3
22.	"World Famous" (featuring 3 Down)	Hangmen 3
23.	"Killa" (featuring the Untouchables)	Vincent Herbert
24.	"Last Days Calling" (Bonus track)	Hangmen 3

== Charts ==
Chart (2005)	Peak position
US Billboard 200	117
US Top R&B/Hip-Hop Albums (Billboard)	39
US Top Rap Albums (Billboard)	19
US Independent Albums (Billboard)	12
