= Just a Moment (song) =

Single by Nas featuring Quan

from the album Street's Disciple
- B-side: "These are Our Heroes"
- Released: February 22, 2005
- Recorded: 2004
- Genre: Hip hop
- Length: 4:23
- Label: Ill Will, Columbia; 44 71538
- Songwriters: Nasir Jones; Clifford Peacock; Nile Rodgers; Bernard Edwards
- Producer: L.E.S.

Nas singles chronology
"Bridging the Gap" (2004)	"Just a Moment" (2005)	"In Public" (2005)

"Just a Moment" is the third and final single from Nas' seventh studio album Street's Disciple. It features his protégé Quan and is produced by L.E.S. Its lyrics ask for moments of silence for many people worldwide who are going through different life struggles, from victims of violence in the ghetto to soldiers in Iraq.

It contains a sample from “Will You Cry (When You Hear this Song)?” by Chic that was used similarly in "Hear the Song" by Freeway.

== Music video ==
The video features an urban surrounding and many reminders of deceased emcees and contemporary R&B singers through empty rooms, wind, and liquor being poured out in a gesture of respect and remembrance.

Nas mentions both Islam and Christianity as ways for one to have or regain faith, as Nas considers himself a spiritual and faithful person, yet doesn't make it clear which religion he associates himself with. Nas also mentions his own mother, saying, "Mommy, I'm still here, wishing I was there with you..." Quan mentions his fallen friends and his promise of taking care of his sister's child, while she is in Iraq. The video version of the song also interprets a change in the fact that the third verse (originally Quan) was changed to having Nas put in an additional rhyme replacing the end of the third verse. This is contrary to the album version of the song, where Quan rhymes the whole third verse.

== Charts ==
Chart (2005)	Peak position
US Bubbling Under Hot 100 (Billboard)	17
US Hot R&B/Hip-Hop Songs (Billboard)	52
US Hot Rap Songs (Billboard)	24
