= The Bertha Butt Boogie =

1975 single by Jimmy Castor

- single cover artwork

Single by Jimmy Castor Bunch

from the album Butt of Course
- B-side: "The Bertha Butt Boogie, Part 2"; (instrumental track of Part 1)
- Released: February 1975
- Genre: Funk
- Length: 3:10
- Label: Atlantic
- Songwriters: Jimmy Castor, Johnny L Pruitt

Jimmy Castor Bunch singles chronology
"Soul Serenade" (1975)	"The Bertha Butt Boogie" (1975)	"Potential" (1975)

Alternative cover

"The Bertha Butt Boogie" is a 1975 song by the Jimmy Castor Bunch. It achieved a No. 16 placing on the US pop chart and reached No. 22 on the US R&B chart. It was also a top 40 hit in Canada.

The record was a follow-up to the band's 1972 top 10 hit "Troglodyte (Cave Man)", which also featured the "Bertha Butt" character, who showed up on several more Jimmy Castor Bunch tracks in following years; it also calls back to two previous Castor recordings, "Hey Leroy Your Mama's Calling You" and "Luther the Anthropoid (Ape Man)", who appear with the troglodyte midway through the song to boogie with the Butt sisters. It has been described by one critic as "another self-defining hit" for the band, and by another as the "seminal narrative" of "celebratory butt songs" in the same vein as similarly themed records such as "Da Butt", "Rump Shaker", and "Baby Got Back".

The song is considered an icon of black music, bringing humor into the larger narrative that emerged in the mid-seventies.

== Chart history ==
Chart (1975)	Peak position
Canada RPM Top Singles	30
U.S. Billboard Hot 100	16
U.S. Billboard R&B	22
U.S. Cash Box Top 100	21
