= Jimmy Castor =

American funk saxophonist (1940–2012)

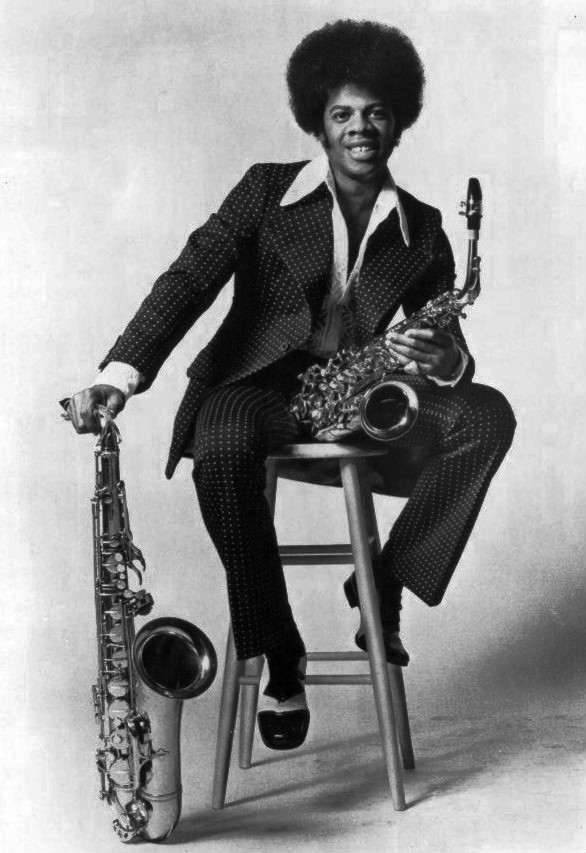
- Castor in 1972

Background information
- Also known as: E-MAN, The Everything Man, The Jimmy Castor Bunch
- Born: James Walter Castor; June 23, 1940^{[n1]} Manhattan, New York, U.S.
- Died: January 16, 2012 (aged 71) Henderson, Nevada, U.S.
- Genres: Soul; R&B; funk
- Instruments: Vocals; saxophone; percussion

James Walter Castor (June 23, 1940^{[n1]} – January 16, 2012) was an American funk, R&B and soul musician. He is credited with vocals, saxophone and composition. He is best known for songs such as "It's Just Begun", "The Bertha Butt Boogie", and his biggest hit single, the million-seller "Troglodyte (Cave Man)." Castor has been described as "one of the most sampled artists in music history" by the BBC.

== Musical career ==
He was born in Manhattan, New York, United States. He started a group called Jimmy and the Juniors, who in 1956 recorded the original version of "I Promise to Remember", which according to Castor Mercury Records did not want to promote. George Goldner had the famous doo-wop group The Teenagers record it and it became their third hit single. Later, Castor was asked to join the Teenagers. In late 1966, he released "Hey Leroy, Your Mama's Callin' You".

As a solo artist and leader of The Jimmy Castor Bunch (TJCB) in the 1970s, Castor released several successful albums and singles. TJCB hit their commercial peak in 1972 upon the release of their album It's Just Begun, which featured two hit singles: the title track and "Troglodyte (Cave Man)", the latter of which became quite popular in the US, hitting #6 on the Billboard Hot 100. The track stayed on the chart for 14 weeks and on June 30, 1972, received a gold disc award from the RIAA for sales of a million copies. Castor released "It's Just Begun" in 1972. In 1973, he recorded a soprano saxophone instrumental cover of "A Whiter Shade of Pale" written by Gary Brooker, Keith Reid and Matthew Fisher (from Procol Harum), on a tune inspired by J.S.Bach's Orchestral Suite No. 3 BWV1068 in his "Air on the G string". Afrika Bambaataa said that "It's Just Begun" was very popular at South Bronx block parties in the 1970s. Later popular songs included "Bertha Butt Boogie", "Potential", "King Kong" and "A Groove Will Make You Move" in 1975 and 1976.

The Jimmy Castor Bunch included keyboardist/trumpeter Gerry Thomas, bassist Douglas Gibson, guitarist Harry Jensen, guitarist / sitarist Jeffrey Grimes, conga and triangle player Lenny Fridie, Jr., and drummers Elwood Henderson, Jr., and Bobby Manigault. Thomas also recorded with the Fatback Band, leaving TJCB in the 1980s to exclusively record with them.

== Death and legacy ==
Castor died of heart failure on January 16, 2012, in Henderson, Nevada.

Many of the group's tunes have been heavily sampled in films and in hip-hop. In particular, the saxophone hook and groove from the title track of "It's Just Begun". For example Ice-T sampled the track for the title track of his 1988 album Power. Also, heavy sampled is the spoken word intro and groove from "Troglodyte (Cave Man)" (namely, "What we're gonna do right here is go back, way back, back into time..." and "Gotta find a woman, gotta find a woman"). Industrial hip hop group Tackhead covered the song "Just Begun" for the digital release of their album For the Love of Money.

== Family ==
Castor's son, J-Cast, chose his stage name by using letters from Jimmy "J" and Castor "Cast". J-Cast released an album, J-Cast for President, on June 24, 2009, which was popular in Japan. Jimmy had three other children: April, Jimmy Jr., and Sheli, and ten grandchildren.

== Discography ==
=== Albums ===
Year	Album	Chart positions			Label
Year	Album	US Pop	US R&B	CAN	Label
1967	Hey Leroy	–	–	–	Smash
1972	It's Just Begun	27	11	21	RCA
1972	Phase 2	192	–	–	RCA
1973	Dimension 3	–	49	–	RCA
1974	The Jimmy Castor Bunch featuring the Everything Man	–	–	–	Atlantic
1975	Butt of Course...	74	34	–	Atlantic
1975	Supersound	–	30	–	Atlantic
1976	E-Man Groovin'	132	29	–	Atlantic
1977	Maximum Stimulation	–	–	–	Atlantic
1978	Let It Out	–	–	–	Drive/TK Records
1979	The Jimmy Castor Bunch	–	–	–	Cotillion/Atlantic
1980	C	–	–	–	Long Distance
1983	The Return of Leroy	–	–	–	Dream
1995	The Everything Man–The Best of the Jimmy Castor Bunch	–	–	–	Rhino
"—" denotes releases that did not chart.

=== Chart singles ===
Note: All credited to The Jimmy Castor Bunch unless otherwise stated.

Year	Single	Chart positions			
Year	Single	US Pop	US R&B	AUS	CAN
1966	"Hey, Leroy, Your Mama's Callin' You"; Jimmy Castor	31	16	–	36
1972	"Troglodyte (Cave Man)"	6	4	13	1
1972	"Luther the Anthropoid (Ape Man)"	105	–	–	–
1973	"A Whiter Shade of Pale"	–	–	–	–
1975	"Soul Serenade"	–	72	–	–
1975	"The Bertha Butt Boogie (pt.1)"	16	22	–	30
1975	"Potential"	–	25	–	–
1975	"King Kong – Part 1"	69	23	–	–
1976	"Supersound"	–	42	–	–
1976	"Bom Bom"	–	97	–	–
1976	"Everything Is Beautiful to Me"	–	67	–	–
1977	"Space Age"	101	28	–	–
1977	"I Love a Mellow Groove"	108	–	–	–
1978	"Maximum Stimulation"	–	82	–	–
1979	"Don't Do That!"	–	50	–	–
1980	"Can't Help Falling in Love with You"; Jimmy Castor	–	93	–	–
1984	"Amazon"; Jimmy Castor	–	84	–	–
1985	"It Gets to Me"; Jimmy Castor	–	81	–	–
1988	"Love Makes a Woman"; Joyce Sims feat. Jimmy Castor	–	29	–	–
"–" denotes releases that did not chart or were not released in that territory.

== Notes ==
- ^[n1]Note: Some other sources give different years of birth, between 1943 and 1947, though an obituary from The New York Times states: "James Walter Castor was born on June 23, 1940, in Manhattan. (His son said that for years he had let others assume he was far younger than he was, by as much as seven years.)"
