= Rock the Party (Benzino song) =

2002 single by Benzino featuring Mario Winans

Single by Benzino featuring Mario Winans

from the album Redemption
- Released: September 3, 2002
- Recorded: 2002
- Studio: Planet 2 Planet (New York City, New York)
- Genre: Hip hop
- Length: 3:47
- Label: Elektra
- Songwriters: Raymond Scott; Mario Winans; Michael Carlos Jones
- Producer: Mario "Yellowman" Winans

Benzino singles chronology
"Boottee" (2001)	"Rock the Party" (2002)	"Would You" (2003)

Mario Winans singles chronology
"I Need a Girl (Part Two)" (2002)	"Rock the Party" (2003)	"Down for Me" (2003)

Music video
- "Rock The Party" on YouTube

"Rock the Party" is a song written and performed by American rapper Raymond "Benzino" Scott and featuring singer-songwriter Mario "Yellowman" Winans. It was released on September 3, 2002, via Elektra Records as the lead single from Benzino's second solo studio album Redemption. Recording sessions took place at Planet 2 Planet in New York with Wayne Allison. Production was handled by Winans. It was mixed by Paul Logus at the Hit Factory Criteria in Miami and mastered by Chris Gehringer at Sterling Sound in New York. Young Heff remixed version featured guest verses from Lil' Kim and Petey Pablo.

The song peaked at number 82 on the Billboard Hot 100, number 28 on the Hot R&B/Hip-Hop Songs, and number 31 on the Rhythmic Airplay, marking it Benzino's highest charted single to date. The song also appeared on the US version of The Transporter: Music from and Inspired by the Motion Picture, and later was featured in the 2002 film I-SPY and the 2003 video game NBA Street Vol. 2.

== Track listing ==
All tracks are written by Raymond Scott and Mario Winans.

2002 US 12" single
No.	Title	Length
1.	"Rock the Party" (main version)
2.	"Rock the Party" (instrumental)
3.	"Rock the Party" (T.V. track)
4.	"Rock the Party" (a cappella)

2003 UK and Europe CD single
No.	Title	Writer(s)	Producer(s)	Length
1.	"Rock the Party" (featuring Mario Winans; radio version)	Raymond Scott; Mario Winans; Michael Carlos Jones	Mario "Yellowman" Winans	4:09
2.	"Rock the Party" (featuring Mario Winans, Lil' Kim and Petey Pablo; Young Heff remix amended version)	Scott; Winans; M. Jones; Kimberly Jones; Moses Barrett III	Mario "Yellowman" Winans	4:01
3.	"Pull Your Skirt Up" (amended version)	Scott; Anthony Gilmour	Tone Capone	3:57

2003 UK 12" single
No.	Title	Writer(s)	Producer(s)	Length
1.	"Rock the Party" (featuring Mario Winans; radio version)	Raymond Scott; Mario Winans; Michael Carlos Jones	Mario "Yellowman" Winans	4:10
2.	"Rock the Party" (featuring Mario Winans, Lil' Kim and Petey Pablo; Young Heff remix amended version)	Scott; Winans; M. Jones; Kimberly Jones; Moses Barrett III	Mario "Yellowman" Winans	4:02
3.	"Rock the Party" (featuring Mario Winans; album version)	Scott; Winans; M. Jones	Mario "Yellowman" Winans	4:10
4.	"Rock the Party" (instrumental)	Scott; Winans; M. Jones	Mario "Yellowman" Winans	4:09
5.	"Pull Your Skirt Up" (amended version)	Scott; Anthony Gilmour	Tone Capone	3:56

== Personnel ==
- Raymond "Benzino" Scott – main artist, songwriter
- Mario Winans – featured artist, songwriter, producer
- Michael Carlos Jones – songwriter
- Wayne "The Brain" Allison – recording
- Paul Logus – mixing
- Chris Gehringer – mastering

== Charts ==
Chart performance for "Rock the Party"
Chart (2002–2003)	Peak position
UK Hip Hop/R&B (Official Charts)	27
US Billboard Hot 100	82
US Hot R&B/Hip-Hop Songs (Billboard)	28
US Hot Rap Songs (Billboard)	20
US Rhythmic Airplay (Billboard)	31
