= Classic Limited Edition =

Studio album by Made Men
- Released: August 24, 1999
- Recorded: 1998–1999
- Genre: East Coast hip hop; mafioso rap
- Length: 1:13:46
- Label: Restless
- Producer: Dame Grease; Daz Dillinger; Deric "D-Dot" Angelettie; Hangmen 3; Kanye West; L.E.S.; Trackmasters; Vincent Herbert

Professional ratings
Review scores
Source	Rating
AllMusic	4/5 stars
Rolling Stone	3/5 stars
The Source	4.5/5 stars

Classic Limited Edition is the only studio album by American hip hop group Made Men. It was released on August 24, 1999, through Restless Records. The production was handled mostly by the group's production team Hangmen 3, alongside Deric "D-Dot" Angelettie, Kanye West, L.E.S., Dame Grease, Daz Dillinger, Trackmasters and Vincent Herbert. It features guest appearances from Wiseguys, Big Pun, Big Tray Deee, Cardan, Mase, Master P, Monifah, Montell Jordan, Queen Pen, Tha Dogg Pound and the Lox. The album peaked at No. 61 on the Billboard 200 and No. 9 on the Billboard Top R&B/Hip-Hop Albums chart.

== Album review controversy ==
The Source's review of Classic Limited Edition caused a controversy. The magazine, at the time controlled by the owner's friend and a member of the Made Men rapper Benzino, gave Classic Limited Edition four-and-a-half out of five "mics" rating. The reviewer was later revealed to be fictitious. Benzino also demanded from Selwyn Seyfu Hinds, then editor-in-chief of The Source, to publish a cover story dedicated to the Made Men. After a heated argument, Hinds refused to publish it and subsequently resigned.

== Track listing ==
No.	Title	Writer(s)	Producer(s)	Length
1.	"Benzino's Thoughts" (Interlude)	R. Scott	Hangmen 3	2:05
2.	"Just You and I"	R. Scott; M. Ennis; A. Grant	Deric "D-Dot" Angelettie; Kanye West	3:51
3.	"Da Interview" (Interlude)			0:56
4.	"Is It You? (Déjà Vu)" (featuring Master P)	R. Scott; M. Ennis; A. Grant	Hangmen 3	3:23
5.	"Vincent's Nightclub" (Interlude)			0:27
6.	"Keep It Movin'"	M. Ennis	Hangmen 3	3:21
7.	"No Matter What"	R. Scott; M. Ennis; A. Grant; A. Burns	Dame Grease	3:29
8.	"Frank's Place 1" (Interlude)			0:37
9.	"Wise Guys for Life" (featuring Man Terror)	R. Scott; M. Ennis; A. Grant; O. Hairston	L.E.S.; Trackmasters	3:34
10.	"Classic Limited Edition"	R. Scott; M. Ennis; A. Grant	L.E.S.	3:08
11.	"Tommy's Theme" (featuring the Lox)	R. Scott; M. Ennis; A. Grant; D. Styles; J. Phillips; S. Jacobs	Hangmen 3	4:13
12.	"Blowin' Circles in the Wind"	R. Scott; M. Ennis; A. Grant	Hangmen 3	3:55
13.	"Frank's Place 2" (Interlude)			0:35
14.	"Sticky Situation" (featuring Montell Jordan)	M. Ennis; A. Grant	Hangmen 3; Vincent Herbert	4:08
15.	"Is It You? (Déjà Vu) (Remix)" (featuring Big Pun, Cardan and Mase)	R. Scott; M. Ennis; A. Grant; C. Rios; M. Betha; P. Jones	Kanye West; Deric "D-Dot" Angelettie	3:41
16.	"Right Now"	R. Scott; M. Ennis; A. Grant; I. Washington	Hangmen 3	3:33
17.	"Drama Still" (featuring Mike McNeil)	R. Scott; M. Ennis; A. Grant; M. McNeil	Hangmen 3	3:05
18.	"Must Be Love" (featuring Tangg the Juice)	M. Ennis; A. Grant; A. Altamirano	Hangmen 3	3:47
19.	"I Wanna Made Man"	M. Ennis; A. Grant	Hangmen 3	3:19
20.	"3 Stripe Killaz"	R. Scott; M. Ennis; A. Grant	Hangmen 3	3:10
21.	"Snake Move" (Interlude)			0:38
22.	"Not the One (That Bitch Is Done)" (featuring Monifah and Queen Pen)	R. Scott; M. Ennis; A. Grant; L. Walters	Hangmen 3	4:31
23.	"Clockin' C Notes" (featuring Tray Deee and Tha Dogg Pound)	R. Scott; M. Ennis; A. Grant; D. Arnaud; T. Davis	Daz Dillinger	4:25
24.	"15 Years In"	R. Scott; A. Grant	Hangmen 3	2:11
25.	"Cold Hearted" (featuring Wiseguys)	M. Ennis; A. Altamirano; J. Stanley; M. McNeil; O. Hairston	Hangmen 3	3:44
Total length:				1:13:46

== Charts ==
Chart (1999)	Peak position
US Billboard 200	61
US Top R&B/Hip-Hop Albums (Billboard)	9
