= Quan (rapper) =

American rapper (born 1978)

- Also known as: Don Ferquan, Q.U.A.N.
- Born: Clifford Ferquan Peacock; May 3, 1978 (age 48); Bridgeport, Connecticut
- Origin: Newport News, Virginia
- Genres: Hip hop, mafioso rap
- Occupations: Rapper, Singer
- Years active: 2003–present
- Labels: Kingz Nation, Ill Will, Fort Knocks, Atlantic

Clifford Ferquan Peacock (born May 3, 1978) better known by his stage name Quan or Don Ferquan, is an American rapper affiliated with Nas and Ill Will Records. In 2008, he signed with Just Blaze label Fort Knocks as a joint venture with Ill Will. He is currently signed to Amalgam Digital, who distributed his album Walking Testimony in 2009.

== Biography ==
Nas signed Quan to his Ill Will record label, and featured him on "Just a Moment", the third single from his 2004 Street's Disciple album. The album was a critical success for Nas, and Quan's heartfelt verse earned him respect from the hip-hop community at large. He later contributed to songs for the albums of both Cassidy and Jeannie Ortega.

In 2004, Quan began recording material for his debut album, titled Until My Death. The idea of the album's title came about when Quan recalled: "I got this phrase tattooed across my back when I was a younger. It symbolized a change for me, cause I knew that had I not chose to do something different, the result was gonna be just that — Death. I had come too close, too many times, for God to just keep given me chances." The debut to date has yielded only one official single titled "All for War," which featured production by Mike Wonder and L.E.S. Additionally, the debut album was slated to feature guest appearances by the likes of Nas, Cassidy, The Neptunes and Missy Elliott, however the project was "temporarily" shelved in 2011. Quan confirmed in multiple interviews that he was saving the project for a "major" release and revealed that over the number of years that he had recorded over 400 tracks for the album. In 2008, after meeting producer Just Blaze at a party at a club in Manhattan they got talking and decided to do a joint venture with his label Fort Knocks Entertainment & Nas label Ill Will Records. In 2009, Quan released the album Walking Testimony which served as an "appetizer" for Until My Death.

He has since then continued recording for the mixtape circuit all the while preparing his follow-up album, Glorious Struggle.

Now in 2013 Quan stated he has a music catalog of around 500 songs. He said at this time "get away" which was a song from his "The Struggle" mixtape was the record that he performed the best on.

== Ill Will Records & Relationship With Nas ==
When asked about his current relation with his former employers Quan said "Me and a few people are still in touch and cool. Its no beef, we just ain't see eye to eye on a few things, shit happens life goes on. I have a few regrets, and I would've did a few things different, but again life goes on. In life you can't change or control anyone but yourself. I wish homie the best....new life, new music, new management, new money! I would sign with a major again....but it would have to be on me n my teams terms...."

== Discography ==
=== Albums ===
- 2005: "Until my Death" (not yet released)
- 2009: Walking Testimony
- TBA: Glorious Struggle (not yet released)
- 2016: Point Of No Return

=== Mixtapes ===
- The Don Fer Quan Show
- Most Anticipated
- Long Time Coming Volume 1
- Black Gangsta
- Carrying The Tradition
- The Struggle, Pt. 1
- "www.donferquan.com"

=== Singles ===
- 2004: "Just a Moment" (Nas feat. Quan)
- 2004: "All for War" (DONFERQUAN SHOW mixtape)
- 2005: "Simply Riding" DONFERQUAN SHOW mixtape
- 2005: "Q.U.A.N." DONFERQUAN SHOW mixtape
- 2006: "TREACHEROUS" LONG TIME COMING VOL 1 MIXTAPE dj whookid
- 2006: "like who?"LONG TIME COMING VOL 1 MIXTAPE dj whookid
- 2006: "Good when I'm not" Black Gangster mixtape dj red devil
- 2007: "Criminal minded" MOST ANTICIPATED MIXTAPE dj p cutta
- 2007: " G-CALL " MOST ANTICIPATED MIXTAPE
- 2008: "Streets Keep Calling" Walking Testimony lp
- 2009:" Gettin Money" feat Nas Walking Testimony lp
- 2011: "I Do It" (prod. Nottz)the struggle mixtape
- 2011: "Feel So Good" (prod. Jake One)the struggle mixtape
- 2012: "Get Away" prod by Nottz the struggle mixtape
- 2012: "Never Gonna Stop" (Mind the Gap Feat. Quan)
- 2013: " itz not a game"
- 2014: "ALL ON HIM" Feat. Pusha T off QUAN's www.donferquan.com mixtape
- 2014: "17" feat Emilio Rojas off QUAN's www.donferquan.com mixtape
- 2015: "Pocket Fulla" feat ACE HOOD off QUAN's www.donferquan.com mixtape
- 2016: "So see thru" feat Joe Scudda & Rapper Pooh

=== Guest appearances ===
- 2005: "Can't Fade Me" (from the Cassidy album I'm a Hustla)
- 2006: "Can U?" (from the Jeannie Ortega album No Place Like BKLYN)
- 2008: "Amerikkkaz pie" featured on HBO "the wire"
- 2009: "where ta find me" Saigon feat QUAN
- 2008: "Losing My Mind" (from the Bizarre (rapper) mixtape Liquor, Weed and Food Stamps)
- 2011: "The Beauty of Death" (from the [dead] P.o.e.t.s. album Front Toward Enemy)
- 2011: "Summertime" (by Asher Roth prod by Nottz)
- 2013: "Never gonna stop" Mind the Gap feat QUAN : GENERATION IRON MOVIE
- 2014: "ALL ON HIM" Feat. Pusha T off QUAN's www.donferquan.com mixtape
- 2014: "17" feat Emilio Rojas off QUAN's www.donferquan.com mixtape
- 2015: "Pocket Fulla" feat ACE HOOD off QUAN's www.donferquan.com mixtape
- 2016: "So see thru" feat Joe Scudda & Rapper Pooh
