= Mario Winans =

American singer

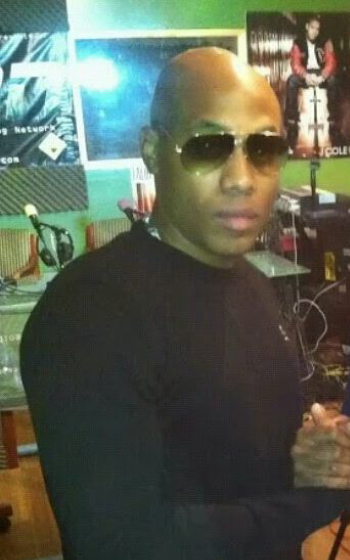
- Winans in 2014

Background information
- Also known as: Yellowman; Skeeter
- Born: Mario Mendell Brown; August 29, 1974 (age 52); Orangeburg, South Carolina, U.S.
- Genre: R&B
- Occupations: Singer; songwriter; record producer
- Instruments: Vocals; keyboards; piano; bass guitar; drums; sampler
- Years active: 1988–present
- Labels: Bad Boy; Undeas; Worldwide; Atlantic; Universal; Motown
- Member of: Winans family; The Hitmen

Mario Mendell Winans (né Brown; born August 29, 1974) is an American R&B singer, songwriter, and record producer from South Carolina. A member of the Winans musical family, he is best known for his 2004 single "I Don't Wanna Know" (featuring Enya and P. Diddy), which peaked at number two on the Billboard Hot 100.

In the early 1990s, Winans signed with Dallas Austin's Rowdy Records as an in-house producer and received early credits on R. Kelly's self-titled second album (1995) and Pebbles' Straight from My Heart (1995). He later signed with Motown to release his debut studio album, Story of My Heart (1997), which was commercially unsuccessful. After contributing to Diddy's 1998 single "Come with Me," Winans subsequently joined Bad Boy Records' production team, the Hitmen. He also appeared on Diddy's 2000 single "Best Friend" and his 2002 single "I Need a Girl (Part Two)," both of which entered the Billboard Hot 100, with the latter peaking at number four. He then signed with Bad Boy, an imprint of Universal Records, as a solo artist.

"I Don't Wanna Know" served as the lead single from his second studio album, Hurt No More (2004), which peaked at number two on the Billboard 200. The following year, he co-wrote CeCe Winans' song "Pray", which won the Grammy Award for Best Gospel/Contemporary Christian Music Performance at the 46th Annual Grammy Awards.

Winans's recording work accompanies a career in production and songwriting, from which he has been credited on releases for artists including the Weeknd, Kanye West, the Notorious B.I.G., Ice Spice, Lil' Kim, Destiny's Child, Jennifer Lopez, Pusha T, Busta Rhymes, and Trey Songz, among others.

== Career ==
=== Hurt No More (2001–2005) ===
Mario Winans recorded his second album Hurt No More in 2001, 2002, and 2003 in between working with other artists. The album is based on stories of love and betrayal.

The first single "I Don't Wanna Know" was based on a sample of the Fugees' 1996 hit single "Ready or Not", which itself was based on a slowed-down sample of the instrumental track "Boadicea" by Enya from her 1987 self-titled album. Enya and her representatives said yes to Winans and P. Diddy for her approval of the sample. She even re-recorded Boadicea for the song, although Winans had no idea that the Fugees sample he had used was a sample itself. They even gave Enya herself credit for the single as "Mario Winans featuring P. Diddy and Enya". The song features a rap by P. Diddy. The song was released as a single in early 2004 and became a worldwide hit, reaching number 1 in Germany and the United Kingdom and on the rhythmic top 40 radio chart in the United States; to number 2 on the Billboard Hot 100 and the US R&B/Hip-Hop singles chart; and to number 3 on both the Australian and Norwegian singles charts. It also reached the top ten on a composite European singles chart.

Hurt No More was released on April 20, 2004, in the US and by early June 2004 had reached number 1 on the Billboard R&B/Hip-Hop Albums chart, number 2 on the Billboard 200, and number 3 on the UK Albums Chart.

The album's second single, "Never Really Was", used a sample of the orchestrated beginning of Madonna's 1986 hit "Papa Don't Preach" as its background music. However, the song failed to chart in North America. A remix version was released as a single featuring rapper Lil Flip.

The song "This Is the Thanks I Get" was stated to be the album's third and final single but no official release was set. The song went on to peak on the Billboard Bubbling Under R&B chart at number 12.

== Discography ==
=== Albums ===
List of studio albums, with selected chart positions
Title	Album details	Peak chart positions										Certification
Title	Album details	US	US R&B	AUS	DEN	FRA	GER	NED	NZ	SWI	UK	Certification
Story of My Heart	Released: June 24, 1997; Label: Motown; Formats: CD, LP, cassette	—	—	—	—	—	—	—	—	—	—	
Hurt No More	Released: April 20, 2004; Label: Bad Boy; Formats: CD	2	1	37	27	22	6	33	28	13	3	RIAA: Gold; BPI: Platinum

=== Singles ===
List of singles as lead artist, with selected chart positions and certifications, showing year released and album name
Year	Title	Peak chart positions				Certifications	Album
Year	Title	US	US R&B	AUS	UK	Certifications	Album
1997	"Don't Know"	108	48	—	—		Story of My Heart
2004	"I Don't Wanna Know" (featuring Enya and P. Diddy)	2	2	2	1	RIAA: Platinum; ARIA: Platinum; BPI: Gold; BVMI: Gold	Hurt No More
2004	"Never Really Was" (featuring Lil' Flip)	—	90	—	44		Hurt No More
2005	"This Is the Thanks I Get" (featuring Black Rob)	—	112	—	—		Hurt No More
2010	"Mine" (featuring Sahara aka Costi Ioniţă & Andrea)	—	—	—	—		

=== As featured artist ===
List of singles as lead artist, with selected chart positions and certifications, showing year released and album name
Year	Title	Peak chart positions					Certifications	Album
Year	Title	US	US R&B	US Rap	US Rhy	UK	Certifications	Album
1999	"Best Friends" (Puff Daddy featuring Mario Winans)	59	3	9	—	24		Forever
2002	"I Need a Girl (Part Two)" (P. Diddy featuring Ginuwine, Loon)	4	2	2	1	4	BPI: Silver; RMNZ: Platinum	We Invented the Remix
2002	"Rock the Party" (Benzino featuring Mario Winans)	82	28	20	—	—		Redemption
2003	"Down 4 Me" (Loon featuring Mario Winans)	103	28	19	—	—		Loon
2003	"Crush on You" (Mr. Cheeks featuring Mario Winans)	—	52	—	—	—		Back Again!
2005	"You're the One" (Guerilla Black featuring Mario Winans)	77	43	24	23	—		Guerilla City
2007	"Through the Pain (She Told Me)" (Diddy featuring Mario Winans)	—	107	—	—	50		Press Play
2007	"Hey Baby (After the Club)" (Ashanti featuring Mario Winans)	—	87	—	40	—		The Declaration
2008	"Forever" (Timati featuring Mario Winans)	—	—	—	—	—		The Boss, SWAGG
2009	"Dream" (Massiv featuring Mario Winans)	—	—	—	—	—		Meine Zeit
2012	"I Need a Girl (Part Three)" (Kay One featuring Mario Winans)	—	—	—	—	—		Prince of Belvedair
2017	"Type (E)" (Eyedi featuring Mario Winans)	—	—	—	—	—		Chapter 21

=== Production ===
- 2009
  - Diddy - Press Play
    - "Last Night" (featuring Keyshia Cole), "Through the Pain (She Told Me)", "Thought You Said" (featuring Brandy)

== Awards and nominations ==
- Grammy Awards
  - 2005, Best Contemporary R&B Album: Hurt No More (Nominated)
- Grammy Awards
  - 2016, Best Rap Song: "All Day" (Nominated; as writer/co-producer)
- Image Awards
  - 2005, Outstanding New Artist (Nominated)
- MOBO Awards
  - 2004, Best Song: "I Don't Wanna Know" (Nominated)
  - 2004, Best Ringtone: "I Don't Wanna Know" (Winner)
- Teen Choice Awards
  - 2004, Choice R&B Artist (Nominated)
  - 2004, Choice Breakout Music Artist (Nominated)
  - 2004, Choice Single: "I Don't Wanna Know" (Nominated)
  - 2004, Choice R&B Track: "I Don't Wanna Know" (Nominated)
  - 2004, Choice Music Hook Up: "I Don't Wanna Know" (Nominated)
- Vibe Awards
  - 2004, R&B Song of the Year: "I Don't Wanna Know" (Nominated)

== Filmography ==
- Mike Jones - American Dream (2007)
