= Benzino =

American media proprietor, television personality

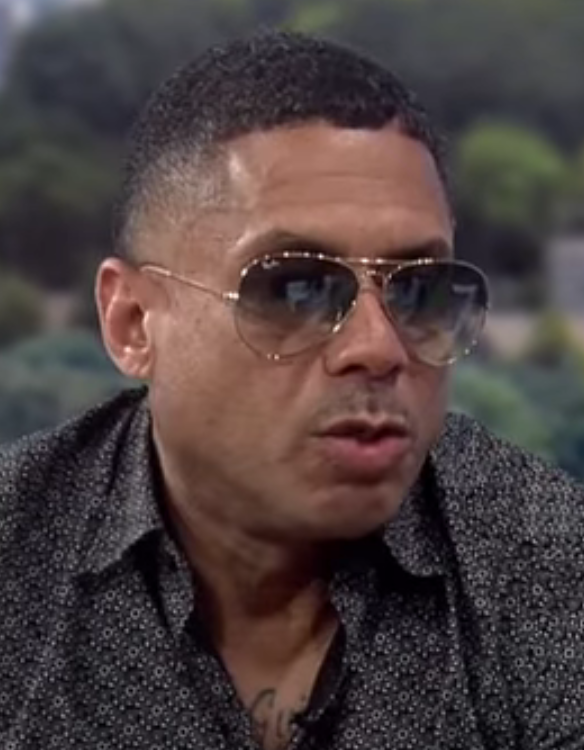
- Benzino in 2018

Background information
- Also known as: Ray Benzino; Ray Dog
- Born: Raymond Darius Scott; July 18, 1965 (age 61); Boston, Massachusetts, U.S.
- Genre: East Coast hip-hop
- Occupations: Media executive; record producer; songwriter; rapper
- Years active: 1986–present
- Labels: ZNO; 7th Floor; Elektra; Motown
- Formerly of: The Almighty RSO; Made Men
- Children: 4, including Coi Leray

Raymond Scott (born July 18, 1965), better known by his stage name Benzino or Ray Benzino, is an American urban media proprietor, television personality, rapper and record producer. Benzino is noted for his production work in East Coast hip-hop music, both solo and as part of the production team Hangmen 3, and his ownership of The Source magazine.

== Career ==
Benzino has said one of the primary inspirations to enter the genre of rap stems from his fondness of the film Wild Style. Benzino was a founding member of rap groups the Almighty RSO and Made Men. He has appeared on the reality television show Love & Hip Hop: Atlanta since 2012.

In 1988, he helped found The Source magazine with David Mays in Boston. The magazine grew to become known for its coverage of hip hop music and culture. Benzino and Mays left The Source in 2005.

== Personal life ==
Benzino's father Edward DeJesus was Puerto Rican and his mother Mary Scott was Cape Verdean. His sisters are Anita Scott-Wilson and Maureen Scott. In 2021, the rapper fell out with his daughter, Coi Leray, after she dissed Benzino in her song "No More Parties".

Benzino has dated Karlie Redd and Althea Heart. Benzino and Heart had a son together in November 2015, but they broke off their engagement shortly thereafter. They appeared together on Season 6 of the television show Marriage Boot Camp chronicling their broken relationship.

On March 29, 2014, Benzino was shot after attending his mother's funeral in Duxbury, Massachusetts. He was shot in the shoulder and back by his 36-year-old nephew Gai Scott, who was later arrested for shooting him.

=== Legal issues ===
On April 16, 2019, Benzino was stopped in Brookhaven, Georgia and cited for driving an uninsured vehicle. He was not the policy holder responsible for insuring the vehicle. On June 22, 2019, Benzino was arrested for a bench warrant in DeKalb County, Georgia, and was taken to police headquarters for booking and was later jailed. As he was being transported there, he launched a racist tirade against a police officer arresting him, who was of Vietnamese descent. The tirade involved multiple racial slurs and maternal insults. On July 31, 2020, Benzino was arrested and charged with criminal damage to property. He was accused of damaging the Chevrolet Silverado pickup truck of a man who was in the company of Benzino's ex-fiancée Althea Heart. On February 3, 2022, Benzino was arrested and charged with one count of second degree criminal damage to property, a felony.

==== Feud with Eminem ====
Benzino is known for being involved since 2002 in a widely publicized feud with rapper Eminem; the feud began after his The Source magazine rated The Eminem Show as four mics out of five. Eminem blamed the magazine and its co-founder Benzino for what he considered an unfair rating. Benzino later released diss tracks towards Eminem, titled "Pull Your Skirt Up" (calling him "2003 Vanilla Ice") and "Die Another Day", while Eminem released "The Sauce" and "Nail in the Coffin". As a continuation of this animosity between the two, Benzino released the diss mixtape Benzino Presents: Die Another Day: Flawless Victory, further disparaging Eminem.

In 2024, Eminem was featured on American music video company Lyrical Lemonade's song "Doomsday Pt. 2", a sequel to "Doomsday", performed by Cordae and Juice Wrld. Eminem's verse is a diss at Benzino, mentioning Benzino's daughter Coi Leray.

==== Rap Elvis with Natalac ====
In response to Eminem's verse, Benzino released the diss track "Rap Elvis" within 2 days of the "Doomsday Pt. 2" release. The song was allegedly ghostwritten. Rapper Ness Lee claimed he was the original writer. Benzino released Rap Elvis music video [Eminem Diss] filmed in different locations throughout Detroit, including Eminem's restaurant Mom's Spaghetti with a feature from Jacksonville rapper Natalac wearing a white mink coat. The video features Benzino sampling and discarding the spaghetti even taking the sign from the restaurant.

== Discography ==
=== Studio albums ===
- The Benzino Project (2001)
- Redemption (2003)
- Arch Nemesis (2005)
- The Antidote (2007)

=== Collaboration albums ===
- In Tha Company of Killaz with Wiseguys (1996)
- Doomsday: Forever RSO with the Almighty RSO (1996)
- Classic Limited Edition with Made Men (1999)
- No Skits Vol. 1 with Hangmen 3 (2000)

=== Remix albums ===
- The Benzino Remix Project (2002)

=== Mixtapes ===
- Die Another Day: Flawless Victory (2003)
- When the Heavens Fall with 1st 48 (2010)
- Caezar (2011)
- Blue Bag with 1st 48 (2011)
- The Magnificent 757's with Stevie J (2012)
- Crushed Ice (2013)
- Welcome to Texaco City with OJ da Juiceman (2015)

=== Charted singles ===
- "Rock the Party" (2002, US No. 82)

==== As featured artist ====
List of singles as featured artist
Title	Year	Album
"Run Tell That" (Natalac featuring Benzino and Mr Smith aka Bo$$ Money)	2021	Love & Pimp-Hop
"Trending Topic" (Natalac featuring Benzino and Mr Smith aka Bo$$ Money)	2025	"The Return of Goldie"

== Filmography ==
=== Film ===
Year	Title	Role	Notes
2000	Da Hip Hop Witch	Himself	
2005	Bloodline	Kilo	
2011	Baghdad	Himself	
2016	Hollywood Hearts	Himself	TV movie
2020	Turnt	Meko	
2020	Indictment: Who Is Jonathan Carter?	James	TV movie
2020	False Advertisement	-	
2023	On Da Run	Matteo	
2023	I Want Her	Mike	
2026	As We Lay	Noah	Tv movie

=== Television ===
Year	Legacy	Role	Notes
2003	Soul Train	Himself	Episode: "Marques Houston/Solange Knowles/Benzino"
2014	Town Bizzness	Himself	Episode: "T-Pain in Seattle"
2012-14	Love & Hip Hop: Atlanta	Himself	Main Cast: Season 1-3
2015-16	Marriage Boot Camp: Reality Stars	Himself	Main Cast: Season 4
2016	The Next :15	Himself	Main Cast
2017	Tamar & Vince	Himself	Episode: "Love and War"

=== Music Videos ===
Year	Song	Artist
1993	"Hey Mr. D.J."	Zhané
1995	"Craziest"	Naughty by Nature
2003	"Clap Back"	Ja Rule
