= Made Men =

American hip hop group

- Origin: Boston, Massachusetts, U.S.
- Genres: East Coast hip hop
- Years active: 1997–2002
- Labels: Restless; Relativity
- Spinoff of: The Almighty RSO
- Past members: Antonio Twice Thou; Benzino; Cool Gsus

The Made Men was an American rap group signed to Restless Records and Relativity Records composed of former Almighty RSO members Benzino and Antonio Twice Thou (formally E-Devious), and Cool Gsus. The group first appeared on DJ Clue's debut album, The Professional on the self-titled track, "Made Men". They then issued their debut album Classic Limited Edition on August 24, 1999, but the album failed to meet expectations, only making it to 61 on the Billboard 200. Although they never released a follow-up, the group continued to make guest appearances on albums by other artists and soundtracks. They last appeared on Daz Dillinger's Who Ride wit Us: Tha Compalation, Vol. 1 in 2001.

== Discography ==
=== Studio albums ===
| Title | Release | Peak chart positions | |
| Title | Release | US | US R&B |
|---|---|---|---|
| Classic Limited Edition | Released: August 24, 1999; Label: Restless | 61 | 9 |
