= Tommy Butler =

British police officer (1912–1970)

Tommy Butler MBE
- Born: 21 July 1912; Fulham, London, England
- Died: 20 April 1970 (aged 57)
- Police career
- Department: Metropolitan Police Service
- Rank: Chief Superintendent, head of the Flying Squad

Thomas Marius Joseph Butler MBE (21 July 1912 – 20 April 1970) was a Detective Chief Superintendent in the Metropolitan Police in London. He was most notable for leading the team of detectives that investigated the Great Train Robbery in 1963. Butler was arguably the most renowned head of the Flying Squad in its history. He became known as "One Day" Tommy for the speed with which he apprehended criminals and the "Grey Fox" for his shrewdness.

== Family ==
Butler was born in Fulham, west London. His mother's maiden name was Langthurne. He never married and lived with his mother.

== Police career ==
Butler was far from a typical policeman. He had a meteoric rise through the ranks, going from Detective Sergeant to Chief Superintendent in under a decade. Butler was utterly committed to his work and was a lifelong bachelor who lived with his mother in West London. He was a non-smoker and only moderate drinker.

Butler was involved in an investigation of corrupt Police officers in Brighton and also investigated and curtailed the activities of Jack Spot and Bill Hill.

At one point in his career, he was sent to Cyprus before it gained independence from Britain in 1960 to advise the Police on how to combat the Greek Cypriot group EOKA, led by General Grivas. From 1955 to 1959 EOKA waged an armed struggle against the British administration which aimed to achieve Enosis, or the union of Greece and Cyprus, similar to Crete and the Ionian Islands.

Before the Great Train Robbery, Butler had already gained experience investigating organized crime in London. In 1960, while serving in the Flying Squad, he prepared a report on the Kray twins and their activities in the East End, including their involvement in protection rackets. The report described the twins' growing influence among London's criminal networks and reflected the difficulties faced by detectives in gathering evidence against them.

== The Great Train Robbery ==
=== Initial investigations ===
Malcolm Fewtrell of Buckinghamshire CID and Detective Superintendent Gerald McArthur of Scotland Yard were in charge of carrying out the initial hunt for the thieves. McArthur was sent by Scotland Yard upon the request of the local police force, and had Detective Sergeant John Pritchard assisting him.

George Hatherill, Commander of the C Department and Ernie Millen, Detective Chief Superintendent, and chief of the Flying Squad were initially in charge of the London side of the investigation.

=== Train Robbery Squad ===
Butler became head of the Flying Squad shortly after the Great Train Robbery, after Millen became promoted to Deputy Commander to George Hatherill. On 12 August 1963 Butler was appointed to head the police investigation of the London connection (with no local criminals capable of the robbery). He formed the six-man Train Robbery Squad: Detective Inspector Frank Williams, Detective Sergeant Steve Moore, Detective Sergeant Jack Slipper, Detective Sergeant Jim Nevill, Detective Sergeant Lou Van Dyck, and Detective Constable Tommy Thorburn.

The decision to publish photos of the wanted suspects was already made by Hatherill and Millen, despite strong protests from Tommy Butler and Frank Williams. This resulted in most of the robbers going to ground.

The debate between the police and the robbers as to whether the police broke the law to convict them, and relied upon informants has raged on through the years. In particular the gang claim that Gordon Goody and the innocent Bill Boal were blatantly framed.

=== 1964 trial ===
The trial of the robbers began at Aylesbury Assizes, Buckinghamshire on 20 January 1964. Justice Edmund Davies presided over the trial which lasted 51 days and included 613 exhibits and 240 witnesses. The jury retired to the Grange Youth Centre in Aylesbury to consider their verdict.

==== John Daly acquittal ====
On 11 February 1964, there was a sensation, when John Daly was found to have no case to answer when his counsel, Mr W. Raeburn QC claimed that the evidence against his client was limited to his fingerprints' being on the Monopoly set found at Leatherslade Farm and that he went underground after the robbery. He went on to say that Daly had played Monopoly with his brother in law Bruce Reynolds earlier in 1963 and that he had gone underground because he was associated with people publicly sought by the police; this was not proof of involvement in a conspiracy. The judge agreed and the jury was directed to acquit him. Frank Williams was shocked when this occurred, because owing to Butler's refusal to share information, he had no knowledge of the fact that Daly's prints were only on the Monopoly set. If he had known this, he could have asked Daly questions about the Monopoly set and have relieved him of his very effective alibi. Daly was also clever, however, in avoiding having a photo taken when he was arrested until he could shave his beard. This meant that there was no photo to show the lengths he had gone to, in order to change his appearance. No action was taken against Butler for his mistake in not ensuring the case against Daly was more thorough.

=== Verdicts ===
On 15 April 1964 the proceedings ended with the judge describing the robbery as "a crime of sordid violence inspired by vast greed" and passing sentences of 30 years imprisonment on seven of the robbers.

=== Escape ===
After the trial, two of the Great Train Robbers, Charlie Wilson and Ronnie Biggs, escaped from captivity.

On 12 August 1964, Wilson escaped from Winson Green Prison in Birmingham in under three minutes when a three-man team broke into the prison to extricate him. His escape team was never caught and the leader nicknamed "Frenchy" disappeared from the London criminal scene by the late '60s. Two weeks after his escape Wilson was in Paris for plastic surgery and to grow out his prison haircut. By November 1965, Wilson was in Mexico City visiting old friends Bruce Reynolds and Buster Edwards.

Eleven months after Wilson's escape, in July 1965, Biggs escaped from Wandsworth Prison, only fifteen months into his sentence via a furniture van parking alongside the prison walls. A ladder was dropped over the thirty foot wall into the prison, during outside exercise time, to allow four prisoners to escape, including Biggs. The escape was planned by recently released prisoner Paul Seaborne, with the assistance of two other ex-convicts, Ronnie Leslie and Ronnie Black, and support from Charmian Biggs. The plot saw two other prisoners interfere with the warders and allow Biggs and friend Eric Flower to escape. Seaborne was later caught by Butler and sentenced to four and a half years and Ronnie Leslie to three years for being the getaway driver. The two other prisoners who took advantage of the Biggs escape were captured after three months. Biggs and Flower paid significant money to get smuggled to Paris for plastic surgery. Biggs said he had to escape because of the length of the sentence and the severity of the prison conditions.

The escape of Wilson and Biggs meant that five of the robbers were then on the run.

== Pursuit ==
Throughout the three years Jimmy White spent on the run with wife Sheree, and baby son Stephen, he was continually taken advantage of or let down by his friends and associates. His share of the money was dwindling rapidly with no hope of staying in the one place to earn more. On 10 April 1966 a new friend recognised him from photos in a newspaper and informed police. They arrested him at Littlestone while he was at home. According to the arresting officer, then Detective Sergeant Jack Slipper, he was sent to Littlestone by Tommy Butler, and that when he got there, White surrendered peacefully on condition that they treat his wife and child with great respect. During questioning by Slipper, White hinted that the police had stolen some of the money from the caravan as the sum reported was less than what White had left there. Slipper got White to draw a diagram of the hideaways that he had constructed in the caravan, allowing police to go back and find around £6,000 more that they had missed the first time.

White had only £2,000 left with him of the robbery money at the time of the arrest, with the rest long gone or recovered from the caravan. He was tried in June 1966 at Leicester Assizes and plead guilty to robbery, in exchange the prosecution accepted his plea of not guilty to the charge of conspiracy to rob. Justice Nield only sentenced him to 18 years jail (far less than the original terms of 30 years for the others). With the capture of Jimmy White, finally in 1966 after 3 years on the run, only the exiled criminals Bruce Reynolds, Buster Edwards, Charlie Wilson and Ronald Biggs were still on the run.

On 6 June 1964, Bruce Reynolds arrived in Mexico City after leaving Britain shortly after the sentences were handed down at Aylesbury. Wife Angela and son Nicholas eventually left Britain after a period of surveillance and questioning by the police, and arrived in Mexico in July 1964. In early 1965 they were joined by Ronald "Buster" Edwards, wife June and daughter Nicolette. They were all dismayed at Jimmy White's capture and watched for news of his trial with interest. After his breakout from prison, Charlie Wilson visited the others in Mexico in late 1965, and stayed with the Edwards family for 6 weeks, before returning to Montreal in January 1966.

=== Buster Edwards ===
While Tommy Butler was concentrating on the search for gang leader, Bruce Reynolds, Frank Williams concentrated on the most likely candidate for surrender, Buster Edwards, to whom he sent various messages by talking to Edwards' London associates over a two-year period. For a while the Edwards family was happy, and took a holiday to the US and then for two weeks in Canada visiting Charlie Wilson in Canada. But while the cash was coming through upon request from the Swiss bank accounts, more than £30,000 was lost as fees for this privilege and several times they were asked by tourists about any connection to the Great Train Robbery. June and Nicolette Edwards were deeply unhappy in Mexico, so Edwards was forced to use the exile as a temporary measure to arrange a deal to surrender for a reduced sentence. They followed news of Jimmy White's sentence of 18 years and thought it was a sign that a deal on much more favourable terms was possible.

In early 1966, Edwards met at Excelsior Hotel, Cologne with an associate who had talked to Frank Williams about a deal. A surrender date was agreed as was discussion of the continuance of the Edwards' wigmaking business and other issues. Tommy Butler at this stage was involved in an investigation of a gun battle, and had left Williams in charge of the Flying Squad in his absence.

On Friday 16 September 1966, the Edwards family left Mexico to return to Britain. At 1.00am on 19 September 1966, Bernie Carton called Detective Superintendent Frank Williams to say that Edwards was ready to surrender. Williams called Butler (who was not involved in the preparations) who was uninterested in the news, believing it a hoax, and asked to be woken if Edwards was actually collared. Williams then went alone to the house, wondering if it were a potentially lethal trap and came into a dimly lit house where he walked into an opulent room with a large mahogany table. Sitting at the table sipping a glass of brandy, was Buster Edwards, with three other men, including Williams' contact (said to be Bernie Canton by Piers Paul Read) and two "minders", as well as an attractive and immaculately dressed woman who served drinks.

Buster had prepared a written statement which claimed that he had no part in the robbery but that he had been offered money to assist Jimmy White in cleaning up Leatherslade Farm. After Williams read the statement, Edwards signed it. He also claimed the Peta Fordham book was 'full of childish lies'. Upon his capture, he had only around £2,000 left of the money (half in a Swiss account and half with wife June). He was dramatically thinner than prior to the robbery and was unrecognisable to most of the Flying Squad. At 3.00am Butler arrived to question Edwards.

There was a two-day trial at Nottingham Assizes on 8 and 9 December 1966, where Justice Milmo found Edwards was guilty of conspiracy to rob and robbery, and was sentenced to twelve years on the first count and 15 years on the second count, to be served concurrently. Serving 15 years was three times what Buster had hoped for, but 3 years less than White and half what the other robbers had got.

There was public controversy over the failure of authorities to recover much of the money. In response to this, Frank Williams through his extensive contacts in the South London underworld tried to encourage the remaining robbers to surrender and get reduced sentences in return for also surrendering their share of the money. The remaining robbers were managing to stay one step ahead of the police and were largely out of the country.

In his book No Fixed Address, Frank Williams stated that some difficulty had come his way over the negotiations, even though he had kept Tommy Butler informed, and he had said he was keeping Ernie Millen informed. After visiting Butler on his deathbed however, Millen confirmed that Butler had never told him about them. Williams had hoped to secure his promotion to head the Flying Squad, through the careful negotiation of Edwards' surrender. This was not the case however, particularly as there was no large sum of money now left for Edwards to return with. The lighter sentence greatly annoyed his superiors, who considered Williams unsuitable to succeed Butler when he retired.

=== Postponing retirement ===
Butler was still keen to pursue the robbers, but at 55 years old he would need to postpone his retirement to do so. After his success in securing Jimmy White and Buster Edwards, Tommy Butler got Metropolitan Police Commissioner, Sir Joseph Simpson to suspend his retirement on his 55th birthday. After Butler's suspension of retirement, in early 1968, Frank Williams gave up trying to head the Flying Squad and moved to Scotland Yard's Murder Squad; he retired in February 1971 and became the Security Superintendent for Europe and the Middle East for Qantas. Butler's diligence paid off for him when he arrested Charlie Wilson in the town of Rigaud, Quebec, Canada on 25 January 1968.

=== Charlie Wilson ===
Wilson took up residence outside Montreal, Quebec, Canada on Rigaud Mountain in the upper-middle-class neighbourhood where the large, secluded properties are surrounded by trees. Wilson lived under the name Ronald Alloway, a name borrowed from a Fulham shopkeeper. He joined an exclusive golf club and participated in his local community activities. It was only when he invited his brother-in-law over from the UK for Christmas that Scotland Yard was able to track him down and recapture him. They waited three months before making their move, in hopes that Wilson would lead them to Reynolds, the last suspect still to be apprehended. Wilson was arrested on 25 January 1968 by Tommy Butler. Many in Rigaud petitioned to allow his wife and five daughters to stay in the Montreal area.

=== Bruce Reynolds ===
Reynolds was the last of the robbers to be caught. With Ronald (Buster) Edwards and family returned to the United Kingdom to arrange a deal with police, it was too risky for Reynolds to remain in Mexico. The Reynolds family left Mexico City on 6 December 1966, and went north through the US, until they got to Canada for a visit to Charlie Wilson and family at their lakeside home in Rigaud outside Montreal on 23 December 1966. In early 1967, the Reynolds family returned to London, with Bruce trying his hand at several jobs, albeit largely unsuccessfully. When it became apparent that their key accomplice who was sheltering and moving them from address to address was being investigated by police, they were forced to leave London and settle in Villa Cap Martin, in Torquay, Devon. Reynolds also took his wife and son to the scene of the robbery and showed them around.

Early in the morning on 8 November 1968, Nicholas Reynolds opened the front door in response to the doorbell being rung and a dozen policemen swarmed into the house and piled onto a startled Reynolds who was still in bed. Then Tommy Butler himself came into the room "Long time no see, Bruce. But I've got you at last". Reynolds could only smile and say "C'est la vie, Tom".

This was the triumphant moment of Tommy Butler's career, with months to go before his retirement he had finally caught the leader of the Great Train Robbers. In a one-on-one interview, Reynolds took a deal where Butler agreed not to press charges nor use aggressive tactics against his family or friends.

On 14 January 1969, at Buckingham Assizes, Aylesbury, Justice Thomson imposed the sentence of twenty-five years imprisonment on Reynolds. When asked by a reporter after the sentencing of Reynolds whether that was the end of it, Butler replied that it was not over until Ronnie Biggs was caught.

It appeared that Butler did have some information on Biggs from an informant, as Detective Sergeant Keith Dugard released pictures of Biggs on a cruise liner from Australia to Brazil, that he said were entrusted to him by Butler. He said that Butler asked him to keep them secret (presumably because one of the people pictured with Biggs was his informant). The picture was valuable in that it showed what Biggs looked like after plastic surgery.

== Retirement and death ==
In early 1969 Butler left by compulsory retirement. According to Bruce Reynolds, he had a job as Head of Security arranged with Midland Bank in January 1969.

Butler died in 1970, aged 57 years. His death was reported on the same day that Biggs' memoirs were published in The Sun. Ernie Millen and Frank Williams (both recently retired) visited Butler on his deathbed in hospital.

== Legacy ==
In 1973, Frank Williams, Butler's Train Robbery Squad deputy, wrote his account of the investigation in the book No Fixed Address in which he carefully criticised Butler and invited Biggs to make contact with him.

In 1981, Jack Slipper, another member of the Train Robbery Squad, released his autobiography Slipper of the Yard, which includes an account of the train robbery investigation in which he criticised Butler's autocratic style and secretive nature, but is respectful of his talents as a fearless and dogged investigator.

In May 2001, aged 71 and having suffered three strokes, Ronnie Biggs voluntarily returned to Britain and was promptly arrested and imprisoned. On 6 August 2009, Biggs was granted release from prison on "compassionate grounds" due to a severe case of pneumonia, after serving only part of the sentence imposed at trial (he did serve more than the other robbers).

== Media portrayal ==
Tommy Butler is the lead character in A Copper's Tale, the second part of a two-part BBC television drama entitled The Great Train Robbery that was first broadcast in the UK in December 2013. The role is played by Jim Broadbent. Coincidentally, the first part of The Great Train Robbery first aired on the same day that Ronnie Biggs died (18 December 2013).
