= Malcolm Fewtrell =

British police detective (1909-2005)

- Born: 28 September 1909; Ryde, Isle of Wight
- Died: 28 November 2005 (aged 96)
- Police career
- Department: Buckinghamshire Constabulary
- Rank: Chief Superintendent.

Ernest Malcolm Fewtrell (28 September 1909 – 28 November 2005) was a Detective Chief Superintendent in the Buckinghamshire Constabulary and head of Buckinghamshire CID. He led the initial investigation into the Great Train Robbery in 1963.

== Early life ==
Fewtrell was born in Ryde, on the Isle of Wight, where his father was a police officer. He attended Reading School, then spent 6 months in New South Wales, Australia working as a jackaroo on sheep stations. He then returned to the UK and became a police cadet with the Buckinghamshire Constabulary in 1927. Three of his five brothers also joined the police. After serving as a uniformed police constable, he joined Buckinghamshire CID. He married Anne Thomas in 1934, who was a nurse in the hospital where he had his appendix removed.

His reserved occupation as a police officer made him exempt from military service in the Second World War. He rose through the police ranks, becoming Detective Inspector at Chesham in 1950, and Detective Superintendent in 1954, and head of Buckinghamshire CID. He was involved in the A6 murder investigation when he was asked to find 10 redheaded men for an identity parade with James Hanratty.

== Great Train Robbery ==
On 8 August 1963, Fewtrell was called out in the early morning to Bridgego Bridge, near Linslade. He was head of the Buckinghamshire CID located at Aylesbury, and within a year of his scheduled retirement.

The track-side signal lights had been tampered with to stop the Glasgow–London mail train. The engine and the high-value carriage, containing money deposited at Scottish banks after the previous bank holiday weekend, had been decoupled from the other carriages, which were left a mile behind at Sears Crossing. The gang of robbers escaped with £2,600,000 of used banknotes. The train's driver, Jack Mills, had been beaten over the head and never fully recovered.

Fewtrell arrived at the scene of the crime at 5am and gathered evidence before taking statements from the driver and postal workers at Cheddington railway station. He established that about 15 hooded men in boiler suits were involved. Fewtrell originally thought that the robbers could have escaped to London via the nearby M1, but one member of the gang had made the mistake of telling the postal staff not to move for half an hour after they left and this suggested to the police that their hide-out could not be more than 30 miles (48 km) away. Having failed to find any forensic evidence at the crime scene, the police fanned out on a major search.

The resources of the Buckinghamshire police force were stretched, and Fewtrell advised the Chief Constable of Buckinghamshire to call in the Metropolitan Police at Scotland Yard. Over the following days, Fewtrell worked closely with Detective Superintendent Gerald McArthur reviewing the clues in the local area, while Detective Chief Superintendent Tommy Butler and Detective Sergeant Jack Slipper investigated leads in London. The gang's hideout at Leatherslade Farm near Oakley was discovered a few days later. After the farm was found by local police, Fewtrell visited with two Metropolitan Police detectives, where they found food, drink, and items from the train, all covered with fingerprints. As Fewtrell later recalled, "the whole place is one big clue." Fewtrell also interviewed Brian Field who was a solicitor's clerk who helped the robbers buy their hideout and he obtained an admission of responsibility for a hotel bill paid for with some of the stolen money. Most of the gang were captured, with the first arrests on 15 August.

The trial of the gang members opened in Aylesbury in January 1964. The local court building was too small for the numbers of defendants, lawyers, witnesses and journalists in attendance, so the trial was held in the offices of Aylesbury District Council instead. Fewtrell was in charge of security of the venue and the accused, and the evidence (including £300,000 in cash that had been recovered).

Fewtrell's last day of service in the police was 16 April 1964, when he attended court for the sentencing. Six of the twelve defendants were sentenced to 30 years in prison – a total 307 years between then.

== Later life ==
With journalist Ronald Payne, Fewtrell wrote two long articles in The Sunday Telegraph on 19 and 26 April 1964, and a book, The Train Robbers in 1964.

On leaving the police he worked at Portsmouth Polytechnic as an accommodation officer. He retired a second time in 1974, to Swanage in Dorset where he administered the neighbourhood watch.

He died at Poole Hospital, after a stroke. His wife predeceased him, and he was survived by a son and a daughter. His obituary in the Daily Telegraph noted a passing resemblance to John Thaw playing Inspector Morse.

== Media portrayal ==
Malcolm Fewtrell is a character in A Copper's Tale, the second part of a BBC television drama entitled The Great Train Robbery that was broadcast in December 2013. The role was played by Richard Hope.
