= Brian Field =

English criminal

Brian Arthur Field
- Born: December 15, 1934
- Died: April 27, 1979 (aged 44)

Brian Arthur Field (15 December 1934 – 27 April 1979) was an English solicitor's clerk who was one of the masterminds of the 1963 Great Train Robbery. He was the crucial link between the key informant, known only as "Ulsterman", who came up with the idea of robbing a money-laden night mail train, and also provided the details of the schedule and contents of the trains, and the gang capable of planning and carrying out such a complex, large-scale robbery.

Field was found guilty of conspiracy to rob, but his conviction was overturned on appeal. He only served prison sentence for perverting the course of justice, in relation to arranging the purchase of Leatherslade Farm, near Oakley, Buckinghamshire, which was used as the gang's hideout.

== Early life ==
Field was born on 15 December 1934 at Windsor and was immediately put up for adoption.

== Service in Korean War ==
He served two years in the Royal Army Service Corps, seeing service in Korea. When discharged from the military it was with 'a very good character'. The Korean War lasted from 25 June 1950 until an Armistice was signed on 27 July 1953, with 63,000 British troops involved (part of over 1 million troops on the South Korean side). Field would have been 18 when the war was over. While the Service Corps were considered combat personnel, they were primarily associated with transport and logistics. Later in life, while working with the Children's Book Centre, he would animatedly tell fellow Book Centre employee Tony Saez about living through the chaotic experience of being shelled during the war.

== Early career and personal success ==
Brian Field quickly became successful in both his personal and professional lives, he married a German girl named Karin and rose to be a solicitor's managing clerk for John Wheater & Co. Despite the fact that he was only 28 at the time of the robbery, he was already much more successful than his boss, John Wheater. Field drove a new Jaguar and had a house he called "Kabri" (an amalgam of Karin and Brian) with his wife at Bridle Road, Whitchurch Hill, Oxfordshire, near Pangbourne, while his boss owned a battered Ford and lived in a rundown neighbourhood. Part of the reason for this is that Field was not averse to giving some of his less savoury clients good information on what some of his wealthier clients had in their country houses, making them prime targets for the thieves. Another key reason being that an honest solicitor was useless to a career criminal of that era. What was needed was a bent solicitor who could arrange for alibis and friendly witness statements and bribe police and witnesses. As the managing clerk at his law firm, Field was able to carry out these activities and encourage repeat business. On one occasion he described the contents and layout of a house near Weybridge where his wife Karin had once been a nanny to a couple of criminals that he represented at various times in his career, Gordon Goody and Buster Edwards. He had arranged Buster's defence when he had been caught with a stolen car, and later met Goody at a nightclub in Soho. Field was then called upon to assist in the defence of Goody in the aftermath of the "Airport Job" which was a robbery carried out on 27 November 1962 at a branch of Barclays Bank at London Airport. This was the big practice robbery that the South West Gang had done prior to their grand scheme – the Great Train Robbery. Field was successful in arranging bail for Goody and Charlie Wilson.

== Great Train Robbery ==
Field was a crucial member of the Great Train Robber gang. He was the link between the gang's organizers and the informants who knew the details of the Royal Mail train and he was also crucial in arranging for the gang's escape with the loot and in purchasing the gang's hideout at Leatherslade Farm and was entrusted with its clean up (which ended badly).

=== Planning the robbery ===
The robbery was planned by several parties with no overall mastermind, although the robbery operation itself was planned and executed by Bruce Reynolds, the target and the information on the timing of the train and the amount of cash being carried, came from the unknown individual dubbed the "Ulsterman". The key field organisers were Gordon Goody, Buster Edwards, and Charlie Wilson. According to one account by Piers Paul Read (1978), in January 1963, shortly after the furore of the Airport Job had died down, Brian Field called Gordon Goody to a meeting at the Old Bailey and asked him whether he was interested in a large sum of money that only a large gang could steal. The following day, Goody and Edwards met with Field at his office at James and Wheater (New Quebec Street near Marble Arch). There they met with Field and another man called "Mark" who was well dressed, aged around 50, with hair turned silvery grey and who spoke with a smooth accent. "Mark" then convinced them to meet the actual informant and drove Edwards and Goody to Finsbury Park where they met another man they nicknamed the "Ulsterman", who was a slightly balding middle aged man, who spoke with a Northern Irish lilt (where Goody had grown up). The "Ulsterman" told them about the night mail trains doing runs between London and Glasgow with large amounts of money. Edwards and Goody then went and discussed the matter with Reynolds and Wilson and it was agreed that they should make a serious attempt. In the meantime they would recruit others and do practice train robberies. On 31 July, Goody and Edwards met with the "Ulsterman" for one last strategy meeting in Hyde Park. They agreed that his share of the loot would be delivered at Brian Field's house. It is at this meeting that Gordon Goody claimed that when he was in the toilet, Goody checked the pockets of his suit jacket and saw the name and address of the owner, presumably the "Ulsterman".

=== Leatherslade Farm ===
Bruce Reynolds and John Daly spotted a potential hideout in Leatherslade Farm at Brill only 27 miles from the crime scene. The farm also happened to be the only major farm in the area not labelled on local maps – the perfect hideout from the police. Field arranged for the farm to be purchased by one of his firm's clients, Leonard Dennis (Lennie) Field (no relation), who had come into some money as he was power of attorney over the affairs of his brother, Alexander Field who was serving time in prison. The two Fields went to see the farm, and in return for a promised sum from a robbery (though he was not told that it was a train robbery) Lennie Field agreed to act as the purchaser and pay the 10% deposit. John Denby Wheater, Field's employer, was the solicitor who carried out the conveyancing for the farm.

In addition to arranging the purchase of the farm, it was agreed that Brian Field would also arrange for the farm to be cleaned up and get rid of any trace of the robbers after they had left. When Gordon Goody asked about the details he was told that "Mark" would carry out the role of "Dustman" and clean up the farm in return for a 'drink' of £28,500. According to Buster Edwards, he stole £10,000 in ten shilling notes to help pay "Mark's" drink.

=== The robbery ===
Gordon Goody flew back into England under an assumed name and stayed the night and the following day with the Fields before getting Brian to drive him to Leatherslade at night and only a few hours before the robbery was to take place.

The robbery itself was the largest cash robbery in British history and went off largely as planned, with the train stopping at the red lights at Sears Crossing in accordance with the plan. Train driver, Jack Mills, was coshed on the head, and was forced to drive the hijacked train to the robbery site at Bridego Bridge. Still on time, the robbery was done and the robbers went to Leatherslade Farm, leaving only 7 of the 128 bags of cash left on the train. The share was around £150,000 for the 17 full gang members, (15 robbers, Brian Field and the "Ulsterman").

Field was then supposed to collect Goody, Edwards and two shares of the loot for himself and the "Ulsterman", but the police speculation that the robbers were still close by, and the description of the vehicle given to police by one of the train staff, and broadcast to the public meant that the plans had to be changed. The police believed that they were still in the area rather than fled to London, so the plans changed from leaving on Sunday to leaving on Friday, and the vehicles they had at the farm could no longer be used because they had been seen by the train staff. Field came on Thursday and took Roy to London to pick up his share of the loot and to take Roy James to London to find an extra vehicle. Bruce Reynolds and John Daly picked up cars, one for Jimmy White and the other for Bruce, John, Ronnie Biggs and the replacement train driver. Brian, wife Karin and his associate "Mark" brought the vans and drove the rest of the gang that remained to 'Kabri' to recover. This was far from ideal as he had not planned to get this involved, but Karin accepted the change in plans.

The gang spent much time trying to wipe the farm free of prints and burning some items of clothing. On Monday, however, Charlie Wilson rang Brian Field to check whether the farm had been cleaned, and did not believe Field's assurances. He called a meeting with Edwards, Reynolds, Daly, and James and they agreed that they needed to be sure, so they called Field to a Tuesday meeting at which he admitted he wasn't. Wilson would have killed him there and then but was restrained by the others. By the time they had gotten ready to go back to the farm however, they heard some bad news – it had been discovered.

== Trial at Aylesbury ==
In early 1964, ten of the robbers were in custody. With three of the robbers on the run, (and little prospect of an arrest anytime soon), two others interrogated and released, (for lack of evidence), and two others completely overlooked by authorities, (no evidence or known ties to the other gang members), it was decided that the trial of those in custody should go ahead. Brian Field retained the services of Lewis Hawser QC for his defence.

There were ten charges against 13 men: robbery (all except for John Wheater); conspiracy to rob (against all of them); receiving (3 charges against Roger Cordrey, 3 other charges against Bill Boal, and 1 against Brian Field), and 1 for perverting the course of justice against John Wheater.

=== Trial location crucial to outcome ===
Since the crime was committed in Buckinghamshire, it was decided that the trial should occur there, despite the small size of the local court facilities (Aylesbury Assizes). The authorities were desperate to hold the trial in the countryside out of reach of London, as the Government was coming under heavy fire over the robbery and was insisting on a trial that could not be tampered with by robbers with a proven history of beating the system. This was because it was known that while London had much more capable court facilities, London juries, particularly for cases involving large robberies, were far more accessible to local London criminals and were often tampered with. So to hold the trial at Aylesbury, the local council building was converted into use as a trial court. It was for this reason that Field was desperate to get the trial shifted to London, and had his junior counsel open proceedings by objecting to the first juror claiming that Karin Field had been approached by a man who claimed that he could get at some of the jurors. Tommy Butler however was called upon to investigate the incident and make a report to Judge Davies, who promptly dismissed the claim. There was no way that Butler was going to let Field move the trial to London.

=== Trial evidence ===
The prosecution had their work cut out for them as there was no evidence linking the gang to the crime at either the hijacking location at Sears Crossing or the robbery location at Bridego Bridge. This made it tough to establish their involvement in the actual robbery or even the conspiracy. The only evidence against the gang as a whole involved fingerprints of the gang at Leatherslade Farm, and most of these were on moveable objects as the gang had wiped down most surfaces. For Field there were no prints at the farm, but he had been involved in the purchase of the farm, although Lennie Field had acted as the purchaser (although he only paid the deposit) and Field's boss John Wheater, had done the conveyancing. It was obvious to the jury that one of the three men was deeply involved but it was not obvious which one. Lennie Field generally was the most helpful of the witnesses and generally blamed Brian Field for his part of the robbery.

=== Sentencing ===
Field was sentenced on 16 April 1964 with rest of the gang who had been caught, and he received 25 years for Conspiracy to Rob and 5 years for perverting the course of justice. He was found not guilty of the robbery itself (and in fact he was not present at the actual robbery).

=== Appeal ===
On 13 July 1964, the appeals by Brian Field against the charges of conspiracy to rob were allowed. This meant that his sentence was effectively reduced to 5 years only. He was only reluctantly acquitted of the robbery, with Justice Atkinson stating that he would not be surprised if he was not only part of the conspiracy, but also one of the robbers. But given there was no evidence linking him to either the conspiracy or the robbery, there was little choice but to acquit him. The charges against the other men were all upheld, with the exception of Lennie Field, Roger Cordrey and Bill Boal. In the end Lennie Field and Bill Boal got some measure of justice, and Cordrey got lucky, although despite the reduction in sentence, Boal still died in prison in 1970 after a long illness.

=== Disparity in sentencing ===
The two members of the gang who benefitted the least from their share of the loot were also the two luckiest in sentencing, with Cordrey, who had most of his share recovered by police, and Field, who had two thirds of his share found in Dorking Wood by hikers (having been buried there by his father, who had found the money in a laundry bag under his bed) both avoiding 30 year sentences for robbery and conspiracy to rob.

== Post Sentencing ==
Field served out his sentence and was released in April 1967.

While he was in prison, his wife Karin divorced him and married a German journalist.

In an article Karin wrote for the German magazine Stern, she confirmed that she took Roy James to Thame railway station so he could go to London, and that she led a convoy of two vans back to Kabri, where the gang were joined by wives and girlfriends for a celebratory party.

When Great Train Robbery gang mastermind, Bruce Reynolds returned to Great Britain in 1968 short on cash (having spent most of his share of the loot on the run), he tried to get in contact with Field, who was the only way he could get in touch with the Ulsterman. It seems that Field had been ambushed after his release from prison by recently released convict "Scotch Jack Buggy", who presumably roughed up or even tortured Field with an eye on getting some of the loot from the robbery. Field subsequently went to ground, and "Buggy" was killed shortly after. Reynolds gave up trying to find him and was caught later that year.

== Later life ==
In an effort to disappear, Brian Arthur Field changed his name to Brian Mark Carlton. Sometime after his release from prison, he married Welsh-born Sian Louise Hope. In the mid/late 1970s they worked for the Children's Book Centre (since sold) located on Kensington High Street in London. Field and Sian were responsible for the company's operations in central and Southern Europe, to where they shipped English language books and held book fairs at international English schools. (The schools were given a certain percentage of the revenue in exchange for hosting the book fairs for several days.) Much of this time was spent in Spain, where Brian demonstrated his guile during a customs warehouse strike in Madrid that was holding up the release of a shipment of books, endangering a number of scheduled book fairs. Brian, along with Tony Saez, who ran the book fairs in Madrid, and under the glare of the burly warehouse workers, simply drove into the warehouse, loaded a van full of boxes, and drove away. During this time, Brian also got to know the Prince of Spain's English tutor, and convinced her to bring Prince Felipe (subsequently crowned King Felipe VI) and his two sisters, then in their early teenage years, to a book fair being held at King's College, an international English school in Madrid. During their extended stays in Madrid, Brian and Sian stayed in the penthouse of the Hotel Aristos (now known as 'La Posada de El Chaflánon') on Avenida Pio XII in Chamartín.

== Death ==
Brian Arthur Field, aged 44, and his wife Sian Louise Carlton, aged 26, were involved in a fatal car crash on the M4 motorway on 27 April 1979 while returning from a visit to her parents in Wales. The accident occurred when a Mercedes driven by Stephen Chase-Gardener — married to Amber, the pregnant 28-year-old daughter of Raymond Bessone — hit a pothole, crossed a damaged central crash barrier and collided with Field’s oncoming Porsche. Brian Field and the occupants of the Mercedes — Amber Bessone, her husband, and their two children — were killed instantly. Sian Carlton was critically injured and died the following day at West Middlesex Hospital.
