= Great Train Robbery (1963) =

Robbery in Ledburn, England

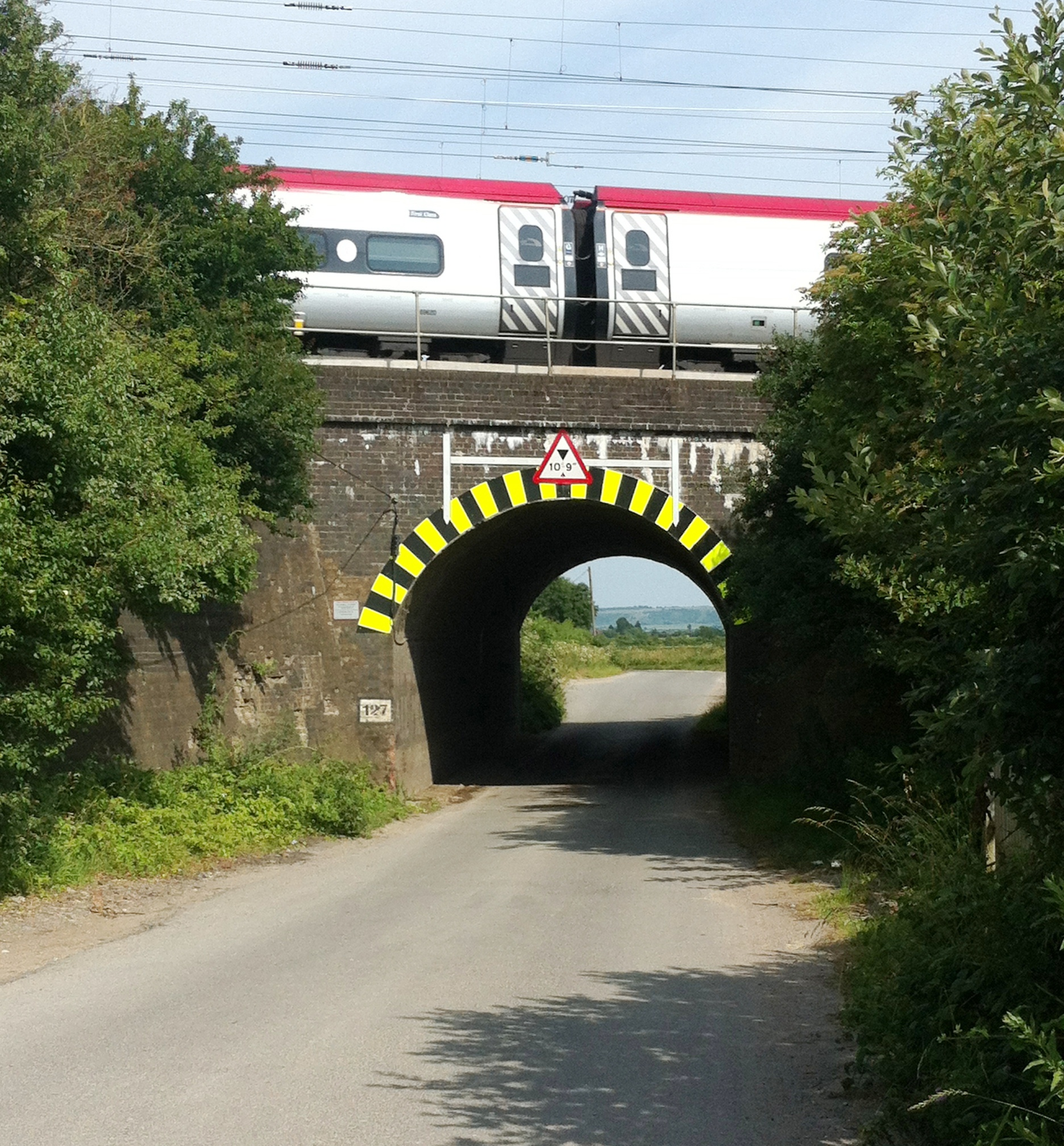
- Mentmore Bridge (previously known as Bridego Bridge and then Train Robbers' bridge), scene of the robbery
- Date: 8 August 1963; 63 years ago
- Time: Just after 03:00
- Location: Bridego Railway Bridge, Ledburn, England; 51°52′44″N 0°40′10″W
- Also known as: Cheddington Mail Van Raid
- Cause: Train robbery
- Participants: Bruce Reynolds; Roger Cordrey; Gordon Goody; Buster Edwards; Charlie Wilson; Jimmy Hussey; Ronnie Biggs; Tommy Wisbey; John Wheater; Jimmy White; Brian Field
- Outcome: Theft of £2.61 million (the equivalent of £48 million as of 2026)
- Injuries: Jack Mills (train driver)
- Charges: Conspiracy to rob; armed robbery; obstructing justice; receiving stolen goods
- Verdict: Guilty
- Convictions: 11 men sentenced (Bill Boal and Lennie Field later exonerated) to terms up to 30 years

The Great Train Robbery was the robbery of £2.61 million (worth about £49.67 million in 2026) from a Royal Mail train travelling from Glasgow to London, on the West Coast Main Line, in the early hours of 8 August 1963. It took place at Bridego Railway Bridge, Ledburn, near Mentmore, in Buckinghamshire, England.

After tampering with the lineside signals to bring the train to a halt, a gang of 15, led by Bruce Reynolds, attacked the train. Other gang members included Gordon Goody, Buster Edwards, Charlie Wilson, Roy James, John Daly, Jimmy White, Ronnie Biggs, Tommy Wisbey, Jim Hussey, Bob Welch and Roger Cordrey, as well as three men known only as numbers "1", "2" and "3"; two were later identified as Harry Smith and Danny Pembroke. A 16th man, an unnamed retired train driver, was also present.

With careful planning based on inside information from an individual known as "The Ulsterman", whose real identity has never been established, the robbers escaped with over £2.61 million. The bulk of the stolen money has never been recovered. The gang did not use any firearms, though Jack Mills, the train driver, was beaten over the head with a metal bar and suffered serious head injuries. After his partial recovery, Mills returned to work doing light duties. He retired in 1967 and died in 1970 due to an unrelated illness. Mills never overcame the trauma of the robbery.

After the robbery, the gang hid at Leatherslade, a farm located 27 miles (43 km) from the crime scene. The police found this hideout, and incriminating evidence, a Monopoly board with fingerprints, led to the eventual arrest and conviction of most of the gang. The ringleaders were sentenced to 30 years in prison.

== Robbery ==
=== Planning ===
The plan to intercept and rob the overnight Glasgow to London mail train was based on information from an unnamed senior security officer within the Royal Mail who had detailed knowledge of the amounts of money carried; he was introduced to two of the criminals who would carry out the raid—Gordon Goody and Buster Edwards—by a London solicitor's clerk, Brian Field.

The raid was devised over several months by a core team: Goody and Edwards along with Bruce Reynolds, and Charlie Wilson, with Reynolds assuming the role of "mastermind". This gang, although very successful in the criminal underworld, had virtually no experience in stopping and robbing trains, so it was agreed to enlist the help of another London gang called The South Coast Raiders. This group included Tommy Wisbey, Bob Welch, and Jim Hussey, who were already "accomplished" train robbers. This group also included Roger Cordrey, a man who was a specialist in rigging the track-side signals to stop the train.

Other associates (including Ronnie Biggs, a man Reynolds had previously met in jail) were added as the organisation evolved. The final gang who took part in the raid was composed of sixteen men.

=== Royal Mail train ===
At 18:50 on Wednesday 7 August 1963, the travelling post office (TPO) "Up Special" train set off from Glasgow Central station en route to Euston Station in London. It was scheduled to arrive at Euston at 04:00 the following morning. The train was hauled by English Electric Type 4 (later Class 40) diesel-electric locomotive D326 (later 40 126). The train consisted of 12 carriages and carried 72 Post Office staff who sorted mail during the journey.

Mail was loaded onto the train at Glasgow, at additional stations en route, and from line-side collection points where local post office staff would hang mail sacks on elevated track-side hooks that were caught by nets deployed by the on-board staff. Sorted mail on the train could be dropped off at the same time. This process of exchange allowed mail to be distributed locally without delaying the train with unnecessary stops. One of the carriages involved in the robbery is preserved at the Nene Valley Railway.

The second carriage behind the engine was known as the HVP (high-value packages) coach, which carried large amounts of money and registered mail for sorting. Usually, the value of the shipment was in the region of £300,000, but because the previous weekend had been a UK Bank Holiday weekend, the total on the day of the robbery was to be between £2.5 and £3 million.

In 1960, the Post Office Investigation Branch (IB) recommended the fitting of alarms to all TPOs with HVP carriages. This recommendation was implemented in 1961, but HVP carriages without alarms were retained in reserve. By August 1963, three HVP carriages were equipped with alarms, bars over the windows and bolts and catches on the doors, but at the time of the robbery, these carriages were out of service, so a reserve carriage (M30204M) without those features had to be used. The fitting of radios was also considered, but they were deemed to be too expensive, and the measure was not implemented. This carriage was kept for evidence for seven years following the event and then burned at a scrapyard in Norfolk in the presence of police and post office officials to deter any souvenir hunters.

=== Stopping the train ===
The robbers tampered with a signal light on the West Coast Main Line at Sears Crossing, Ledburn, between Leighton Buzzard and Cheddington, covering the green light with a glove and using a battery to power the red light. Just after 03:00 on 8 August, the driver, 58-year-old Jack Mills from Crewe, duly stopped the train at the signal. As a signal stop was unexpected at this time and place, the locomotive's second crew member, known as the second man, 26-year-old David Whitby, also from Crewe, climbed down from the cab to call the signalman from a line-side telephone, only to find the cables had been cut. As he returned to the train he was overpowered by one of the robbers. Meanwhile, gang members entered the engine cabin from both sides. As Mills grappled with one robber he was struck from behind by another with a cosh and rendered semi-conscious.

The robbers now had to move the train to Bridego Bridge (now known as Mentmore Bridge), approximately half a mile (800 m) further along the track, where they planned to unload the money. One of the robbers had spent months befriending railway staff and familiarising himself with the layout and operation of trains and carriages. Ultimately though, it was decided that it would be better to use an experienced train driver to move the locomotive and the first two carriages from the signals to the bridge after uncoupling the carriages containing the rest of the sorters and the ordinary mail.

On that night, the gang's hired train driver (an acquaintance of Ronnie Biggs, later referred to as "Stan Agate" or "Peter") was unable to operate this newer type of locomotive; having driven trains for many years, he was by then retired and was experienced only on shunting locomotives on the Southern Region. With no alternative available to them, it was quickly decided that Mills would have to move the train to the stopping point near the bridge, which was indicated by a white sheet stretched between poles on the track. Biggs's only task was to supervise Agate's participation in the robbery, and when it became obvious that Agate was not able to drive the train, he and Biggs were sent to the waiting truck to help load the mail bags.

=== Removing the money ===
The train was stopped at Bridego Bridge, and the robbers' "assault force" attacked the HVP carriage. Frank Dewhurst was in charge of the three other postal workers (Leslie Penn, Joseph Ware and John O'Connor) in the HVP carriage. Thomas Kett, assistant inspector in charge of the train from Carlisle to Euston, was also in the carriage. Dewhurst and Kett were hit with coshes when they made a vain attempt to prevent the robbers from storming the carriage. Once the robbers had entered the carriage, the staff could put up no effective resistance and there was no police officer or security guard on board to assist them. The staff were made to lie face down on the floor in a corner of the carriage. Mills and Whitby were then brought into the carriage, handcuffed together, and put down beside the staff.

The robbers removed all but eight of the 128 sacks from the HVP carriage, which they transferred in about 15–20 minutes to the waiting truck by forming a human chain. The gang departed in their Austin Loadstar truck some 30 minutes after the robbery had begun and, in an effort to mislead any potential witnesses, they used two Land Rover vehicles, both of which bore the registration plates BMG 757A.

Map of some places connected to the robbery

=== Getaway and planned cleanup ===
The gang then headed along minor roads, listening for police broadcasts on a VHF radio, the journey taking somewhere between 45 minutes and an hour, and arrived back at Leatherslade Farm at around 04:30, at around the same time as the first reports of the crime were being made. Leatherslade was a run-down farm 27 miles (43 km) from the crime scene, between Oakley and Brill. It had been bought two months earlier as their hideout.

At the farm, they counted the proceeds and divided it into 16 full shares and several 'drinks' (smaller sums of money intended for associates of the gang). The precise amounts of the split differ according to the source, but the full shares came to approximately £150,000 each.

From listening to their police-tuned radio, the gang learned that the police had calculated they had gone to ground within a 30-mile (50 km) radius of the crime scene rather than dispersing with their haul. This declaration was based on the information given by a witness at the crime scene who stated that a gang member had told the post office workers "not to move for half an hour". The press interpreted this information as a 30-mile (50 km) radius—a half-hour drive in a fast car.

The gang realised the police were using a dragnet tactic, and with help from the public, would probably discover the farm much sooner than had been originally anticipated. As a result, the plan for leaving the farm was brought forward to Friday from Sunday (the crime was committed on Thursday). The vehicles they had driven to the farm could no longer be used because they had been seen by the train staff. Brian Field came to the farm on Thursday to pick up his share of the loot and to take Roy James to London to find an extra vehicle. Bruce Reynolds and John Daly picked up cars, one for Jimmy White and the other for Reynolds, Daly, Biggs and the replacement train driver. Field, his wife Karin and his associate "Mark" brought the vans and drove the remainder of the gang to the Fields' home to recover.

Field had arranged with "Mark" to carry out a comprehensive clean-up and set fire to the farm after the robbers had left, even though the robbers had already spent much time wiping the place down to be free of prints. According to Buster Edwards, he took £10,000 in ten-shilling notes to help pay "Mark". However, on Monday, when Charlie Wilson rang Brian Field to check whether the farm had been cleaned, he did not believe Field's assurances. He called a meeting with Edwards, Reynolds, Daly and James and they agreed that they needed to be sure. They called Field to a meeting on Tuesday, where he was forced to admit that he had failed to burn the farm. In the IVS 2012 documentary film, The Great Train Robbery, Nick Reynolds (son of Bruce Reynolds) said "...the guy who was paid to basically go back to the farm and burn it down did a runner." Wilson would have killed Field there and then but was restrained by the others. By the time they were ready to go back to the farm, however, they learned that police had found the hideout.

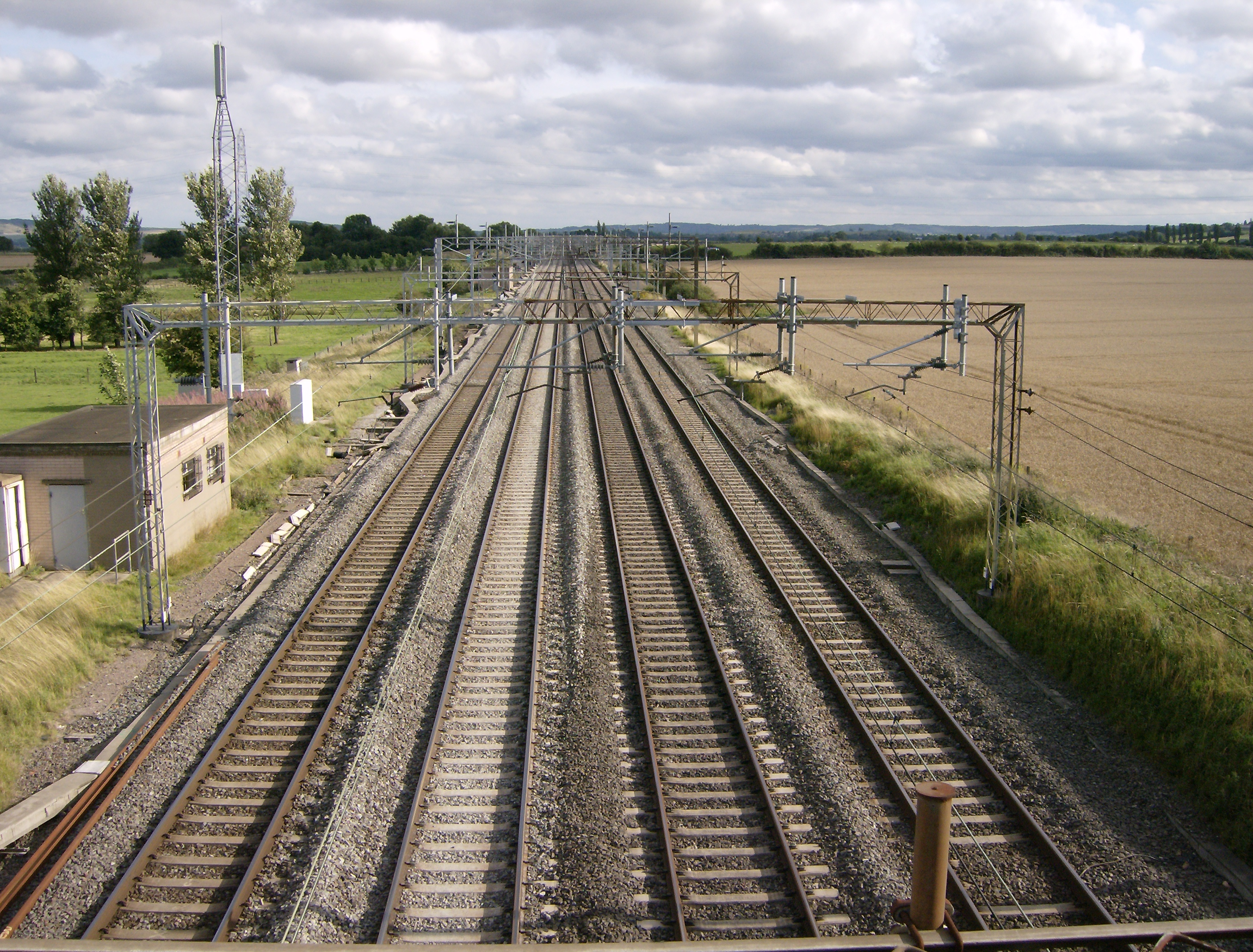
View towards 'Sears Crossing' where the robbers took control of the train

=== Money ===
There is some uncertainty regarding the exact cash stolen from the train. £2,631,784 is a figure quoted in the press, although the police investigation states the theft as £2,595,997 10s 0d, in 636 packages, contained in 120 mailbags—the bulk of the haul in £1 and £5 notes (both the older white note and the newer blue note, which was half its size). There were also ten-shilling notes and Irish and Scottish money. Because a 30-minute time limit had been set by Reynolds, eight out of 128 bags were not stolen and were left behind. Statistically, this could have amounted to £131,000 or 4.7% of the total. It is alleged that the total weight of the bags removed was 2.5 tons, according to former Buckinghamshire police officer John Woolley.

=== Raising the alarm ===
The robbers had cut all the telephone lines in the vicinity, but one of the rail-men left on the train at Sears Crossing caught a passing goods train to Cheddington, where he raised the alarm at around 04:20. The first reports of the robbery were broadcast on the VHF police radio within a few minutes and this is where the gang heard the line "A robbery has been committed and you'll never believe it – they've stolen the train!"

== Robbers and accomplices ==
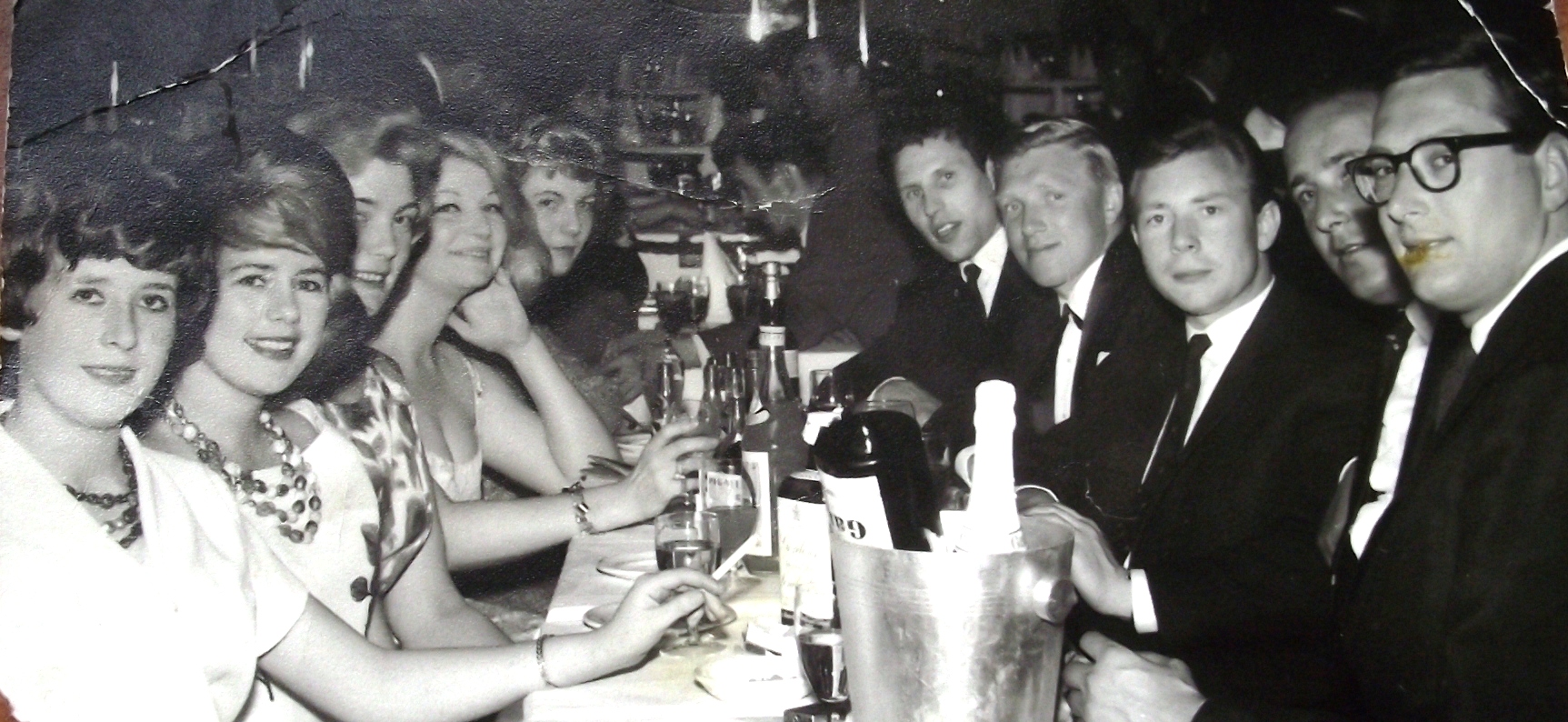
Men, right to left: Bruce Reynolds, John Daly, Terence Hogan, Michael Ball, and Charlie Wilson. Reynolds, Daly, and Wilson participated in the Great Train Robbery.

The gang consisted of 17 full members who were to receive an equal share, including the men who were at the robbery and two key informants.

The gang that carried out the robbery consisted of 15 criminals predominantly from south London: Gordon Goody, Charlie Wilson, Buster Edwards, Bruce Reynolds, Roy James, John Daly, Roger Cordrey, Jimmy White, Bob Welch, Tommy Wisbey, Jim Hussey, and Ronnie Biggs, as well as Harry Smith and Danny Pembroke, who were never charged due to the lack of evidence against them, and one still unknown, plus the train driver they nicknamed "Pop". The best-known member of the gang, Biggs, had only a minor role—to recruit the train driver.

=== Robbers ===
Great Train Robbers‡ indicates those absent during robbery
Name	Age	Born	Died	Role	Association	Captured	Left prison
Bruce Richard Reynolds	31	7 September 1931	28 February 2013	Leader	South West Gang leader	8 November 1968	1978
Douglas Gordon Goody	33	11 March 1930	29 January 2016	Deputy and organiser	South West Gang member	3 October 1963	23 December 1975
Charles Frederick Wilson	31	30 June 1932	23 April 1990	"Treasurer" and organiser	South West Gang member	22 August 1963 24 January 1968 (recaptured)	12 August 1964 (escaped) 15 September 1978
Ronald Christopher Edwards	32	27 January 1931	28 November 1994	Organiser	South West Gang member	19 September 1966 (voluntary)	April 1975
Brian Arthur Field ‡	29	15 December 1934	27 April 1979	Key informant, and organiser of mock purchase of gang hideout	Solicitor's clerk	15 September 1963	1967
Ulsterman possibly Patrick McKenna or Sammy Osterman ‡				Key informant and organiser	Contact with Goody and Edwards arranged through another man who contacted Field		
Roy John James	28	30 August 1935	21 August 1997	Getaway driver and carriage uncoupler	South West Gang associate	10 December 1963	August 1975
John Thomas Daly	32	6 June 1931	April 2013	Train stopper, getaway driver	South West Gang associate, Reynolds's brother-in-law	3 December 1963	Acquitted 14 February 1964
Unconfirmed; Believed to be Henry Thomas Smith				Carriage uncoupler	South West Gang associate		
James Edward White	43	21 February 1920	Before 2000	Quartermaster, carriage uncoupler	Thief who knew Reynolds	21 April 1966	April 1975
Identity unknown				Muscle	White's associate		
Roger John Cordrey	42	30 May 1921	2011	Train stopper, electronics expert	South Coast Raiders leader	14 August 1963	April 1971
Robert Welch	34	12 March 1929	October 2023	Muscle	South Coast Raiders	25 October 1963	June 1976
Thomas William Wisbey	33	27 April 1930	30 December 2016	Muscle	South Coast Raiders	11 September 1963	February 1976
James Hussey	31	8 April 1933	12 November 2012	Muscle	South Coast Raiders	7 September 1963	1975
Danny Pembroke	27	1936	2015	Muscle	South Coast Raiders		
Ronald Arthur Biggs	34	8 August 1929	18 December 2013	Contact for replacement train driver	Associate of Reynolds	4 September 1963 (initial capture) 7 May 2001 (voluntary return to UK)	8 July 1965 (escaped) 7 August 2009
Identity unknown	67			Replacement train driver (failed)	via Ronnie Biggs		

=== Bruce Reynolds ===
Bruce Richard Reynolds was born on 7 September 1931 at Charing Cross Hospital, Strand, London, to Thomas Richard and Dorothy Margaret (née Keen). His mother died in 1935, and he had trouble living with his father and stepmother, so he often stayed with one or other of his grandmothers. Reynolds was jailed for three years on several counts of breaking and entering, and upon his release quickly started re-offending. He soon joined a gang with best friend John Daly (future brother-in-law). They were mentored by South Western gang leaders Ernie Watts and Terry Hogan (a.k.a. Harry Booth). Also, he did some work with Jimmy White and met Buster Edwards at Charlie Richardson's club. Richardson in turn introduced him to Gordon Goody.

After the train heist, Reynolds escaped to Mexico with his wife, Angela, and young son, Nick Reynolds (who later became a member of the band Alabama 3, whose song "Woke Up This Morning" was the opening theme of The Sopranos) and lived lavishly with his share of the take, approximately £150,000. When that money ran out, Reynolds moved his family to Canada and then France under false identities, in search of work, before returning to the United Kingdom to pursue opportunities promised by his old criminal contacts. He was arrested in 1968 in Torquay and sentenced to 25 years in jail. He was released a decade later.

Reynolds was sent back to prison in the mid-1980s for dealing amphetamines. He produced occasional journalism pieces, was a consultant on movie and book projects about the train heist, and published a well-regarded crime memoir, Crossing the Line: The Autobiography of a Thief (1995). In a 2003 interview, Reynolds recalled: "from an early age I always wanted a life of adventure." He was rejected by the Royal Navy because of poor eyesight, and then tried to become a foreign correspondent, but his highest achievement in that vein was to become a clerk at the Daily Mail. While his life in crime did provide excitement, Reynolds said in 2003, "I've always felt that I can't escape my past. And in many ways, I feel that it is like a line from the 'Ancient Mariner' and that the notoriety was like an albatross around my neck." Reynolds died aged 81 on 28 February 2013 after a brief illness. He was survived by his son Nick.

=== Douglas Gordon Goody ===
Authorities regarded Douglas Gordon Goody as the mastermind of the operation. He first made contact with 'The Ulsterman' in a meeting set up by Brian Field in Finsbury Park. Of Northern Irish descent, Goody was born in Putney, London in March 1930 and was still living there in his mother's flat at the time of the robbery. In the early 1960s, he joined Buster Edwards' gang and helped rob various easy targets. In August 1963, he was arrested in connection with the Great Train Robbery and taken to the Leicester City Police Headquarters for questioning by Detective Chief Inspector Peter Vibart of the Flying Squad. Sentenced to 30 years for his role in the crime, he was released from prison in 1975. Goody then moved to the white-washed town of Mojácar in Almería, Spain, where he ran a beachfront bar.

In a September 2014 interview, Goody claimed the identity of 'The Ulsterman' was one Patrick McKenna, a postal employee. The interview was shown in a documentary marking the 50th anniversary of the robbery, called The Great Train Robbery: A Tale of Two Thieves. The documentary makers employed social worker Ariel Bruce, who finds missing family members, to trace McKenna. Discovered after obtaining records through the Freedom of Information Act, McKenna had died some years previously. However, Bruce made contact with McKenna's family and obtained copies of photographs, which Goody confirmed to be the same person he had met 50 years earlier. The documentary was shown in cinemas and on-demand in October 2014. It suggests that McKenna never benefitted from the money, but instead gave it to the Catholic Church. It suggests McKenna was motivated by the failure of the post office to provide better security for the night train staff, and he had hoped the robbery would be a wake up call. Goody died of emphysema on 29 January 2016 at the age of 85.

=== Charles Frederick (Charlie) Wilson ===
The most dangerous of the Great Train Robbers was 'the Silent Man' Charlie Wilson. He was born on 30 June 1932 to Bill and Mabel Wilson in Battersea. His friends from childhood were Jimmy Hussey, Tommy Wisbey, Bruce Reynolds and Gordon Goody. Later on, he met Ronald 'Buster' Edwards and the young driving enthusiasts Mickey Ball and Roy James, who had taken up car theft. From 1948 to 1950 he was called up for national service, and in 1955 he married Patricia (Pat) Osbourne, with whom he had three children. He turned to crime early in life and spurned his father's legitimate but low-income wage. While he did have legitimate work in his in-laws' grocer's shop, he also was a thief and his criminal proceeds went into buying shares in various gambling enterprises. He went to jail for short spells for numerous offences. In 1960, he began to work with Bruce Reynolds and planned to get into the criminal big league.

=== Ronald "Buster" Edwards ===
Ronald Christopher Edwards was born on 27 January 1932 at Lambeth, London, the son of a barman. After leaving school, he worked in a sausage factory, where he began his criminal career by stealing meat to sell on the post-war black market. During his national service in the RAF he was detained for stealing cigarettes. When he returned to South London, he ran a drinking club and became a professional criminal. He married June Rose in 1952. They had a daughter, Nicky. In his final years he ran a flower stall outside Waterloo station in London.

=== Brian Field ===
Brian Arthur Field was born on 15 December 1934 and was immediately put up for adoption. He served two years in the Royal Army Service Corps, seeing service during the Korean War. Although soldiers in the Service Corps were considered combat personnel, they were primarily associated with transport and logistics. When he was discharged from the military, it was with "a very good character".

Field later became a solicitor's managing clerk for John Wheater & Co. Although he was only 28 at the time of the robbery, he was already apparently more prosperous than his boss, John Wheater. Field drove a new Jaguar and had a house, "Kabri" (an amalgam of Karin and Brian [Field]), with his wife at Bridle Road, Whitchurch Hill, Oxfordshire, while his boss owned a battered Ford and lived in a run-down neighbourhood. Part of the reason for Field's prosperity was that he was not averse to giving Goody and Edwards information about what his clients had in their country houses, making them prime targets for the thieves. On one occasion he described the contents and layout of a house near Weybridge where his wife Karin had once been a nanny.

Prior to the robbery Field had represented Buster Edwards and Gordon Goody. He had arranged Edwards' defence when he had been caught with a stolen car and had met Goody at a nightclub in Soho. Field was called upon to assist in Goody's defence in the aftermath of the "Airport Job", which was a robbery carried out on 27 November 1962 at BOAC Comet House, Hatton Cross, London Airport. This was the big practice robbery that the South West Gang had done before the Great Train Robbery. Field was successful in arranging bail for Goody and Charlie Wilson.

=== "The Ulsterman" ===
In 2014, Douglas Goody claimed to journalists that "The Ulsterman" was Patrick McKenna, at the time of the robbery a 43-year-old postal worker living in Salford, Lancashire. McKenna, who was originally from Belfast, met Goody four times in 1963. Goody alleged that he found out McKenna's name only when he saw it written inside his spectacles case.

It is not known what became of the share McKenna allegedly received, but his children were "flabbergasted" on hearing the claim of their father's involvement. It was surmised that McKenna either donated his share to the Catholic church over the years or had had the money stolen from him.

This alleged identification of McKenna as "The Ulsterman" has been disputed; not least because McKenna appears to have had no criminal record or associations and died poor. It has been suggested that a known associate of the convicted robbers, Sammy Osterman, was part of the gang, and his "Ulsterman" soubriquet was simply the result of mishearing his surname.

=== Accomplices ===
William Gerald Boal (22 October 1913 – 26 June 1970), an accessory after the fact of Roger Cordrey, was convicted as being one of the robbers, despite playing a role no different from the many other accomplices of the various train robbers. Boal died in jail.

Leonard "Lennie" Denis Field (born 1931, date of death unknown) helped with the purchase of the Leatherslade Farm hideout, paying the deposit of £5,000 in return for a 'drink' of £12,000. Lennie Field was allowed to think that the plan was to hijack a lorry load of cigarettes. Despite not being in on the robbery, he was convicted and sentenced to 25 years (20 years for conspiracy to rob and five years for obstructing justice), which was later reduced to five. He was released from jail in 1967 and went to live in north London.

John Denby Wheater (born 17 December 1921, died 18 July 1985) was the employer of Brian Field. He was convicted and sentenced to three years. He died in Harrogate, near Leeds, aged 63.

== Aylesbury investigation ==
At 05:00, Chief Superintendent Malcolm Fewtrell, head of the Buckinghamshire Police Criminal Investigation Department (CID), located at Aylesbury, arrived at the crime scene, where he supervised evidence-gathering. He then went to Cheddington railway station, where the train had been taken, and where statements were taken from the driver and postal workers. A member of the gang had told the postal staff not to move for half an hour and this suggested to the police that their hide-out could not be more than 30 miles (50 km) away. It appeared, from interviews with the witnesses, that about 15 hooded men dressed in blue boiler suits had been involved, but little more could be gleaned.

By lunchtime of the following day, it became obvious to Fewtrell that extra resources were needed to cope with the scale of the investigation and the Buckinghamshire Chief Constable referred the case to Scotland Yard. George Hatherill, Commander of the C Department and Detective Chief Superintendent Earnest (Ernie) Millen, Head of the Flying Squad were initially in charge of the London side of the investigation. They sent Detective Superintendent Gerald McArthur and Detective Sergeant John Pritchard to assist the Buckinghamshire Police.

The police then undertook a major search, fanning out from the crime scene after having failed to find any forensic evidence there. A watch was put on the seaports. The Postmaster General Reginald Bevins offered a £10,000 reward to "the first person giving information leading to the apprehension and conviction of the persons responsible for the robbery".

=== Discovery of Leatherslade Farm ===
Following a tip-off from a herdsman who used a field adjacent to Leatherslade Farm, a police sergeant and constable called there on 13 August 1963, five days after the robbery. The farm was deserted but they found the truck used by the robbers, which had been hastily painted yellow, as well as the Land Rovers. They also found a large quantity of food, bedding, sleeping bags, post-office sacks, registered mail packages, banknote wrappers and a Monopoly board game.

It was determined that although the farm had been cleaned for fingerprints, some finger and palm prints (presumably of the robbers) had been overlooked, including those on a ketchup bottle and on the Monopoly set (which had been used after the robbery for a game, but with real money).

== London investigation ==
Despite the big breakthrough of the discovery of Leatherslade Farm, the investigation was not going well. The London side of the investigation then continued under Detective Chief Superintendent Tommy Butler, who replaced Millen as head of the Flying Squad shortly after Millen was promoted to Deputy Commander under George Hatherill. On Monday 12 August 1963, Butler was appointed to head the police investigation of the London connection and quickly formed a six-man Train Robbery Squad. With Leatherslade Farm finally found on 13 August 1963, the day after Tommy Butler was appointed to head the London investigation, the Train Robbery Squad descended on the farm.

The breakthrough came when Detective Chief Superintendent Millen met a distinguished barrister in a smoking room of an exclusive West End club who told him that someone was willing to inform on the gang. The process of talking to the informer was handled by Hatherill and Millen and they never divulged the identity of the informer to the detectives in their command. The informant had been jailed in a provincial prison just before the train robbery and was hoping to get parole and other favours from talking. He clearly did not know all the names perfectly, and a second informant (a woman) was able to fill in the gaps. Millen said in his book Specialist in Crime, "the break-through with the informer came at a moment when I and my colleagues at the Yard were in a state of frustration almost approaching despair". This process saw them get eighteen names to be passed on to detectives to match up with the list being prepared from fingerprints collected at Leatherslade. Hatherill and Millen decided to publish photos of the wanted men, despite strong protests from Tommy Butler and Frank Williams. This resulted in most of the robbers going to ground.

=== Tommy Butler, the thief-taker ===
Tommy Butler took over the Flying Squad and in particular the Train Robbery Squad. He became a renowned head of the Flying Squad. He was known variously as "Mr Flying Squad", as "One-day Tommy" for the speed with which he apprehended criminals and as the "Grey Fox" for his shrewdness. He was Scotland Yard's most formidable thief-taker despite being an unmarried man who still lived with his mother. Butler worked long hours and expected all members of the squad to do the same.

The squad later had to work out rotations whereby one member would go home to rest as otherwise they were getting only three hours of sleep per night and had no time to eat healthily or see their families. When the squad tried to get him to ease the working conditions, Butler was enraged and threatened to send them back to their normal duties. Butler was said to be very secretive, with Jack Slipper claiming in his book Slipper of the Yard (1981) that "he wouldn't even tell his own left hand what the right one was doing". This meant that Train Robbery Squad members were often dispatched on errands with no knowledge of how their tasks fitted into the overall investigation.

=== Train Robbery Squad ===
The six-man Train Robbery Squad consisted of Detective Inspector Frank Williams, Detective Sergeant Steve Moore, Detective Sergeant Jack Slipper, Detective Sergeant Jim Nevill, Detective Sergeant Lou Van Dyck and Detective Constable Tommy Thorburn. The senior officer, Frank Williams, was a quiet man. His speciality was dealing with informants and he had the best working knowledge of the south London criminal fraternity in the force. One of the squad, Jack Slipper, would later become head of the Flying Squad and would still be involved in the case many years later.

=== Post Office Investigation ===
The Post Office Investigation Branch (IB) had to establish the amount of money stolen, £2,595,997.10s.0d. They also sought to identify what money had been taken so that the relevant banks could be notified. Deficiencies in High-Value Package carriage security were reported and secure carriages were immediately brought back into service. The installation of radios was recommended as a priority. The investigation was detailed in a report by Assistant Controller Richard Yates that was issued in May 1964.

== Captures ==
=== Roger Cordrey ===
The first gang member to be caught was Roger Cordrey. He was with his friend, William Boal, who was helping him lie low in return for the payment of old debts. They were living in a rented flat above a florist's shop in Moordown, Bournemouth. The Bournemouth police were tipped off by Ethel Clark when Boal and Cordrey paid her for three months' rent, in advance on a garage in Tweedale Road. Clark was the widow of a former police officer and Boal and Cordrey made the whole payment in used ten-shilling notes. Boal, who was not involved in the robbery, was sentenced to 24 years and died in prison in 1970. Police later acknowledged that he was the victim of a miscarriage of justice.

=== Others ===
Other arrests followed. Eight of the gang members and several associates were caught. The other arrests were made by Sgt Stan Davis and Probationary Constable Gordon 'Charlie' Case. On Friday 16 August 1963, two people who had decided to take a morning stroll in Dorking Woods discovered a briefcase, a holdall and a camel-skin bag, all containing money. They called police, who also discovered another briefcase full of money in the woods. In total, a sum of £100,900 was found. They also found a camel-skin bag containing a receipt from a hotel Sonnenbichel in the German town of Bad Hindelang in the Bavarian Prealps. It was made out to Herr and Frau Field. Surrey police delivered the money and the receipt to Fewtrell and McArthur in Aylesbury, who knew by then that Brian Field was a clerk at James and Wheater who had acted in the purchase of Leatherslade Farm. They quickly confirmed through Interpol that Brian and Karin Field had stayed at Sonnenbichel in February that year. The police knew that Field had acted for Gordon Goody and other criminals.

Several weeks later, the police went to Field's house to interview him. He calmly (for someone whose relatives had dumped a large part of the loot) provided a cover story that implicated Lennie Field as the purchaser of the farm and his boss John Wheater as the conveyancer. He admitted to visiting the farm on one occasion with Lennie Field, but said he assumed it was an investment of his brother Alexander Field, whom Brian Field had defended (unsuccessfully) in a recent court case. Field, not knowing the police had found a receipt, readily confirmed that he and his wife had been to Germany on a holiday and gave them the details of the place at which they had stayed. On 15 September 1963 Brian Field was arrested and his boss John Wheater was arrested two days later. Lennie Field had already been arrested on 14 September. Jack Slipper was involved in the capture of Roy James, Ronald Biggs, Jimmy Hussey and John Daly.

== Trial, 1964 ==
The trial of the robbers began at Aylesbury Assizes, Buckinghamshire, on 20 January 1964. Because it would be necessary to accommodate a large number of lawyers and journalists, the existing court was deemed too small and so the offices of Aylesbury Rural District Council were specially converted for the event. The defendants were brought to the court each day from Aylesbury Prison in a compartmentalised van, out of view of the large crowd of spectators. Mr Justice Edmund Davies presided over the trial, which lasted 51 days and included 613 exhibits and 240 witnesses. The jury retired to the Grange Youth Centre in Aylesbury to consider its verdict.

On 11 February 1964, there was a sensation when John Daly was found to have no case to answer. His counsel, Walter Raeburn QC, claimed that the evidence against his client was limited to his fingerprints being on the Monopoly set found at Leatherslade Farm and the fact that he went underground after the robbery. Raeburn went on to say that Daly had played the Monopoly game with his brother-in-law Bruce Reynolds earlier in 1963, and that he had gone underground only because he was associated with people publicly sought by the police. This was not proof of involvement in a conspiracy. The judge agreed, and the jury was directed to acquit him.

Detective Inspector Frank Williams was shocked when this occurred because, owing to Tommy Butler's refusal to share information, he had no knowledge of the fact that Daly's prints were only on the Monopoly set. If Williams had known this, he could have asked Daly questions about the Monopoly set and robbed him of his very effective alibi. Daly was clever in avoiding having a photo taken when he was arrested until he could shave his beard. This meant that there was no photo to show the lengths he had gone to in order to change his appearance. No action was taken against Butler for his mistake in not ensuring the case against Daly was more thorough.

On 15 April 1964 the proceedings ended with the judge describing the robbery as "a crime of sordid violence inspired by vast greed" and passing sentences of 30 years' imprisonment on seven of the robbers.

=== Sentencing ===
The 11 men sentenced all felt aggrieved at the sentences handed down, particularly Bill Boal (who died in prison) and Lennie Field, who were later found not guilty of the charges against them. The other men (aside from Wheater) resented what they considered to be the excessive length of the sentences, which were longer than those given to many murderers or armed robbers. Train robbers who were sentenced later, and by different judges, received shorter terms. The severity of the sentences caused some surprise. When mastermind Bruce Reynolds was arrested in 1968, he allegedly told arresting officer Tommy Butler that those sentences had had a detrimental effect. According to him, they had prompted criminals generally to take guns with them when they set out on robberies.

Name	Age	Occupation	Sentence
John Thomas Daly	32	antiques dealer	No case to answer
Ronald Arthur Biggs	34	carpenter	30 years (25 years for conspiracy to rob and 30 years for armed robbery)
Douglas Gordon Goody	34	hairdresser	30 years (25 years for conspiracy to rob and 30 years for armed robbery)
Charles Frederick Wilson	31	market trader	30 years (25 years for conspiracy to rob and 30 years for armed robbery)
Thomas William Wisbey	34	bookmaker	30 years (25 years for conspiracy to rob and 30 years for armed robbery)
Robert Welch	34	club proprietor	30 years (25 years for conspiracy to rob and 30 years for armed robbery)
James Hussey	34	painter	30 years (25 years for conspiracy to rob and 30 years for armed robbery)
Roy John James	28	racing motorist and silversmith	30 years (25 years for conspiracy to rob and 30 years for armed robbery)
Roger John Cordrey	42	florist	20 years (20 years for conspiracy to rob and various receiving stolen goods charges)
Brian Arthur Field	29	solicitor's clerk	25 years (20 years for conspiracy to rob and 5 years for obstructing justice)
Leonard Denis Field	31	merchant seaman	25 years (20 years for conspiracy to rob and 5 years for obstructing justice)
John Denby Wheater	41	solicitor	3 years (Aiding and abetting a crime)
William Gerald Boal	50	engineer	24 years

=== Appeals, July 1964 ===
On 13 July 1964, the appeals by Lennie Field and Brian Field (no relation) against the charges of conspiracy to rob were allowed. This resulted in their sentences being in effect reduced to five years only. On 14 July 1964, the appeals by Roger Cordrey and Bill Boal were allowed, with the convictions for conspiracy to rob quashed, leaving only the receiving charges. Justice Fenton Atkinson concluded that a miscarriage of justice would result if Boal's charges were upheld, given that his age, physique and temperament made him an unlikely train robber. Luckily for him, as the oldest robber, Cordrey was also deemed to be not guilty of the conspiracy because his prints had not been found at Leatherslade Farm.

Brian Field was only reluctantly acquitted of the robbery. Justice Atkinson stated that he would not be surprised if Field were not only part of the conspiracy, but also one of the robbers. The charges against the other men were all upheld. In the end, Lennie Field and Bill Boal got some measure of justice, but Boal died in prison in 1970 after a long illness.

== Prison escapes ==
On 12 August 1964, Wilson escaped from Winson Green Prison in Birmingham in under three minutes, the escape being considered unprecedented in that a three-man team had broken into the prison to extricate him. His escape team was never caught and the leader, nicknamed "Frenchy", had disappeared from the London criminal scene by the late 1960s. Two weeks after his escape Wilson was in Paris for plastic surgery. By November 1965, Wilson was in Mexico City visiting old friends Bruce Reynolds and Buster Edwards. Wilson's escape was yet another dramatic twist in the train robbery saga.

Eleven months after Wilson's escape, in July 1965, Biggs escaped from Wandsworth Prison, 15 months into his sentence. A furniture van was parked alongside the prison walls and a ladder was dropped over the 30-foot-high wall into the prison during outside exercise time, allowing four prisoners to escape, including Biggs. The escape was planned by recently released prisoner Paul Seaborne, with the assistance of two other ex-convicts, Ronnie Leslie and Ronnie Black, with support from Biggs's wife, Charmian. The plot saw two other prisoners interfere with the warders, and allow Biggs and friend Eric Flower to escape. Seaborne was later caught by Butler and sentenced to four-and-a-half years; Ronnie Leslie received three years for being the getaway driver. The two other prisoners who took advantage of the Biggs escape were captured after three months. Biggs and Flower paid a significant sum of money to be smuggled to Paris for plastic surgery. Biggs said he had to escape because of the length of the sentence and what he alleged to be the severity of the prison conditions.

== Pursuit of fugitives ==
Jimmy White – With the other robbers on the run and having fled the country, only White was at large in the United Kingdom. White was a renowned locksmith/thief and had already been on the run for 10 years before the robbery. He was said to have "a remarkable ability to be invisible, to merge with his surroundings and become the ultimate Mr Nobody." He was a wartime paratrooper and a veteran of Arnhem. According to Piers Paul Read in his 1978 book The Train Robbers, he was "a solitary thief, not known to work with either firm, he should have had a good chance of remaining undetected altogether, yet was known to be one of the Train Robbers almost at once—first by other criminals and then by the police". He was unfortunate in that Brian Field's relatives had dumped luggage containing £100,000 only a mile from a site where White had bought a caravan and hidden £30,000 in the panelling. In addition, a group of men purporting to be from the Flying Squad broke into his flat and took a briefcase containing £8,500. Throughout his three years on the run with wife Sheree and baby son Stephen, he was taken advantage of or let down by friends and associates. On 10 April 1966, a new friend recognised him from photos in a newspaper and informed the police. They arrested him at Littlestone while he was at home; he had just £8,000 left to hand back to them. He was tried in June 1966 at Leicester Assizes and Mr Justice Nield sentenced him to 18 years' jail, considerably less than the 30 years given to other principal offenders.

Buster Edwards – Edwards fled to Mexico with his family, to join Bruce Reynolds (and later Charlie Wilson) but returned voluntarily to England in 1966, where he was sentenced to 15 years.

Charlie Wilson – Wilson took up residence outside Montreal, Quebec, Canada, on Rigaud Mountain in an upper-middle-class neighbourhood where the large, secluded properties are surrounded by trees. He lived under the name Ronald Alloway, a name borrowed from a Fulham shopkeeper. His wife and three children soon joined him. He joined an exclusive golf club and participated in the activities of the local community. It was only when he invited his brother-in-law over from the UK for Christmas that Scotland Yard was able to track him down and recapture him. They waited three months before making their move, in the hope that Wilson would lead them to Reynolds, the last suspect still to be apprehended. Wilson was arrested on 25 January 1968 by Tommy Butler. Many in Rigaud petitioned that his wife and three daughters be allowed to stay in the Montreal area.

Bruce Reynolds – On 6 June 1964, Reynolds arrived in Mexico, with his wife Angela and son Nick joining him a few months later, after they evaded the obvious police surveillance. A year later in July 1965, Buster Edwards and his family arrived, although unlike the Reynolds family they planned to return to England at some stage, and did not like Mexico. Charlie Wilson, on the run with his family still back in England, visited them for six weeks, so three of the train robbers were together in exile for a time. After the Edwards family returned to England, the Reynoldses also decided to leave Mexico and go to Canada to potentially join up with the Wilson family, leaving on 6 December 1966. They had spent much of their share of the robbery by this point – living far more extravagantly than the Edwardses had. After realising the danger in settling near the Wilsons in Montreal, they went to live in Vancouver, and then went to Nice, on the French Riviera. Reynolds did not want to go to Australia where Biggs was, and needing money decided to go back to England, settling briefly in Torquay before being captured by Tommy Butler.

Ronnie Biggs – Biggs fled to Paris, where he acquired new identity papers and underwent plastic surgery. In 1966, he moved to Adelaide, Australia, where he worked as a builder and he and his wife had a third son. Tipped off that Interpol was showing interest, he moved to Melbourne working as a set constructor for Channel 9, later escaping to Rio de Janeiro, Brazil, after police had discovered his Melbourne address. Biggs could not be extradited because there was no extradition treaty between Britain and Brazil, and additionally he became father to a Brazilian son, which afforded him legal immunity. As a result, he lived openly in Rio for many years, safe from the British authorities. In 1981, Biggs's Brazilian son became a member of a successful band Turma do Balão Mágico, but the band quickly faded into obscurity and dissolved.

In May 2001, aged 71 and having suffered three strokes, Biggs voluntarily returned to England. Accepting that he could be arrested, his stated desire was to "walk into a Margate pub as an Englishman and buy a pint of bitter". Arrested on landing, after detention and a short court hearing he was sent back to prison to serve the remainder of his sentence. On 2 July 2009, Biggs was denied parole by Justice Secretary Jack Straw, who considered Biggs to be still "wholly unrepentant", but was released from custody on 6 August, two days before his 80th birthday, on 'compassionate grounds'. He died on 18 December 2013, aged 84.

== Fate of the robbers ==
=== Captured ===
Following the deaths of Goody on 29 January 2016, and Tommy Wisbey on 30 December 2016, Bob Welch was the last known member of the gang known alive prior to his death on 2 November 2023. In later years, the robbers generally came together only for the funerals of their fellow gang members. Wilson's funeral on 10 May 1990 was attended by Bruce Reynolds, who reported seeing Edwards, Roy James (who got into a verbal argument with the press), Welch (hobbling on crutches) and White. At Edwards' funeral in 1994, Reynolds saw only Welch (Hussey, Wisbey and James were in prison).

==== Brian Field ====
After being sentenced on 16 April 1964, Field served four years of his five-year sentence. He was released in 1967. While he was in prison, his wife Karin divorced him and married a German journalist. Karin wrote an article for the German magazine Stern. She confirmed that she took Roy James to Thame railway station so he could go to London and that she led a convoy of two vans back to her house, where the gang were joined by wives and girlfriends for a big party to celebrate the crime. When Reynolds returned to the UK in 1968, he tried to contact Field as this was the only way he could get in touch with the "Ulsterman". It seems that Field was ambushed upon his release from prison by a recently released convict, "Scotch Jack" Buggy, who presumably roughed up or even tortured Field with a view to extorting some of the loot from the robbery. Subsequently, Field went to ground and Buggy was killed shortly after. Reynolds gave up trying to find Field.

Field changed his name to Brian Carlton to disappear. Sometime after his release from prison he married Sian, from Wales. In the mid/late 1970s, they worked for the Children's Book Centre (since sold) in Kensington High Street, London. Field and his wife Sian were responsible for the company's operations in central and southern Europe, to where they shipped English language books and held book fairs at international English schools. Field, aged 44, and Sian, aged 28, died in a car crash on the M4 motorway on 27 April 1979, a year after the last of the robbers had completed their sentences. The accident occurred as they returned from a visit to Sian's parents in Wales. A Mercedes driven by Amber Bessone, the pregnant 28-year-old daughter of a well-known hairdresser Raymond Bessone (Mr Teasy Weasy) crossed a damaged section of the guard rail and slammed into Field's oncoming Porsche. The Fields, Amber, her husband and two children were all killed instantly. It was several weeks after the accident that Field's true identity was discovered. It is not clear whether his wife Sian ever knew of his past.

==== Charlie Wilson ====
The last of the robbers released, (after serving about one-third of his sentence) Wilson returned to the life of crime and was found shot dead at his villa in Marbella, Spain, on 24 April 1990. His murder was thought to be related to suspected cheating in drug-dealing. He is buried in Streatham cemetery.

==== Buster Edwards ====
After he was released, he became a flower seller outside Waterloo station. His story was dramatised in the 1988 film Buster, with Phil Collins in the title role. Edwards died by suicide, hanging himself in a garage in November 1994. His family continued to run the flower stall after his death.

==== Roy James ====
James went back to motor racing following his release on 15 August 1975. However, he crashed several cars and his chances of becoming a driver quickly faded. After the failure of his sporting career, he returned to his trade as a silversmith. He produced the trophy given to Formula One promoters each year thanks to his acquaintance with Bernie Ecclestone. In 1982, he married a younger woman, but the marriage soon broke down. By 1983, James and Charlie Wilson had become involved in an attempt to import gold without paying excise duty. James was acquitted in January 1984 for his part in the swindle. In 1993, he shot and wounded his father-in-law, pistol-whipped and partially strangled his ex-wife, after they had returned their children for a day's outing. He was sentenced to six years in jail. In 1996, James underwent triple-bypass surgery and was subsequently released from prison in 1997, only to die almost immediately afterwards on 21 August after another heart attack. He was the fifth member of the gang to die, despite being the youngest.

==== Roger Cordrey ====
Cordrey was the first of the robbers released, but his share of the theft had almost entirely been recovered by the police. He went back to being a florist at his sister's business upon his release. He is now dead, and his son Tony has publicly acknowledged his dad confirmed that Bill Boal was innocent of any involvement in the robbery.

==== Bruce Reynolds ====
Bruce Reynolds, the last of the robbers to be caught, was released from prison on 6 June 1978 after serving 10 years. Reynolds, then aged 47, was helped by Gordon Goody to get back on his feet, before Goody departed for Spain. By October 1978, day-release ended and he had to report to a parole officer. Frank Monroe, one of the three robbers who was never caught, temporarily gave Reynolds a job, but did not want to attract undue attention by employing him for too long. Reynolds later got back together with his wife Angela and son Nicholas. He was arrested in 1983 for drug-related offences (Reynolds denied having any involvement). He was released again in March 1985 and dedicated himself to helping his wife recover from a mental breakdown. In 2001, he and his son Nicholas travelled with reporters from The Sun newspaper to take Biggs back to Britain. In 2010, he wrote the afterword for Signal Red, Robert Ryan's novel based on the robbery, and he regularly commented on the robbery. He died in his sleep, aged 81, on 28 February 2013.

==== John Daly ====
Upon his acquittal and release, and after finding his share of the loot stolen and/or destroyed, Daly gave up his life of crime and went "straight". He and his wife Barbara and their three children moved to Cornwall, where he worked as a street sweeper until the age of 70, known to the locals as Gentleman John or John the Gent. Daly told no one about the robbery as he was told he could face a retrial. He died six weeks after his brother-in-law Reynolds.

==== Ronnie Biggs ====
On 6 August 2009, Biggs was granted release from prison on "compassionate grounds", due to a severe case of pneumonia and other ongoing health problems. In 2011 he updated his autobiography, Odd Man Out: The Last Straw. Having suffered a series of strokes after his release, and unable to speak for the previous three years, Biggs died at the Carlton Court Care home, London on 18 December 2013.

==== Tommy Wisbey and Big Jim Hussey ====
Tommy Wisbey was luckier than most of the others, in that his loot had been entrusted to his brothers, and when he emerged, he had a house in South London and a few other investments to keep him going. During his prison stint, his daughter Lorraine had died in a car accident. He took a while to learn how to live harmoniously with his wife Rene (his daughter Marilyn having moved out upon his return). Shortly after his release, Wisbey was imprisoned on remand over a swindle involving travellers' cheques. The judge acknowledged the minor nature of his role.

Jim Hussey was released on 17 November 1975 and married girlfriend Gill (whom he had met just before the robbery). Hussey's share of the loot had been entrusted to a friend of Frank Monroe who squandered it despite Monroe periodically checking on its keeper.

Wisbey was arrested in 1981 as part of a major criminal investigation into ongoing large scale mail thefts conducted by CID officers from British Transport Police Headquarters. He was subsequently charged and convicted of handling a small quantity of travellers cheques, part of a stolen consignment valued at over 2.5 million dollars (American Express). The officer in charge of the case - Detective Inspector Graham Satchwell.

Wisbey and Hussey fell back into crime and were jailed in 1989 for cocaine dealing, with Wisbey sentenced to 10 years and Hussey to seven years. In her book Gangster's Moll, Marilyn Wisbey recounts that on 8 June 1988, after returning home from a visit to an abortion clinic and resting they were raided by the Drugs Squad. The raid uncovered 1 kg of cocaine and Rene and Marilyn Wisbey were arrested along with Jimmy Hussey, who had been spotted accepting a package from Wisbey in a park. Wisbey himself was captured a year later in Wilmslow, Cheshire. He was allegedly staying with another woman, to the shock of his wife and daughter. In return for Hussey and Wisbey pleading guilty, the two women were unconditionally freed. Upon their release from prison, both men retired from work.

Wisbey later explained: "We were against drugs all our lives, but as the years went on, towards the end of the '70s, it became more and more the 'in' thing. Being involved in the Great Train Robbery, our name was good. They knew we had never grassed anyone, we had done our time without putting anyone else in the frame". On 26 July 1989, the two men pleaded guilty and admitted at Snaresbrook Crown Court, London that they were a part of a £500,000 cocaine trafficking ring. Wisbey's grandson has also had trouble with the law in Cyprus.

==== Bob Welch ====
Bob Welch (March 1929 - November 2023) was released on 14 June 1976. He was the last of those convicted in Aylesbury to be released. Welch moved back in with his wife June and his son. He threatened the man left in charge of his share of the theft to retrieve the remainder. A leg injury sustained in prison forced him to undergo several operations, which left him disabled. He died in 2023 following a battle with alzheimer's.

==== Douglas (Gordon) Goody ====
He was released from prison on 23 December 1975, aged 46 and went to live with his ill mother in her small cottage in Putney. Unlike the other robbers, he was exceptionally lucky in that the man he left in charge of his affairs was loyal and successful so he was able to live a relatively well-off life. In his final years of incarceration Goody had taken full benefit of the newly established education college at Wormwood Scrubbs and studied Spanish to GCE standard.

He later moved to Mojacar, southern Spain, where he bought property and a bar and settled down, believing it safer to be out of the United Kingdom. He was at one point accused of cannabis smuggling but ultimately cleared. He continued to live in Mojacar until his death on 29 January 2016, following an illness.

=== Escaped ===
While there has been a lot of mystery surrounding several of the gang who were not imprisoned, in reality, the police knew almost the entire gang almost instantly. By 29 August 1963 Commander Hatherill had 14 names, and told police that Brian Field had tried to enlist another gang to rob the train, who turned him down. Hatherill's list was unerringly accurate—all the major gang members who were later jailed were identified, except Ronnie Biggs. With the exception of the minor accomplices Lennie Field, Bill Boal and the train driver, the list was complete, although of course "The Ulsterman" was not identified. In terms of the ones who got away, there were four others identified: Harry Smith, Danny Pembroke, a fair-haired man (25 years old and well-spoken, not named) and a nondescript man (not named but maybe Jimmy Collins).

In 2019, Pembroke's son, also called Danny, confirmed that his father was present during the raid. He escaped detection as he always wore gloves, including at the hideout at the farm, and went outside to the toilet rather than using the one inside the house. The son stated that Pembroke, whose share of the loot was £150,000 (about £3 million in 2019), died in 2015 aged 79.

Both Piers Paul Read and Bruce Reynolds refer to three robbers who got away as Bill Jennings, Alf Thomas and Frank Monroe.

==== Bill 'Flossy' Jennings a.k.a. Mr One ====
Piers Paul Read refers to this man as Bill Jennings in The Train Robbers, while Bruce Reynolds adds a nickname, 'Flossy'. Ronnie Biggs refers to him as Mr One, as do other accounts. According to Bruce Reynolds, "Flossy had no previous convictions and stayed well out of contact with the group. A shadowy figure, nobody knew exactly where he lived—or even what his real name was. All we knew that he was one hundred per cent, and was sure to last out the hullabaloo. The last report of him said that he was in a safe house, banged up with two gorgeous girls and enough champagne to sink a battleship."

It is clear that while Reynolds claims to not have known his real name, 'Flossy' was not just a participant in the Great Train Robbery, he was a core part of the gang who participated in the London Airport robbery. This robbery was the audacious raid that Gordon Goody and Charlie Wilson were acquitted of. That raid consisted of Roy James and Mickey Ball as the getaway drivers, with six robbers—Bruce Reynolds, Buster Edwards, Gordon Goody, Charlie Wilson, Flossy (and a sixth man who did not participate in the train robbery). In the end, the only one caught after the airport raid was Mickey Ball, who pleaded guilty to being a getaway driver when a witness mistook him for Flossy, and to avoid being blamed for the actual violence he agreed to plead guilty as an accomplice, and was in prison during the Great Train Robbery. He was given £500 from the proceeds of the Train Robbery.

Henry Thomas 'Harry' Smith (born 20 October 1930) is believed to be Flossy, and unlike most other robbers, actually got to spend his share of the loot, buying 28 houses, a hotel and drinking club in Portsmouth. Smith died in 2008. Smith was the only man not ultimately arrested that was on both the Hatherill list and Tommy Butler's list.

==== Danny Pembroke (Frank Monroe) ====
Danny Pembroke was an ex-army man who was a South London taxi driver and a South Coast Raider. At Leatherslade Farm he was the most careful of the gang, and nothing was ever found to associate him with the robbery, despite the police being satisfied that he was one of the gang, and had searched his house in September 1963. However, afraid that he would be betrayed, he did a deal with Frank Williams and paid back £47,245. Following the robbery, Pembroke left for America for a couple of years, knowing he was set up for life, and then returned to live quietly in Kent. He died aged 79 from a heart attack, at home and in his sleep on 28 February 2015. Pembroke had five children, and his son Danny Jr., admitted to his involvement in a documentary in Channel 4's Secret History series, broadcast in August 2019. According to Bruce Reynolds, Monroe, who was never caught, worked as a film stunt man for a while before starting a paper and scrap metal recycling business.

==== The Replacement Train Driver a.k.a. Pops/Dad a.k.a. Peter a.k.a. Stan Agate ====
The replacement train driver was never caught, and never suspected of even existing by police, due to the fact that Jack Mills in the end had to drive the train. He also never profited from the crime, as Ronnie Biggs never paid him his £20,000 "drink". The driver, of course, was not a member of the gang (as defined by receiving an equal share), just an accomplice.

Piers Paul Read called the replacement train driver "Stan Agate", and Stan was apparently the true nickname of the replacement driver. Read, concerned that the robbers may have hurt him, went to see Ronnie Biggs in Brazil to get his details, although was dismayed to find that Biggs did not know his last name and knew and cared very little about him. With the meagre details provided, Read used a detective agency to track down the driver at a town 20 miles south of London, and found that he was still alive, although somewhat senile and being cared for by his wife. The wife admitted that she had burnt all the clothes that he had worn that night, and had nervously waited for either the gang to murder him or the police to arrest him. Read promised not to reveal their identities. Unlike the other three members of the gang who got away, Peta Fordham does make mention of the replacement driver, but notes that he is said now to be dead, perhaps the robbers who provided material for the book did not want the police looking for him, as at the time of publishing (1965) Reynolds, White and Edwards were still on the run.

Ronnie Biggs, in his 1994 autobiography, Odd Man Out, said that Bruce Reynolds offered him a chance to join the gang if he could find a train driver. Biggs was renewing the front windows of a train driver's house in Redhill, who he calls 'Peter' (and whom he believes to be dead by 1994). Ronnie offers him a £40,000 share of the profits, tells Reynolds and gives his address to John Daly who then proceeds to check him out. It seems that while he was an older man, he still had to apply for two weeks leave of absence from his job. According to Biggs, 'Peter' was paid his £40,000 'drink', although other accounts claim otherwise. Biggs states that Mary Manson drove 'Peter' and John Daly home, while Reynolds drove Biggs home.

=== Accomplices ===
John Wheater was released from prison on 11 February 1966 and managed his family's laundry business in Harrogate. He later wrote two articles in the Sunday Telegraph, which published the first one on 6 March 1966. He died in July 1985.

Lenny Field was released in 1967 and went to live in North London. He disappeared from the public eye.

Mary Manson, an associate of Bruce Reynolds and John Daly, was charged with receiving £820 from the robbery; she was held for six weeks but was released. Mary took care of wives and children of some of the robbers while they were on the run or in jail.

== Fate of the victims ==
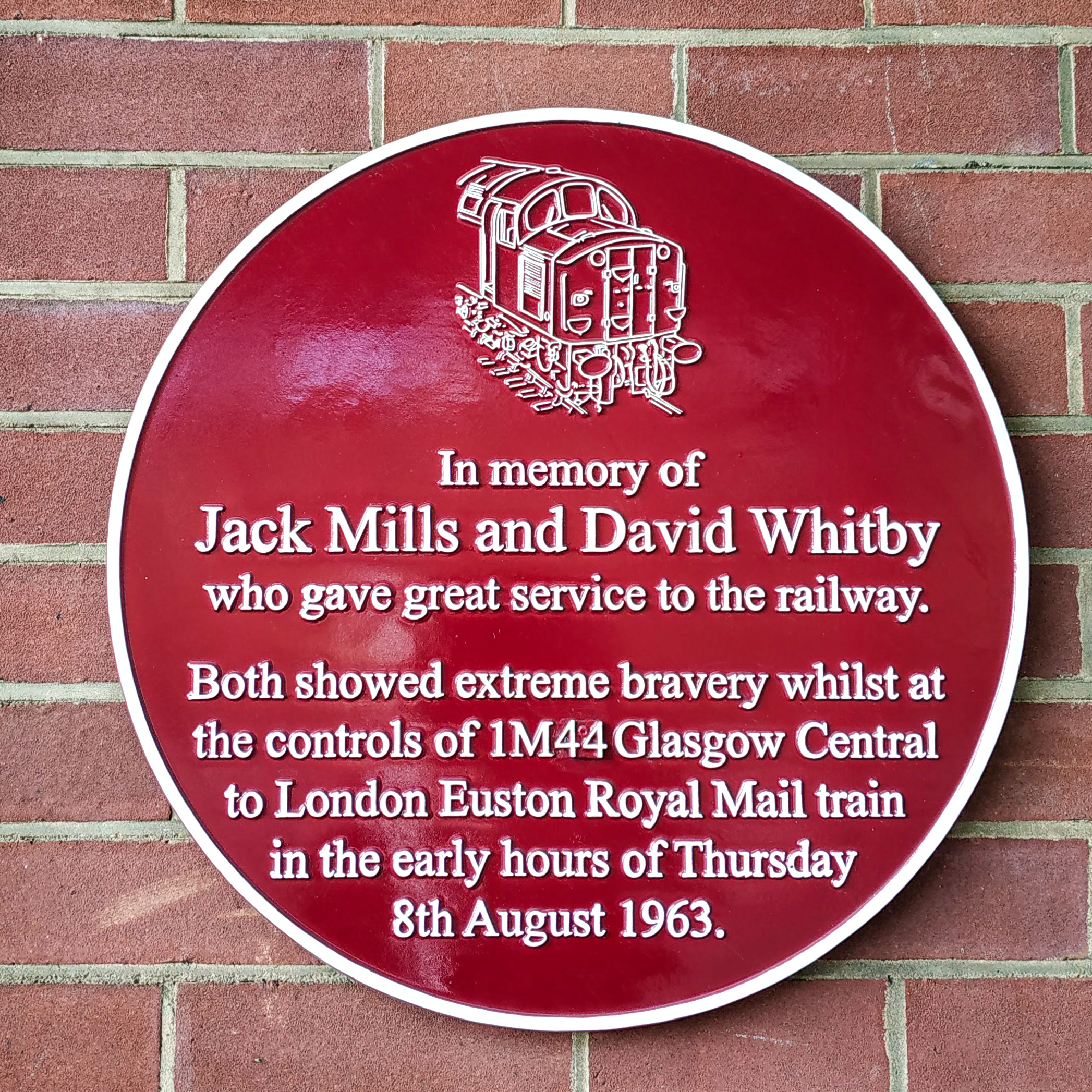
Memorial plaque to Mills and Whitby at Crewe railway station

=== Jack Mills ===
Mills had constant trauma headaches for the rest of his life, before dying of leukemia in 1970. Mills's assailant was one of three members of the gang that were never identified by the others. However, in November 2012, Hussey made a death-bed confession that it was him, although there were suspicions that this was repayment of a debt, to divert attention from the real perpetrator.

Class 90 electric locomotive number 90 036 was named Driver Jack Mills at Crewe station on 2 December 2014. In 2025, the name was transferred to DB Cargo locomotive 66126, following the withdrawal of the Class 90 in 2023. A road in Crewe was named Jack Mills Way in 2015.

Frank Williams (at the time a detective inspector) claimed that at least three men who were directly involved are still at liberty and enjoying their full share of the money stolen and the profits from the way they invested it, one of them being the man responsible for the attack on the train driver. Williams said that the train driver's assailant was not some phantom figure lurking in the criminal underworld, and that he traced him, identified him and took him to Scotland Yard where, with Tommy Butler, Williams questioned him. He could not be charged because of lack of evidence; there were no fingerprints or identifiable marks anywhere. None of those arrested informed on this person, although it was claimed that he had completely disobeyed instructions and used violence during the robbery.

=== David Whitby ===
David Whitby (24 January 1937 – 6 January 1972) was also from Crewe. He was traumatised by his track-side assault and subsequent rough treatment and never recovered from his ordeal. He was 26 years old at the time of the robbery. He was able to resume his job as a secondman, but died from a heart attack on 6 January 1972 at the age of 34 in Crewe, Cheshire.

=== Bill Boal ===
Engineer William Gerald "Bill" Boal (22 October 1913 – 26 June 1970), an accomplice after the fact of Roger Cordrey. He was considered so at the time because he knew Cordrey and moreover was found in Cordrey's car where a large stash of the stolen money was hidden. He died in jail of cancer. His family are now trying to have his name cleared, as they believe, based on evidence not used in the original trial, that Boal was at best an accomplice after the fact with no knowledge of the robbery, and that it was likely that Cordrey told him nothing about the provenance of the cash. Furthermore, both Ronnie Biggs and Gordon Goody, two surviving gang members at the time, gave sworn affidavits asserting that Boal was innocent. Both gang members stated that they believed Boal was "stitched up" by the police.

== Aftermath ==
The audacity and scale of the robbery was yet another controversy with which the Conservative government of Harold Macmillan had to cope. Macmillan resigned in October 1963, claiming poor health—he had been diagnosed with prostate cancer and believed he did not have long to live, but the diagnosis turned out to be incorrect. He did not contest his seat at the next election in September 1964, which the Labour Party won under Harold Wilson.

After his success in securing White and Edwards, Tommy Butler got the Metropolitan Police Commissioner, Sir Joseph Simpson, to suspend his retirement on his 55th birthday so he could continue to hunt the robbers. This paid off with the arrests of first Wilson, then Reynolds. When asked by a reporter after the sentencing of Reynolds whether that was the end of it, Butler replied that it was not over until Biggs was caught. In 1969 he was finally forced to accept compulsory retirement, and later died in 1970, aged 57. That same day, Biggs' memoirs were published in The Sun newspaper.

Butler's deputy, Frank Williams, was passed over to be his replacement as head of the Flying Squad because of his deal with Pembroke (which he thought would seal his promotion) and his deal with another of the robbers who was never caught. Following this, he left the force to become head of security for the airline Qantas. He wrote his autobiography No Fixed Address, which was published in 1973.

Jack Slipper of the Metropolitan Police was promoted to detective chief superintendent. He became so involved in the case that he continued to hunt many of the escaped robbers after he retired. He believed Biggs should not be released after returning to the UK in 2001 and he often appeared in the media to comment on any news item connected with the robbery before his death on 24 August 2005 at the age of 81.

Detective Chief Superintendent Ernest Malcolm Fewtrell, head of the Buckinghamshire Crime Investigation Department (CID) was born on 29 September 1909 and died on 28 November 2005, aged 96. He retired on the last day of the trial after the verdicts were handed down at the then compulsory retirement age of 55. This allowed him (with Ronald Payne of The Sunday Telegraph, who was involved in the paper's coverage of the case) to be the first of the investigators to write a book The Train Robbers on the robbery investigation in 1964. In the book, he expressed some frustration with the Flying Squad although he mostly had praise for individual officers. His one regret was that he had the search for the hideout carried out radiating outwards from the scene of the robbery rather than an inwards search from a 30-mile (50 km) perimeter. He worked as an accommodation officer for Portsmouth Polytechnic before retiring to live by the sea near Swanage. He continued to express disgust at any film that he felt glamourised the robbers. It has been said that he bore a striking resemblance to John Thaw, who was the star of Inspector Morse, which, perhaps coincidentally, was a television series about a detective in the Thames Valley Police Force (the modern-day successor to Buckinghamshire Constabulary). Fewtrell was assisted and later succeeded in the investigation by John Woolley, who served in the Buckinghamshire Constabulary from 1959 to 1984.

George Hatherill (1898–1986) had his service extended by one year because of the need to complete the investigation of the Great Train Robbery. He visited Canada and the US as a lecturer on police matters. He died on 17 June 1986 at the age of 87.

Gerald MacArthur died aged 70 on 21 July 1996. He was famous for breaking up the Richardson Gang at a time when a significant number of London-based detectives were known to be corrupt.

=== Crime scene ===
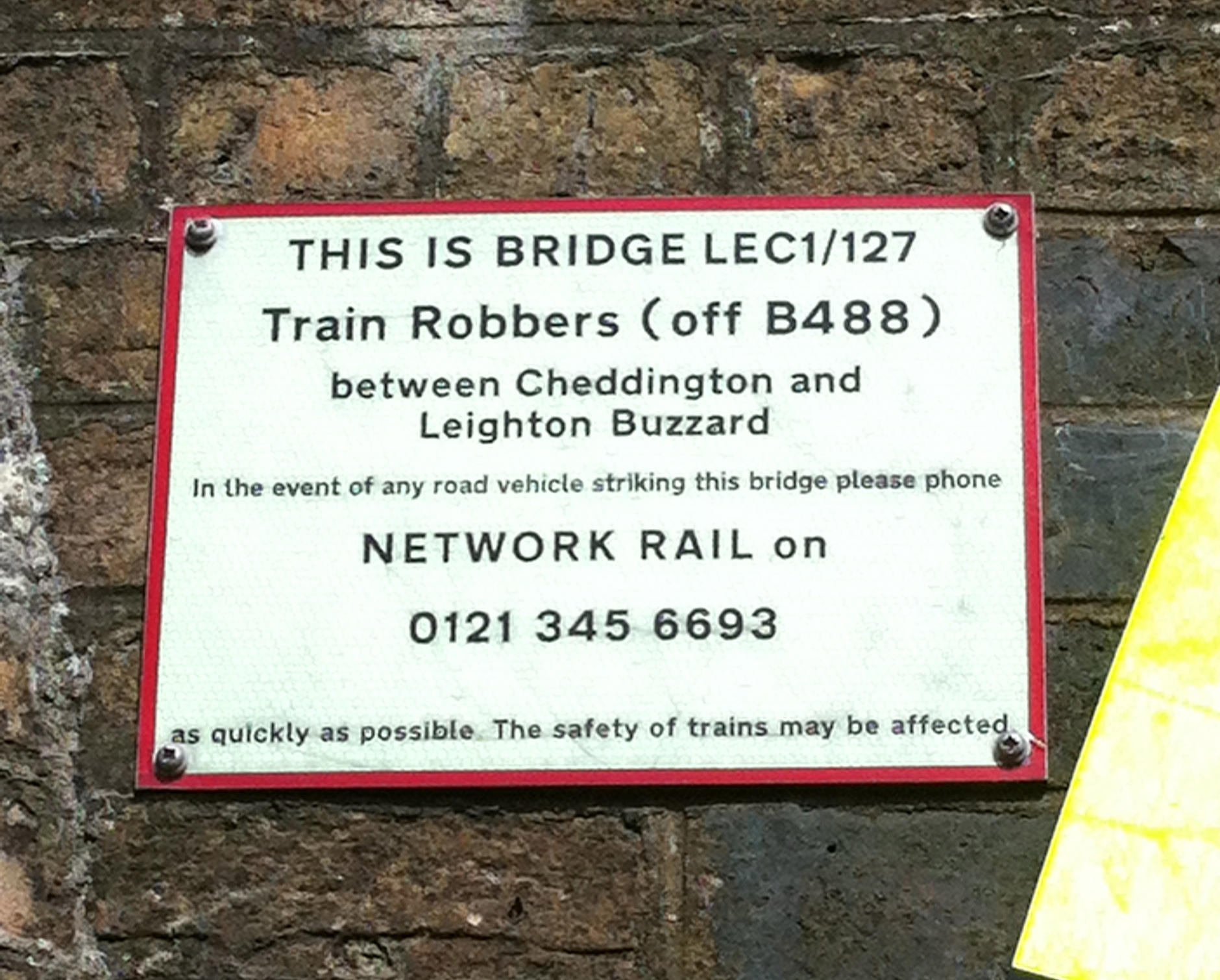
Train Robbers Bridge Network Rail identification plate

One of the Post Office carriages that was part of the remaining train (not involved in the actual robbery) is preserved at the Nene Valley Railway at Peterborough, Cambridgeshire, and is being restored. The actual carriage that was robbed [M30204M] was retained for seven years following the robbery, and then taken to Norfolk and burned in the presence of police and Post Office representatives at a scrapyard near Norwich in 1970. This was to deter collector/souvenir hunters. Locomotive English Electric Type 4 – D326 (later 40126) was involved in a number of serious fatal operating incidents, and it became somewhat jinxed amongst railway crews. Unusually the locomotive was hastily scrapped at Doncaster Railway workshops in 1984, out of respect for the railway workers. The retrieved Monopoly board used by the robbers at their Leatherslade Farm hideout and a genuine £5 note from the robbery are on display at the Thames Valley Police museum in Sulhamstead, Berkshire.

For some years, Network Rail described the location of the robbery as "Train Robbers' bridge" in their infrastructure records, and a structure identification plate showing this was attached to the bridge. This led to an outcry advocating restoration of the original name of Bridego Bridge. In late 2013 Network Rail bowed to public pressure, but this time named it Mentmore Bridge. The sign was replaced around 2017.

== Recovery of the money ==
£2,631,684 was stolen (although the police report says £2,595,997). The bulk of the haul was in £1 notes and £5 notes (both the older white note and the newer blue note which was half its size). The £5 notes were bundled in batches of £2,500, the £1 notes in batches of £500. There were also ten-shilling notes in batches of £250. A quantity of Irish and Scottish money was also stolen. With the exception of a few 'drinks' for associates, the loot was split into 17 equal shares of around £150,000 each (George Hatherill claims that there were 18 shares).

With a few notable exceptions, the money was quickly laundered or divided among friends, family and associates of the robbers. Much was laundered through bookmakers (Wilson and Wisbey were themselves bookmakers) although, astonishingly, only a few hundred pounds were identifiable by serial numbers, so the robbers could have spent the money without fear of being traced. Only 1,579 notes had known serial numbers, so the rest of the money was completely untraceable.

The £5 notes were of two different types because, in 1957, the British Government had begun to replace the large white notes with smaller blue ones. The final changeover had not been completed by the time of the robbery, but the white notes quickly became far more conspicuous, making it harder for them to be spent.

Although ten of the robbers were locked up within six months of the robbery, awaiting trial, and three others were wanted criminals on the run, very little of the money had been recovered. That has led to speculation that a great deal of the loot is still unaccounted for. In fact, the money was soon seized and spent by predatory gangsters and greedy associates, relatives and lawyers. Thus the proceeds of the greatest cash robbery in British history were quickly used up, with few of the robbers receiving any long-term benefit.

Less than £400,000 was eventually recovered. Over half of that consisted of the shares of Roger Cordrey (£141,017) and (allegedly) Brian Field (£100,900). A further £36,000 was recovered from Jimmy White's caravan. Roy James was carrying £12,041 when captured. £47,245 was found in a telephone box in Great Dover Street, Newington, South London.

=== Telephone box controversy ===
The £47,245 recovered from the telephone box included 57 notes, the serial numbers of which had been recorded by the bank in Scotland. That money was part of a deal struck with Frank Williams by Danny Pembroke. In his book,The Train Robbers, Piers Paul Read claimed that the police were feeling the pressure because, although they had caught many of the robbers, they had failed to recover much of the money. While no evidence had been found against Pembroke, who was believed to have been one of the South Coast Raiders, some of the identifiable bank notes had been traced back to him through friends who had been charged with receiving. Given that the police had insufficient evidence against Pembroke, either at Leatherslade Farm or definitive connection with either of the two gangs, Butler was prepared to let him go. Williams convinced Butler to pull Pembroke in for questioning and, in return for releasing him and not charging his friends with more serious crimes, £50,000 was to be returned.

On 3 December 1963, which happened to be the same day that Roy James was taken into custody, the police received an anonymous tip directing them to the money in the phone box. The money was driven up to Aylesbury and taken into custody by Detective Superintendent Fewtrell, who wondered how his London colleagues could know how much money there was. He had to bring in bank clerks to count the damp and musty money to determine the final sum.

Williams made no admission to the recovery of the money being the result of a deal with Pembroke. Despite claiming that his negotiations were responsible for the return of this money, Williams in his book No Fixed Address (1973) claimed not to know the identity of the person who had returned the money, although he did mention several robbers to whom he had offered deals through intermediaries. He noted that it seemed to him that Butler was sceptical of his efforts and that at the press conference Hatherill and Millen did not reveal the circumstances behind the find and that he was never asked to talk with them about it. Despite Pembroke being the man identified as the assailant of the train driver, Jack Mills, by Bruce Reynolds (albeit indirectly), Williams only makes mention of the assailant once in his book. In this section (often quoted by other sources), he confirms that, with Tommy Butler, he questioned the man they knew to be the assailant but that they had no evidence to convict him. Strangely, however, he makes no further mention of him.

The deal done with Pembroke caused outrage in the police hierarchy. It is hinted in several books that the deals done by Williams were responsible for his being overlooked for promotion and that Williams was unhappy that his efforts were not recognised by Butler, but were instead hidden from superiors.

For his part, George Hatherill, in his book A Detective's Tale, stated that the motive behind the return of the money was not known for certain. He said that the money was returned by "one about whom extensive inquiries had been made and who in fact was interrogated at length. But in spite of our strong suspicions, nothing could be proved against him and so no charge could be brought. My belief is that he thought we knew more about him than we did, and thinking things were getting hot, he decided to get rid of the money to avoid being found in possession with it". Hatherill does not mention Williams at all in his book. He retired on the last day of the trial at Aylesbury.

=== Legal fees ===
The 19 gang members who were arrested shortly after the robbery had to spend a large amount on legal fees (approximately £30,000 each).

=== Money spent ===
The robbers who spent much time on the run overseas—Reynolds, Wilson and Edwards—had very little left when finally arrested, having had to spend money avoiding capture and indulging in lavish lifestyles without finding employment. Much of Jimmy White's money was taken from him.

According to Marilyn Wisbey, her father's share was hidden by his father Tommy Wisbey Senior in the panels in the doors of his home. Butler raided them three times but he never found the train money. The majority of the money was reputedly entrusted to Wisbey's father and also to his younger brother Ron, who coincidentally had saved some money of his own that was confiscated by the police and returned to Ron three months later. By the time Wisbey was released from jail all of his share had either been spent or invested. Marilyn agrees with Piers Paul Read's assessment of how her father's share of approximately £150,000 was spent. Although the Wisbey share was one that was not taken by other criminals, Marilyn Wisbey is still bitter that her relatives got to spend a fair amount of the loot while the overall sum dwindled away. However, her grandfather used some of the money to buy them a house in Upper Norwood.

Up to six of the robbers escaped punishment in one way or another - "The Ulsterman", three robbers who were never caught, John Daly who had his charges dismissed at the trial and Ronnie Biggs who escaped from jail and managed to avoid being taken back to the UK. Daly had entrusted his money to another crook. This man had betrayed him to the police and had absconded with the money. He died before Daly could catch up with him. Upon the release of the others in the mid-1970s, "Bill Jennings" got in touch with Buster Edwards and "Frank Monroe" got in touch with the South Coast Raiders. Both said that they had no money left. Danny Pembroke went initially to America and John Daly at the time was said to be living on unemployment benefits in the west of England. Ronnie Biggs quickly spent his share getting a new life. He loved his new life in Australia, although by the time his family arrived in 1966, all but £7,000 had been spent. £55,000 had been paid as a package deal to get him out of the UK. The rest had gone on legal fees and expenses.

== Sources ==
=== Early books ===
These books were written in the immediate aftermath of the 1964 trial and before the capture of several of the gang.

- The Great Train Robbery (1964) by John Gosling and Dennis Craig. The first book about the robbery, it relied on the real-life experience of John Gosling, a former policeman.
- The Robbers' Tale (1965) by Peta Fordham, first published by Hodder & Stoughton, London. It told the story of the robbery only shortly after the conclusion of the initial trial. The author was the wife of one of the lawyers involved in the case. The book mostly involves a description of the trial. The author constantly hints that she knew more than she was prepared to write, yet it was written before most of the facts emerged.

=== Biographies of investigators ===
Books written by senior police in the early 1970s, after their retirement, chiefly present accounts of the investigation, capture, trial and recapture of the robbers.

- The Train Robbers (1964) by Malcolm Fewtrell (with Ronald Payne), first published in London by Arthur Barker Limited.
- A Detective's Story (1971) by George Hatherill, first published in London by Andre Deutsch Limited (ISBN 0-2339-6322-7) is part autobiography and part description on what makes a detective. Chapter 14, the last chapter of the book is dedicated to the Great Train Robbery the final major investigation before Hatherill's retirement.
- Specialist in Crime (1972) by Ernest Millen, first published by George G. Harrap & Co. Ltd (ISBN 0245505075). An autobiography. When he retired, Millen was Deputy Assistant Commissioner of Scotland Yard and Commander of the CID. A unique inside story of his career as a detective.
- No Fixed Abode (1973) by Frank Williams, first published by W. H. Allen & Co Ltd (ISBN 0-4910-0524-5). It tells the story of the aftermath of the robbery from Williams's point of view, in particular describing the mistakes made in the early days by senior officers, and the autocratic nature of Tommy Butler. The book is targeted at Ronnie Biggs in the hope that he will contact Williams for a deal, similar to the one arranged by Buster Edwards. The book mistakenly identifies Bill Boal as a robber (although it concedes his role was a support role), and it also mistakenly identifies Biggs as one of the leaders.
- Slipper of the Yard (1981) by Jack Slipper, first published by Sidgwick and Jackson Ltd (ISBN 0-2839-8702-2). This book is an autobiography of the police career of Jack Slipper, who had retired the year before as one of the best-known and most decorated detectives in the Metropolitan Police Force. It includes a chapter on his participation in the Train Robbery Squad hunting for the robbers, and has details on the arrests of Roy James, John Daly and Jimmy Hussey. It also has a chapter on the mission to recover Ronnie Biggs from Brazil and denounces the press version of events.

=== Biographies of the robbers ===
- Looking for the real Weasel (2024) by Rich Duisberg and published on Amazon (ISBN 979-8-8766-1132-1). This book covers the life of Roy James, with a focus on his motorsport career and life before, and after, the Great Train Robbery.
- Slip Up (1975) by Anthony Delano and first published by Quadrangle / The New York Times Book Co. (ISBN 0-8129-0576-8).
- The Train Robbers (1978) by Piers Paul Read and first published by W.H. Allen and Company (ISBN 0-397-01283-7). This book recounts a very detailed version of the story based on an exclusive account given by eight of the then-paroled robbers (Edwards, Goody, Hussey, Wisby, Welch, James, White and Cordrey with contradictory versions by Reynolds and Biggs). Despite revealing more than previous accounts, the book is flawed in that it includes inaccuracies that the funding source for the heist was former SS officer Otto Skorzeny. As the story unfolds in the book, however, the German connection was proved to be false.
- Odd Man Out (1994) by Ronald Biggs, first published by Bloomsbury Publishing Limited (ISBN 0-7475-1683-9). This book is an autobiography of the life of Ronald Biggs, particularly his life on the run after the Great Train Robbery.
- Crossing The Line: Autobiography of a Thief (1995) by Bruce Reynolds, first published by Bantam Press (ISBN 1-8522-7929-X).
- Keep on Running (1996) by Ronald Biggs and Christopher Pickard, first published by Bloomsbury Publishing Limited (ISBN 0-7475-2188-3). This book is a novel that strongly draws on the events of the Great Train Robbery and suggests what may have happened to the three men who were never caught.
- Gangster's Moll – Living with a life of crime – from the Great Train Robbery to 'Mad' Frankie Fraser. (2001) by Marilyn Wisbey, first published by Little Brown and Company (ISBN 0-3168-5208-2). This is an autobiography of the daughter of Tommy Wisbey. It includes details concerning how his share was hidden and later spent, and the effect of the life of crime on the families of the criminals.
- Killing Charlie (2004) by Wensley Clarkson, first published by Mainstream Publishing Co (Edinburgh) Ltd (ISBN 9781845960353). This book serves as a biography for the train robber, Charlie Wilson but was written 14 years after his death.
- Ronnie Biggs - The Inside Story (2009) Hardback book by Mike Gray, a family friend of Biggs and organiser of the Free Ronnie Biggs Campaign 2001–2009. The book tells of Biggs's prison life in Belmarsh and Norwich prisons, from his UK return in May 2001 to his release from Norwich on compassionate grounds in August 2009. Published by Apex, ISBN 978-1-908548-48-1.
- Odd Man Out: The Last Straw (2011) by Ronald Biggs, first published by Mpress Limited (ISBN 978-0-9570398-2-7). This book is the final autobiography of the life of Ronald Biggs, particularly his life on the run after the Great Train Robbery. It includes Biggs's return to the UK and subsequent release. Biggs also contributed, along with Bruce Reynolds, to The Great Train Robbery 50th Anniversary: 1963–2013, published by Mpress in 2013. ISBN 0957255977.
- The Ronnie Biggs Quiz Book (October 2013) by Mike Gray, author of Ronnie Biggs - The Inside Story. 200 quiz questions on Ronald Arthur Biggs, published for e-readers by Apex, ISBN 978-1-909949-87-4.
- 101 Interesting Facts on Ronnie Biggs & The Great Train Robbery (November 2013) by Mike Gray, published by Apex, ISBN 978-1-909949-97-3.
- The Great Train Robbery Quiz Book (December 2013) by Mike Gray, published by Apex.

=== Retrospective accounts ===
- The Great British Train Robbery (2003) by Tim Coates, published by Tim Coates in 2003, (ISBN 1843810220). Contains National Archives extracts from the report of Her Majesty's Inspector of Constabulary, which was submitted to the Home Office in 1964.
- The Great Train Robbery (2008) by Peter Guttridge (ISBN 9781905615322). Commissioned by the National Archives as part of a series, this small book brings together highlights from the Public Records Office, Historical Manuscripts Commission, Office of Public Sector Information and Her Majesty's Stationery Office and information from other books.
- The Men Who Robbed The Great Train Robbers (2013) by Mick Lee, published by Matador (ISBN 9781783062485). A novel re-telling the robbery filling in the gaps in accounts told by the robbers and police.
- Signal Red (2010) by Robert Ryan, published by Headline Review (ISBN 9780755358182). A novel based on the robbery with a postscript by Bruce Reynolds.
- The Great Train Robbery – History Making Heist (2011) by Brenda Haugen, published by Compass Point Books, a Capstone Imprint (ISBN 9780756543600). A novel based on the robbery with a postscript by Bruce Reynolds.
- The Great Train Robbery – Crime of the Century – the definitive account (2013) by Stewart Richards and Nick Russell-Pavier, published by Weidenfeld & Nicolson/Orion Books (ISBN 9780297864394)
- The Great Train Robbery 50th Anniversary:1963–2013 (2013) by Bruce Reynolds, Ronnie Biggs, Nick Reynolds and Christopher Pickard, published by Mpress (ISBN 9780957255975). The full story of the planning preparation and aftermath from the people involved in the robbery.
- Pithie, Fraser; Cornwell, Christopher (August 2013). Pigott, Nick (ed.). "The Great Train Robbery". The Railway Magazine. Horncastle, Lincs: Mortons Media Group. pp. 49–53. ISSN 0033-8923. Archived from the original on 25 December 2013. Details of the story focussing on the railway aspects of the robbery.
- Keep on Running - A Story from the Great Train Robbery (1995/2014) by Ronnie Biggs and Christopher Pickard, published by Mpress (ISBN 9780992606275). A novel by Ronnie Biggs based on the three robbers that got away. The novel mixes fact with fiction. First published by Bloomsbury in 1995, it was published on Kindle for the first time on 8 August 2014 on what would have been Biggs' 85th birthday.

=== Film and video ===
- The 1966 German three-part TV mini series Die Gentlemen bitten zur Kasse tells a fictionalised version of the story more or less close to the facts, but changes the names of those involved and of locations.
- The 1967 film, Robbery, is a heavily fictionalised version based on the events of 1963 directed by Peter Yates. The movie launched Yates's Hollywood career after it attracted the interest of Steve McQueen who got the British director to make his next feature, Bullitt. The film featured a gripping car chase (though this was connected to another earlier crime and not the robbery) which included scenes of a policeman being run down. Despite being a fictionalised account Robbery did draw on key details of the real robbery and these were reflected in the film. These included the detailed planning and preparation used, the use of a farmhouse as a base and the intended (but unsuccessful) use of a replacement driver for the train. The film ends with the mastermind of the robbery "Clifton", played by Stanley Baker (whose own company Oakhurst Productions had produced the film), evading capture and going on the run overseas by posing as a merchant seaman.
- The 1969 French film The Brain stars David Niven as a British master criminal who perpetrates in France a heist based on the Great Train robbery. The script implies him to be the real planner of the 1963 robbery.
- Musician Phil Collins starred in the title role of Buster (1988), a comedy-drama film loosely based on the life of Edwards with Larry Lamb as Reynolds.
- In 2012, a five-part ITV docudrama, Mrs Biggs, was produced, relating events chiefly from the point of view of Charmian Biggs, who assisted in the scripting and production. ITV concurrently produced a 44-minute documentary film, The Great Train Robbery, written and directed by Marion Milne. Based on The Great Train Robbery – Crime of the Century – the definitive account (2013) by Nick Russell-Pavier, who also acted as programme consultant. Filmed at actual locations and featuring interviews with Charmian Biggs, Bruce Reynolds and other real-life participants.

== In popular culture ==
=== Literature ===
- John Gosling and Dennis Craig's book on the robbery The Great Train Robbery – the Incredible Story of a Masterpiece of Modern Crime (1965), theorised that the theft was masterminded by a cashiered British army officer, Johnnie Rainbow.
- The character of Rainbow featured in The Rainbow Affair (1967), a novel by David McDaniel based on the television series The Man from UNCLE.
- Signal Red: A Novel Based on the Great Train Robbery (2010), a novel by Robert Ryan.
- Keep on Running – A Story from the Great Train Robbery (1995/2014) by Ronnie Biggs and Christopher Pickard, published by Mpress (ISBN 9780992606275). A novel by Ronnie Biggs based on the three robbers that got away.
- Novelisation of Buster by Colin Shindler (ISBN 9780747403760).

=== Music ===
- Following the extradition attempt, Biggs collaborated with Bruce Henry (an American double-bass player), Jaime Shields, and Aureo de Souza to record Mailbag Blues, a musical narrative of his life that he intended to use a movie soundtrack. This album was re-released in 2004 by whatmusic.com.
- The British group Alabama 3 recorded a tribute to Bruce Reynolds about the robbery, "Have You Seen Bruce Richard Reynolds" (originally recorded by the Fylde Folk) on which he appears, on their 2005 album, Outlaw. Alabama 3 harmonica player, Nick Reynolds, is the son of Bruce Reynolds.)

=== Television ===
- In February 2006, Channel 4 aired a documentary about the 1981 plot to kidnap Biggs and take him to Barbados. The programme featured a dramatisation of the attempt and an interview with ex-soldier John Miller, one of the men responsible. In the programme, security consultant Patrick King, who led the team, claimed that the kidnapping may have in fact been a deniable operation.
- In 2012, ITV aired a documentary about the robbery based on a new book, The Great Train Robbery: The definitive account. The documentary was co-produced for ITV Studios by Stewart Richards, the 1980s arthouse film producer, who also co-wrote the book.
- On 18 December 2013, the day Ronnie Biggs died, BBC One aired the first of a two-part dramatisation The Great Train Robbery. Episode one, A Robber's Tale details the organisation of and successful completion of the robbery. Episode two, A Copper's Tale follows the police investigation into the crime and subsequent arrest of many of the perpetrators.

=== Theatre ===
- A popular skit from the comedy revue Beyond the Fringe, starring Peter Cook and Alan Bennett, deals with the efforts to catch the criminals behind the robbery.

== See also ==
- Beeching cuts
- Bezdany raid
- List of heists in the United Kingdom
- Train robbery
- Union Pacific Big Springs robbery
