= Ledburn =

Hamlet in Mentmore, Buckinghamshire, England

Coordinates: 51°53′N 0°41′W

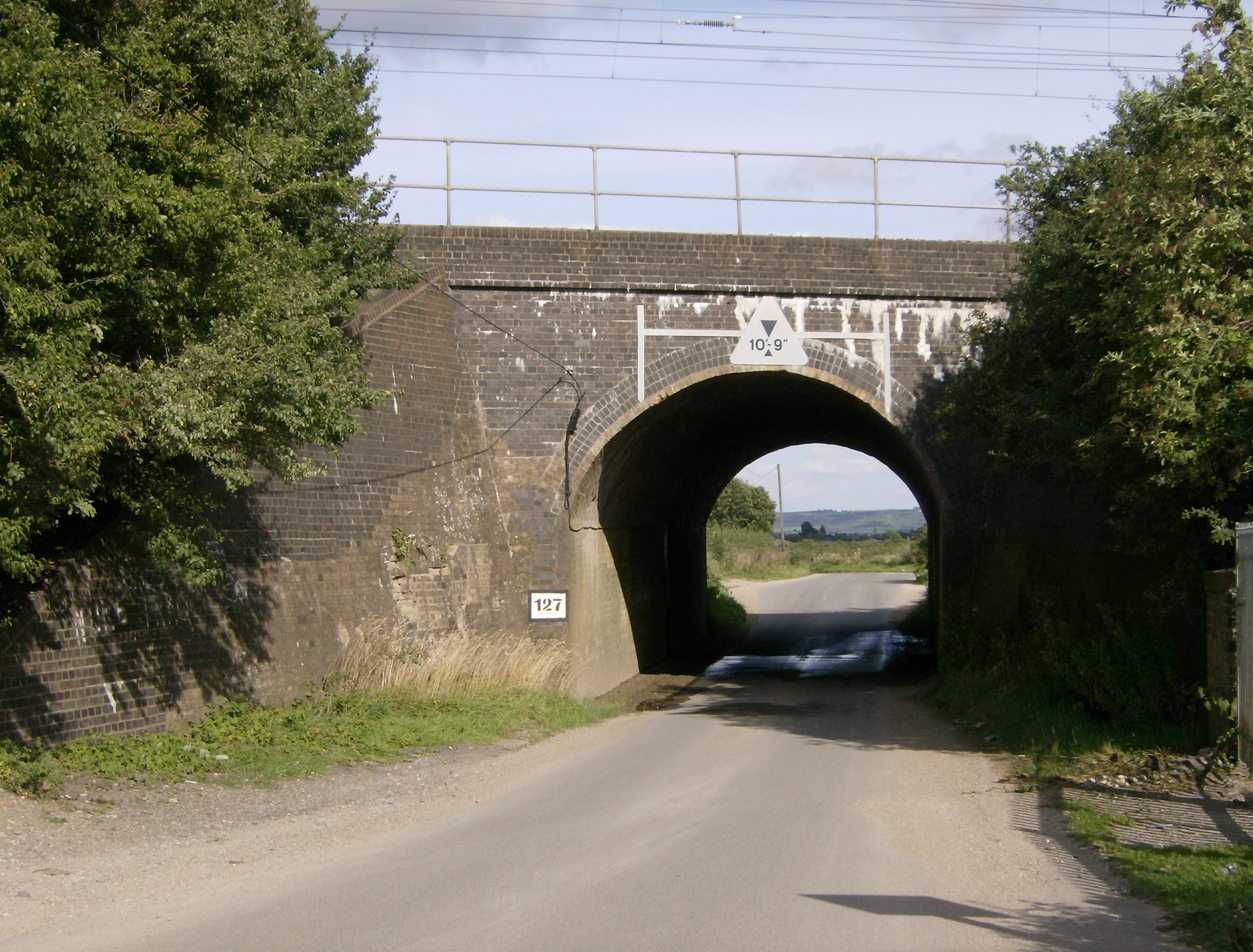
Mentmore Bridge (previously known as Bridego Bridge and then Train Robbers' bridge), at Ledburn, the scene of the Great Train Robbery in 1963.

Ledburn is a hamlet in the parish of Mentmore, in Buckinghamshire, England.

== History ==
The name Ledburn is Anglo Saxon in origin, and means "stream with a conduit". In manorial records of 1212 it was recorded as "Leteburn".

The hamlet consists of two roads with a mixture of Victorian cottages and modern houses, a public house (The Hare), which was converted to private dwellings in 2016, two 16th-century farm houses and a manor house. Ledburn Manor was built in the 16th century, and in the early 18th century it was given a new front facade in the classical style.

In the 19th and 20th centuries, the hamlet was owned by Baron Mayer de Rothschild and, by inheritance, became part of the Earl of Rosebery's Mentmore estate. The manor house at that time served as the estate office and home of the resident Land Agent. A tiny Methodist chapel in the hamlet has recently been converted to a private house.

The agricultural land in the village, having passed out of the Rothschild's ownership in the 20th century, is now back in the family's ownership, and is part of Sir Evelyn de Rothschild's Ascott Estate.

Ledburn was the scene of the so-called Great Train Robbery, in which a £2.6 million train robbery was committed at Bridego Railway Bridge (Bridge Number 127) on 8 August 1963.
