= Charlie Wilson (criminal) =

English career criminal (1932–1990)

- Born: Charles Frederick Wilson; June 30, 1932; Battersea, London, England
- Died: April 23, 1990 (aged 57); Marbella, Spain
- Cause of death: Gunshot
- Resting place: Streatham Cemetery
- Known for: Great Train Robbery
- Status: Convicted
- Penalty: 30 years' imprisonment

Charles Frederick Wilson (30 June 1932 – 23 April 1990) was an English career criminal. A member of the Great Train Robbery gang, of which he was treasurer. He was shot dead on the doorstep of his Marbella home in 1990.

== Early life ==
Wilson was born on 30 June 1932 to Bill and Mabel Wilson in Battersea, London. Of heavy build and handsome appearance, with piercing blue eyes, Wilson was, from an early age, an intimidating presence. He soon befriended many known or would-be criminals. His friends from childhood included Jimmy Hussey, Tommy Wisbey, Bruce Reynolds and Gordon Goody. Later on, he met Buster Edwards and two car thieves, Mickey Ball and Roy James.

From 1948 to 1950 he undertook National Service. In 1955 he married Patricia (Pat) Osbourne, with whom he had three children.

== Early career ==
Wilson turned to crime early in life and spurned his father's legitimate but low-income wage. While he did have legitimate work in his in-laws' grocer's shop, he also was a thief and his criminal proceeds went into buying shares in various gambling enterprises. He went to jail for short spells for numerous offences.

In 1960, Wilson began to work with Reynolds and planned to get into the criminal big league. In 1962, a gang led by Reynolds stole £62,000 in a security van robbery at London Heathrow Airport. They then robbed a Royal Mail train at Swindon, which netted £700. But Reynolds, looking for his career-criminal defining moment, started planning his next train robbery over a period of three months.

Reynolds organised a gang of 17 men to undertake the 1963 Great Train Robbery. Wilson was the gang's treasurer who gave the robbers their cut of the haul: £150,000 each. He was soon captured, and during the trial at Aylesbury Assizes in April 1964 he was given the nickname "the silent man" as he refused to say anything at all. Sentenced to 30 years imprisonment, he was held at HMP Winson Green, where after just four months on 12 August 1964, he arranged for a three-man gang to break in and facilitate his escape.

Wilson and his family settled in Rigaud, Quebec, Canada, situated 70 kilometres (43 mi) west of Montreal and 130 kilometres (81 mi) east of Ottawa. For Christmas 1964, the family travelled to Acapulco to join Reynolds and Edwards, who had not been caught. Reynolds and his family later moved to Montreal, but a proposed theft of Canadian dollars with Wilson was prevented by Royal Canadian Mounted Police observation. Reynolds moved to Vancouver, before returning that summer to the South of France.

== Re-capture ==
Having successfully evaded re-capture for four years, Wilson was caught on 24 January 1968, after his wife telephoned her parents in England, thus enabling Scotland Yard to track them down. Returning to England, Wilson served 10 more years in the train robbers secure unit at HMP Durham.

== Later career ==
A suspect in a £100 million gold fraud, Wilson moved to Marbella, Spain, where he was suspected of involvement in drug smuggling. Engaged to launder some of the proceeds from the Brink's-Mat robbery, he lost the investors £3 million.

== Death ==
On 23 April 1990, Wilson's cousin and his wife, who were staying with the Wilsons in a hacienda north of Marbella, left the house, noticing a young man with badly dyed spiky blond hair sunning himself beside his yellow bicycle on a nearby roundabout. The same man knocked on the front door of Wilson's house, and when Pat Wilson opened the door, he asked (in a London accent) to speak to Wilson, as he had a message from Eamon Evans. A baseball cap pulled down shielded his eyes from view. Pat got him to leave the bike near the front door, and let him go out to the back garden to talk to Wilson, who was preparing a barbecue dinner to celebrate his and Pat's wedding anniversary.

After five minutes of conversation, the visitor kicked Wilson in the groin, broke his nose, and shot him twice, once in the neck and once in the head. One of Wilson's two guard dogs sustained a broken leg trying to defend him and was later put down. The killer then jumped over the back fence in the one spot where it was possible to do so and land safely outside, and circled back to the front of the house to retrieve the bicycle. An accomplice pulled up in a van nearby, the killer put the bike in the back, and together they escaped. The whole hit was expertly designed to kill Wilson alone and leave his wife alive.

Wilson's wife moved back to London to live near her daughters. Wilson was buried in Streatham Cemetery in London.

It is likely that Wilson was murdered on the orders of Roy Francis Adkins, with killers identified by Pat Wilson as Bill "Skins" Edmunds, with Danny "Scarface" Roff as the accomplice. The two men were known to work as a team. Adkins was angry with Wilson because he had supposedly given permission for smuggler Jimmy Rose to admit to police that a drug shipment he was carrying was owned by Adkins, who was already a wanted man. After a request from Rose, Wilson rang one of Adkins' associates, Eamon Evans, to ask whether Rose could name him. While Rose denied naming Adkins, two days after Wilson's call to Evans, police raided Adkins hideout in Amsterdam shortly after he had left it. Adkins, a heavy drug user as well as dealer, was furious with Wilson, and would not agree to peaceful terms arranged by intermediaries. Whether or not the three men were guilty, they were widely held responsible, and Adkins was himself shot dead on 28 September 1990. On 10 February 1996, Danny 'Scarface' Roff, who had recently been released from prison, was wounded in the spine when a gunman walked into a club he was visiting and shot him multiple times. In March 1997, Roff was shot dead in his car as he returned home. Edmunds survived by going on the run.
