= Jack Slipper =

British police officer

- Born: Jack Kenneth Slipper; 20 April 1924; London, England
- Died: 24 August 2005 (aged 81); Pershore, England
- Occupation: Detective Chief Superintendent
- Employer: Metropolitan Police
- Known for: his role in investigating the Great Train Robbery of 1963, and in tracking down Ronnie Biggs after he escaped from prison in 1965

Jack Kenneth Slipper (20 April 1924 – 24 August 2005) was a Detective Chief Superintendent in the Metropolitan Police in London. He was known as "Slipper of the Yard" (referring to Scotland Yard). He was mainly known for his role in investigating the Great Train Robbery of 1963, and in tracking down Ronnie Biggs after he escaped from prison in 1965, although he had to leave Brazil without Biggs.

== Early life ==
Slipper was born in Ealing, west London, and educated at Little Ealing School. He left school aged 14 and worked as an electrician's apprentice until 1941, when he enlisted in the Royal Air Force to serve in the Second World War. He served as an electrician with a nightfighter squadron at West Malling, and was then posted to the Rhodesian Air Training Group in Salisbury, Rhodesia (now Harare, Zimbabwe) in 1943. Having grown to 6'3", he became light heavyweight boxing champion of the Rhodesian combined services. He was demobilized in 1946 and returned to work in London as an electrician.

== Early police career ==
Slipper joined the Metropolitan Police in 1951. He trained at Hendon Police College, and served briefly as a police constable in Brentford before moving to Chelsea. He undertook traffic duties, and guarded the residence of the US Ambassador in South Kensington.

He joined the Criminal Investigation Department (CID) in 1956. After an unusually short probationary period of little more than 2 years (rather than the usual 3 or 4), he was posted to Acton as a Detective Constable. He joined the Flying Squad in 1962, and was quickly promoted to Detective Sergeant, becoming a Detective Inspector by 1968. He left the Flying Squad to be posted to Harlesden. In 1971, he became a Detective Chief Inspector in Q Division (formed in 1965 to cover the Wembley area, previously divided between S and T Divisions) and moved to Harrow, then Detective Chief Superintendent of the stolen-car squad at Chalk Farm. He was in charge of operations at the Flying Squad from 1973 to 1977 as its deputy head under Commander Don Neesham, and then head of Q Division detectives at Wembley.

He was involved in the investigation of the Shepherd's Bush murders in which three unarmed policemen were shot dead in Shepherd's Bush in August 1966, for which three men were later convicted.

== Great Train Robbery ==
Slipper is mainly notable for his role in investigating the Great Train Robbery in August 1963. Then a Detective Sergeant with the Flying Squad, Slipper was one of six police officers chosen by its head, Tommy Butler, to form a special unit to catch the robbers. According to the police investigation, several of the robbers had left fingerprints or palm prints at the gang's temporary hideout at Leatherslade Farm in Buckinghamshire. Biggs' fingerprints were found on a bottle of tomato sauce. Slipper was present when Biggs was arrested at his home in Redhill on 4 September 1963.

After being sentenced to 30 years imprisonment in 1964, Biggs escaped from Wandsworth Prison in 1965. Biggs travelled via Paris to Spain and then Melbourne, Australia, where, despite plastic surgery to alter his appearance, he was identified by his dental records after visiting a dentist.

In January 1968 after six years with the Flying Squad, and most of the wanted Train Robbers caught, Slipper decided to return to Division and gained promotion to Detective Chief Inspector in September of that year. After a few other postings, in March 1973 he returned to the Flying Squad as operational Chief Superintendent.

=== 1974 extradition attempt ===
Despite rumours, Biggs remained untraced until 1974, when he gave an interview to the Daily Express. The newspaper passed his location on to the police, and Biggs was captured on 1 February. Slipper travelled to Brazil, where he attempted to arrest Biggs in a hotel in Rio de Janeiro, with the words "Long time no see, Ronnie." But the Brazilian government turned down the request for extradition, on the grounds that Biggs was to become the father of his pregnant Brazilian girlfriend's child (Michael Biggs, to be born 16 August 1974), and Slipper was forced to return home empty-handed. Famously, Slipper was photographed on the plane home, sleeping next to an empty seat, and was christened "Slip-up of the Yard" by the press.

=== 1981 Scots Guardsmen kidnapping ===
Biggs was abducted by former Scots Guardsmen in 1981 and taken to Barbados. An extradition request was made, but it was denied due to the lack of a treaty between the United Kingdom and Barbados; he was returned to Brazil.

=== Biggs' return to U.K. ===
Biggs finally returned voluntarily to the UK in May 2001. He was accompanied by Bruce Reynolds on a private plane. Slipper believed that Biggs should not be released, and regularly appeared in the media to comment on any news item connected to the robbery.

== Later police career ==
He was involved in several major investigations such as the Bank of America robbery in April 1975, in which £8 million was stolen from a branch in Davies Street, Mayfair. He was also involved with Britain's first "Supergrass" trial in 1973, in which bank robber Bertie Smalls testified against his former associates in exchange for his own freedom, and then in the trials supported by the evidence of "King Squealer" Maurice O'Mahoney.

Slipper helped to set up the Robbery Squad, which later merged into the Flying Squad.

After the Metropolitan Police Commissioner, Sir Robert Mark, initiated an "interchange" policy, which required CID officers to return to uniformed work, Slipper ended his career as a uniformed chief superintendent as head of X Division in Ruislip.

== Later life ==
Slipper retired in 1979 after 28 years service, and became a security consultant. He worked in security for IBM UK in the 1980s and 1990s from offices in Greenford, West London. He also enjoyed playing golf at Sudbury.

After his retirement, Slipper returned to Rio and met Ronnie Biggs once again, later remarking that "[Biggs'] villa was bog-standard and in the wrong end of town. His swimming pool was so black with algae even a stickleback couldn't live in it. He was flogging T-shirts to tourists to make a living."

He published an autobiography, Slipper of the Yard, in 1981. He sued the BBC for libel after a television film, The Great Paper Chase, portrayed Slipper (played by Jeremy Kemp) and his colleagues as incompetent. The legal action was financed by Sir James Goldsmith, Slipper won damages of £50,000, his costs (estimated at £400,000), and an apology.

Slipper was awarded the Lord Willis Award in 2004 for his CID work.

He was diagnosed with cancer in 1999 and died 6 years later, aged 81. He was survived by his wife, Anne, and two daughters.
