= Buster Edwards =

British criminal (1931–1994)

- Born: Ronald Christopher Edwards; 27 January 1931; Lambeth, London, England
- Died: 28 November 1994 (aged 63); Lambeth, London, England
- Other name: Buster
- Occupations: Barman; florist
- Spouse: June Rose Rothery (1952–1994; his death)
- Children: 1
- Status: Released in 1975 after serving nine years
- Motive: Financial
- Conviction: Great Train Robbery
- Penalty: 15 years

Ronald Christopher "Buster" Edwards (27 January 1931 – 28 November 1994) was a British criminal who was a member of the gang that committed the 1963 Great Train Robbery. He had also been a boxer, and owned a nightclub and a flower shop.

== Early life ==
Ronald Christopher Edwards was born on 27 January 1931 in Lambeth, the son of a barman. After leaving school, he worked in a sausage factory, where he began his criminal career by stealing meat to sell on the post-war black market. During his national service in the RAF, he was detained for stealing cigarettes. When he returned to south London, he ran a drinking club and became a professional criminal.

He was involved in the theft of £62,000 (£1.16 million today) from Comet House, the headquarters of British Overseas Airways Corporation at Heathrow Airport, in 1962. Many of the gang were captured, but Edwards escaped arrest. Many from the same gang were involved in the Great Train Robbery in August 1963.

== Great Train Robbery ==
The Great Train gang intercepted the Glasgow-London mail train in Buckinghamshire in the early hours of 8 August 1963. After tampering with the track-side signal lights, they stopped the train at Sears Crossing and moved the engine and high-value carriage to Bridego Bridge, near Cheddington, escaping with £2,600,000 of used banknotes (the equivalent of £47.5 million today). The driver, Jack Mills, was beaten over the head and suffered from related complications for the rest of his life: opinion is divided as to whether the injury was a factor in his death. The gang's temporary hideout at Leatherslade Farm was quickly found. Most of the gang were captured, tried and imprisoned, but Edwards evaded arrest with his £150,000 share of the stolen money.

Edwards and another gang member, Bruce Reynolds, took their families to Mexico. The money ran out, and Edwards' family became homesick, so he negotiated his return to England in 1966. He was arrested and sentenced to 15 years in jail.

== Later life ==
Edwards spent nine years in prison. After his early release in 1975, he ran a flower stall outside Waterloo station in London. He gave interviews to writer Piers Paul Read, persuading him to write in his 1978 book The Train Robbers that the robbery was led by German commando Otto Skorzeny, and that Edwards was the person responsible for hitting Jack Mills. Edwards later retracted these claims.

Buster, a film about his role in the Great Train Robbery, was made in 1988, with Edwards played by Phil Collins. Buster Edwards can be seen making a cameo appearance in the film Buster alongside Collins' wife Jill in the scene in which Buster and June land in Mexico, he and Jill walk out of the airport in front of Buster and June Edwards.

== Personal life ==
Edwards married June Rothery in 1952. They had a daughter, Nicolette.

== Death ==
Edwards died in Lambeth, London, at the age of 63. His body was found by his brother, Terence, hanging from a steel girder inside a lock-up garage in Leake Street, Lambeth. At the Inquest following Edwards's death, a panel recorded an open verdict, based on testimony that the deceased was too intoxicated to form an intent to kill himself. At the time of his death, he was being investigated by the police as part of an inquiry into a suspected large-scale fraud and it is speculated that fear of being re-imprisoned could have led to a suicide attempt.
