= Alabama 3 discography =

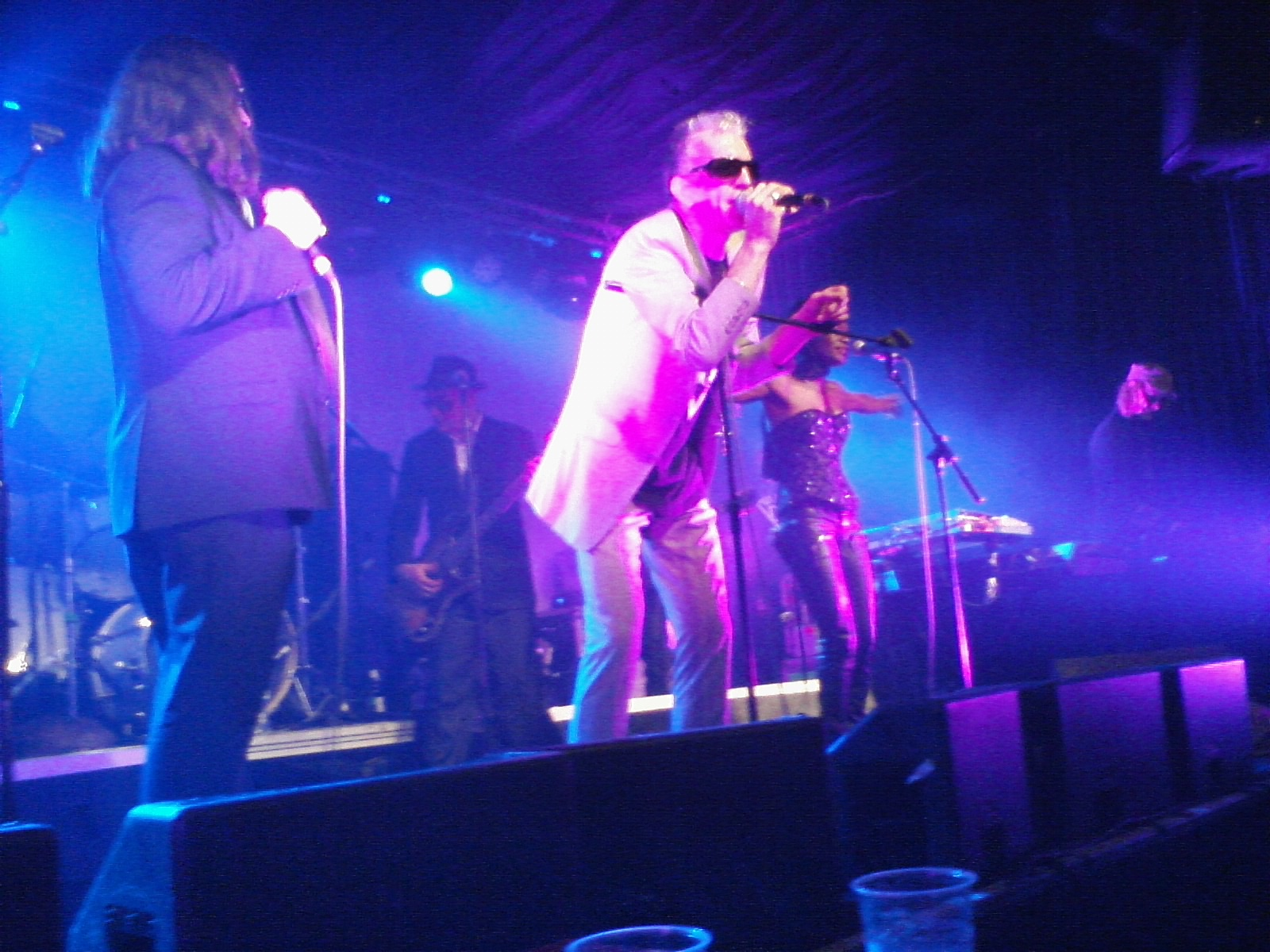
- Alabama 3 performing in Brighton 2011
- Studio albums: 13
- Soundtrack albums: 1
- Compilation albums: 1
- Singles: 14
- Music videos: 6

This is the discography of the British electronica/rock band, Alabama 3. The band was founded by The Very Reverend Dr. D.Wayne Love (Jake Black) and Larry Love (Rob Spragg), and consists of twelve studio albums, fourteen singles and two solo efforts from band members. Alabama 3 are best known for "Woke Up This Morning" which was chosen as the opening theme to the HBO hit TV series, The Sopranos. They have also covered songs by Bruce Springsteen, The Eagles and John Prine.

== Albums ==
=== Studio albums ===
Title	Album details	Peak chart positions			
Title	Album details	UK	UK Indie	IRE	SCO
Exile on Coldharbour Lane	Released: 11 November 1997; Label: Elemental (#ELM40); Formats: LP, CD	153	12	—	—
La Peste	Released: 24 October 2000; Label: Elemental (#ELM53); Formats: LP, CD	80	9	—	72
Power in the Blood	Released: 28 October 2002; Label: One Little Indian (#TPLP374); Formats: LP, CD	88	14	—	70
Last Train to Mashville, Volume 2	Released: 28 October 2002; Label: One Little Indian (#TPLP386); Formats: LP, CD	—	—	—	—
Outlaw	Released: 23 May 2005; Label: One Little Indian (#TPLP389); Formats: LP, CD	83	—	—	—
M.O.R.	Released: 9 September 2007; Label: One Little Indian (#TPLP773); Formats: LP, CD	88	7	45	63
Revolver Soul	Released: 3 May 2010; Label: Hostage Music (#HOSTRECCD01); Formats: CD	66	4	—	52
There Will Be Peace in the Valley... When We Get the Keys to the Mansion on the Hill	Released: 24 February 2011; Label: Hostage Music (#HOSTRECCD02); Formats: CD	—	—	—	—
Shoplifting 4 Jesus	Released: 7 November 2011; Label: Hostage Music (#HOSTRECCD03); Formats: CD	—	—	—	—
The Men from W.O.M.B.L.E.	Released: 29 November 2013; Label: Hostage Music (#HOSTRCCD04); Formats: CD	—	—	—	—
The Wimmin from W.O.M.B.L.E.	Released: 6 November 2014; Label: Hostage Music (#HOSTRCCD05); Formats: CD	—	—	—	—
Blues	Released: 28 October 2016; Label: Hostage Music (#HOSTRCCD06); Formats: CD	—	21	—	47
Step 13	Released: 24 September 2021; Label: Submarine Cat; Formats: CD, cassette, LP	100	8	—	—
Cold War Classics Vol. 2	Released: 3 November 2023; Label: Submarine Cat; Formats: CD, LP	—	—	—	—
"—" denotes items that did not chart or were not released in that territory.

=== Compilation albums ===
Title	Album details	Peak chart positions				
Title	Album details	UK	UK Indie	IRE	NZ	SCO
Hits and Exit Wounds	Released: 21 April 2008; Label: One Little Indian (#TPLP928); Formats: LP, CD	155	10	96	34	94

=== Soundtrack albums ===
Title	Album details	Song
A Life Less Ordinary Soundtrack	Released: 14 October 1997; Label: London Records; Formats: CD, Cassette	"Peace in the Valley"
The Sopranos: Soundtrack	Released: 13 December 1999; Label: Sony (#497403); Formats: CD	"Woke Up This Morning"

== Singles ==
Year	Title	Peak chart positions				Album
Year	Title	UK	UK Indie	IRE	SCO	Album
1996	"Ain't Goin' to Goa"	90	—	—	96	Exile on Coldharbour Lane
1997	"Woke Up This Morning"	78	—	—	79	Exile on Coldharbour Lane
1997	"Speed of the Sound of Loneliness"	72	8	—	61	Exile on Coldharbour Lane
1998	"Ain't Goin' to Goa" (re-issue)	40	6	—	36	Exile on Coldharbour Lane
1998	"Converted"	100	31	—	—	Exile on Coldharbour Lane
2000	"Woke Up This Morning" (re-issue)	79	—	41	60	Exile on Coldharbour Lane
2001	"Mansion on the Hill"	151	30	—	—	La Peste
2001	"Wade into the Water"	—	—	—	—	La Peste
2003	"Reachin'"	176	—	—	—	Power in the Blood
2005	"Hello... I'm Johnny Cash"	78	—	—	—	Outlaw
2005	"How Can I Protect You?" (featuring Aslan)	—	—	—	—	Outlaw
2005	"Gospel Train"	—	—	—	—	Outlaw
2007	"Lockdown"	—	—	—	—	M.O.R.
2008	"Middle of the Road"	—	—	—	—	M.O.R.
2010	"Jaqueline"	—	—	—	—	Revolver Soul
2010	"Vietnamistan"	—	—	—	—	Revolver Soul
2025	"Sex Machine Learning"	—	—	—	—	
"—" denotes items that did not chart or were not released in that territory.

== Solo albums ==
Artist	Album	Year	Notes
O'Connell & Love	Minesweeping	2015	Performed by Larry Love and Brendan O'Connell
Robert Love	Ghost Flight	2006	
The Spirit of Love	Middle Class Riot	2019	Sold only on tour and through the A3 Website

== Other releases ==
- Converted Pt.1 (1998) (Import)
- Woke up this Morning (2000) (Import)
- Sad Eyed Lady/A3 Remixes (2001)
- Mansion on the Hill (2001) (Import)
- Ya Basta! - Live in Italy (2001) (bootleg)
- Zero Tolerance (2001) (bootleg)
- Transfusion: Power in the Blood Remixes (2002) (tour only)
- Live in Dublin (2002) (tour only)
- Last Train to Mashville, vol.1 (2004) (tour only)
- Live at Glastonbury 2005 (2006) (tour only)
- Outlaw Remixes (2006) (tour only)
- 12 Step Plan - Unofficial Release (2010)

== Music videos ==
Title	Year	Album	Notes
"Ain't Goin' to Goa"	1998	Exile on Coldharbour Lane	
"Woke Up This Morning"	1999	La Peste	Chosen One Remix
"Too Sick to Pray"	2001	La Peste	
"Woke Up This Morning"	2001	—N/a	"Sopranos Edit"
"Hello... I'm Johnny Cash"	2006	Outlaw	
"Vietnamistan"	2010	Revolver Soul	
