= Hits and Exit Wounds =

Compilation album by Alabama 3
- Released: 2008
- Genre: Acid house; alternative
- Label: One Little Indian

Alabama 3 chronology
M.O.R. (2007)	Hits and Exit Wounds (2008)	Revolver Soul (2010)

Hits and Exit Wounds is a retrospective album by Alabama 3, featuring several different versions of well-known tracks taken from all of their albums, and two previously unreleased tracks.

== Track listing ==
1. "Hypo Full of Love (The 12 Step Plan)" (taken from Exile on Coldharbour Lane) – 5:34
2. "Woke Up This Morning" (Sopranos mix) featuring Street Angels Choir NYC and The Man with the Itch, Mr. Shifta (taken from La Peste) – 4:03
3. "Hello... I'm Johnny Cash" (taken from Outlaw) – 3:47
4. "Mao Tse Tung Said" (taken from Exile on Coldharbour Lane) - 4:54
5. "Mansion on the Hill" (Arthur Baker remix) (taken from "Mansion on the Hill" single) – 5:45
6. "U Don't Danse to Tekno Anymore" (taken from The Last Train to Mashville Vol. 2) – 3:41
7. "How Can I Protect You" Featuring Aslan (taken from Outlaw) – 5:13
8. "Woody Guthrie" (taken from Power in the Blood) – 4:15
9. "Ain't Goin' to Goa" (taken from Exile on Coldharbour Lane) – 3:48
10. "Monday Don't Mean Anything" (taken from M.O.R.) – 4:00
11. "Sad Eyed Lady of the Low Life" (taken from La Peste) – 4:16
12. "Amos Moses" (taken from M.O.R.) – 4:50
13. "Too Sick to Pray" (taken from La Peste) – 4:26
14. "Up Above My Head" (taken from Outlaw) – 3:57
15. "R.E.H.A.B." (taken from Power in the Blood) – 3:45
16. "Speed of the Sound of Loneliness" (taken from Exile on Coldharbour Lane) – 4:31
17. "Ska'd for Life" (Orbital mix) – 4:10
18. "Peace in the Valley" (taken from The Last Train to Mashville Vol. 2) – 3:53

== Charts ==
Chart performance for Hits and Exit Wounds
Chart (2008)	Peak position
Irish Albums (IRMA)	96
New Zealand Albums (RMNZ)	34
Scottish Albums (OCC)	94
UK Independent Albums (OCC)	10
