= Exile on Coldharbour Lane =

Studio album by Alabama 3
- Released: 11 November 1997
- Recorded: March 1997 – June 1997
- Studios: Dairy, Brixton, London, England; Steamrooms, London, England
- Genres: Blues; acid house; country; trip hop
- Length: 60:47
- Labels: One Little Indian, Geffen
- Producer: Matthew Vaughan

Alabama 3 chronology
Exile on Coldharbour Lane (1997)	La Peste (2000)

Singles from Exile on Coldharbour Lane
- 1. "Ain't Goin' to Goa" Released: 1996; 2. "Woke Up This Morning" Released: June 1997; 3. "Speed of the Sound of Loneliness" Released: 1997; 4. "Ain't Goin' to Goa (re-issue)" Released: 1998; 5. "Converted" Released: 1998; 6. "Woke Up This Morning (re-issue)" Released: 2000

Exile on Coldharbour Lane is the debut album by Alabama 3, released on 11 November 1997 on One Little Indian and Geffen. The name and cover are references to Exile on Main St. by The Rolling Stones and Coldharbour Lane, a major street in Brixton, South London which contains several after-hours clubs and has seen frequent drug dealing.

Recording sessions took place from March to June 1997. The song "Sister Rosetta" was featured in the film Barnyard. The "Chosen One Mix" of "Woke Up This Morning" was used as the opening theme music for the television series The Sopranos. "Woke Up This Morning" was later sampled by Nas on "Got Ur Self A..." from the album Stillmatic.

== Reception ==
Professional ratings
Review scores
Source	Rating
AllMusic	4/5 stars
NME	3/10 stars
Pitchfork	8.9/10
Uncut	4/5 stars

Upon its release, Exile on Coldharbour Lane received favorable reviews, including an 8.9 review from Pitchfork Media. A review in Cherwell said there were "many highlights on this bizarre journey of an album", praising 'Ain't Going To Goa' and 'Mao Tse Tung Said' but describing 'Purple Tin' as "awful [...] pure bar room schmaltz".

In a 2008 article in The Guardian, Irvine Welsh said the techno and country and western fusion was "astonishingly bold" and called it an "incendiary debut album".

== Track listing ==
Exile on Coldharbour Lane track listing
No.	Title	Writer(s)	Length
1.	"Converted"	Jake Black, Simon Edwards, Orlando Harrison, Rob Spragg, Brian O'Horain	6:15
2.	"Speed of the Sound of Loneliness"	John Prine	5:57
3.	"Woke Up This Morning"	Black, Edwards, Spragg, Piers Marsh, Chester Burnett	5:16
4.	"U Don't Dans 2 Tekno Anymore"	Black, Edwards, Spragg, Marsh, Harrison, O'Horain	3:37
5.	"Bourgeoisie Blues"	Edwards, Spragg, Marsh	4:47
6.	"Ain't Goin' to Goa"	Black, Edwards, Spragg, Marsh	3:55
7.	"Mao Tse Tung Said"	Black, Edwards, Spragg, Marsh, John Delafons	3:23
8.	"Hypo Full of Love (The 12-Step Plan)"	Black,	6:25
9.	"The Old Purple Tin (9% of Pure Heaven)"	Black, Robert "Hacker" Jessett	4:05
10.	"The Night We Nearly Got Busted"	Edwards, Spragg, Marsh, Harrison	4:37
11.	"Sister Rosetta"	Edwards, Spragg, Marsh, Harrison, Robert Bailey	6:43
12.	"Peace in the Valley"	Marsh, Spragg, Errol Thompson, Gian Mario Tonin	5:47
Total length:			60:47

== Personnel ==
Alabama 3

- Larry Love (Rob Spragg) – vocals
- The Very Reverend Dr. D. Wayne Love (First Minister of the First Presleyterian Church of Elvis the Divine (UK)) (Jake Black) – vocals
- The Mountain of Love (Piers Marsh) – analogue terrorism, harmonica, jaw's harp & vocals
- Sir Real "Congaman" Love L.S.D. O.P.T. (Simon Edwards) – percussion, acoustic guitar
- Mississippi Guitar Love – guitar
- L.B. Dope (Johnny Delafons) – drums
- The Spirit (Orlando Harrison) – keyboards
- The Book of Love (Security), I.V. Lenin (Socialism in the Mainline), Lady Love and Little Eye Tie – D. Wayne's Ladies

Technical

- Produced by The Ministers at Work and Boss Hogg
- Engineered by John Wilkinson at The Steamroom and The Dairy
- Mixed by Andy Wallace at The Town House
  - Track 3 contains an element of "Tell Me" performed by Howlin Wolf, a sample from "Standing at the Burying Ground" by Mississippi Fred McDowell and a sample from "Mannish Boy" by Muddy Waters.
  - Track 8 contains elements from "Honey Hush" performed by Johnny Burnett & The Rock 'n' Roll Trio.
  - Track 11 contains samples from "Oh in That Morning" by The Reverend BC Campbell and "Wrapped Up and Tangled Up" by The Reverend Charlie Jackson.

== Notes ==
- "Woke Up This Morning" is well known as the opening theme music for the HBO drama series The Sopranos, although the mix used for the show is different from the one on this album. This version is called Chosen One Mix.
- "Mao Tse Tung Said" features a lengthy sample from the cult leader Jim Jones.
- The second track is a cover version of John Prine's "Speed of the Sound of Loneliness".
- "The Old Purple Tin (9% of Pure Heaven)" is about Tennent's Super, a 9% a.b.v. Scottish beer that comes in a purple can, which makes its consumers appear purple when aged and weathered, and thus deserves its reputation for being the drink of choice of the vagrant.
- "Ain't Goin' to Goa" features the Reverend D. Wayne Love's description of A3's style: "sweet, pretty, country acid house music."

== Charts ==
Chart performance for Exile on Coldharbour Lane
Chart (1997)	Peak position
UK Independent Albums (Official Charts)	12

== See also ==
- 24 Hour Church of Elvis
