= Power in the Blood =

Power in the Blood may refer to:

- "Power in the Blood", The Salvation Army song by Lewis E. Jones, 1899
- Power in the Blood (Alabama 3 album), 2002
- Power in the Blood (Buffy Sainte-Marie album), 2015
