= The Lost Tapes 2 =

Compilation album by Nas
- Released: July 19, 2019
- Recorded: 2006–2017
- Genre: Hip hop
- Length: 59:37
- Labels: Mass Appeal; Def Jam
- Producers: The Alchemist; AraabMuzik; DJ Dahi; DJ Khalil; DJ Toomp; Eric Hudson; Hit-Boy; Kanye West; No I.D.; Pete Rock; Pharrell Williams; RZA; Statik Selektah; Swizz Beatz; Xharlie Black; Nasir Jones

Nas chronology
Nasir (2018)	The Lost Tapes 2 (2019)	King's Disease (2020)

Singles from The Lost Tapes 2
- 1. "Jarreau of Rap (Skatt Attack)" Released: July 12, 2019

The Lost Tapes 2 is a compilation album by American rapper Nas, released on July 19, 2019 by Mass Appeal Records and Def Jam Recordings. It is the sequel to the compilation album The Lost Tapes, released in 2002. The Lost Tapes 2 features unreleased tracks from Nas’ last four studio albums: Hip Hop Is Dead (2006), Untitled (2008), Life Is Good (2012) and the album scrapped in favor of Nasir (2018). It includes production from producers such as RZA, Swizz Beatz, Pharrell Williams, Kanye West, No I.D., Pete Rock and The Alchemist, among others.

== Background ==
In 2002, Nas released The Lost Tapes, compiling previously unreleased tracks that were discarded from recording sessions for Nas' studio albums, I Am... (1999) and Stillmatic (2001). A follow-up compilation, The Lost Tapes 2, was originally intended to be released on December 16, 2003, and include unreleased recordings, remixes, and freestyle tracks. However, its release was delayed, and in 2006, Nas signed to Def Jam Recordings. In a June 2010 interview for Hot 97.5 KVEG, he talked about a follow-up to The Lost Tapes, "I do got a lot of songs that really didn't make no album, that's just sittin' around [or] got lost. So I've got enough actually, for a Lost Tapes 2 and 3 by now. So I've just got to set it up, put them together – 12 songs for one album, 12 songs for another album, and figure it out. That's all it takes." In September, he announced plans to release The Lost Tapes 2 on December 14. However, its release was further delayed by Def Jam, whom Nas accused of mishandling the project and its budget in a personal e-mail sent to label executives. Reports of the project's delay incited fans to create an online petition in December asking for Def Jam to release the album. After losing time to the project's delay, Nas began recording for a new studio album and put plans for The Lost Tapes 2 on hold.

In 2012, American singer Frank Ocean and producer Hit-Boy created a track entitled "No Such Thing As White Jesus" that went unreleased. The track was reworked as "Royalty" featuring RaVaughn. Ocean still received songwriting credit for the track.

== Promotion ==
On June 11, 2019, Nas shared a promotional video via his Instagram account, announcing the release of The Lost Tapes 2 in the near future. On July 2, a trailer was released to announce the album's cover art and production credits, alongside its track listing and a release date of July 19, 2019. The trailer included a preview of the album track "Lost Freestyle".

== Critical reception ==
Professional ratings
Aggregate scores
Source	Rating
Metacritic	58/100
Review scores
Source	Rating
AllMusic	2.5/5 stars
HipHopDX	3.1/5
The Independent	4/5 stars
NME	2/5 stars
Pitchfork	5.1/10
Rolling Stone	3/5 stars

At Metacritic, which assigns a normalized rating out of 100 from mainstream publications, the album received an average score of 58, based on 7 reviews.

Roisin O'Connor of The Independent concluded that The Lost Tapes 2 "sounds like an artist rediscovering his love for hip hop in the most joyous and satisfying way", naming the songs produced by Kanye West, Swizz Beatz and RZA as the standout tracks. Rolling Stone's Christopher R. Weingarten praised Nas' performance, calling him "a rap legend at his most stylistically diverse", however, he described the album as "a messy display of the many sides of Nas" at both "his most essential and least essential".

== Commercial performance ==
The Lost Tapes 2 debuted at number 10 on the Billboard 200 with 23,000 album-equivalent units, of which 12,000 were pure album sales. It is Nas's 13th US top 10 album.

== Track listing ==
No.	Title	Writer(s)	Producer(s)	Length
1.	"No Bad Energy"	Nasir Jones; Kaseem Dean; Abraham Orellana	Swizz Beatz; AraabMuzik	3:02
2.	"Vernon Family"	Jones; Pharrell Williams; Jamal Sublett	Williams	3:00
3.	"Jarreau of Rap (Skatt Attack)" (featuring Al Jarreau and Keyon Harrold)	Jones; Keyon Harrold; Eddie Cole; Dave Brubeck; Al Jarreau	Xharlie Black; Nas^{[a]}	3:18
4.	"Lost Freestyle"	Jones; Patrick Baril; Angela Bofill	Statik Selektah	3:24
5.	"Tanasia"	Jones; Robert Diggs; Michael Dunford; Betty Newsinger	RZA	3:50
6.	"Royalty" (featuring RaVaughn)	Jones; Chauncey Hollis; Christopher Breaux	Hit-Boy	4:50
7.	"Who Are You" (featuring David Ranier)	Jones; Eric Hudson; David Ranier Webber	Eric Hudson	3:44
8.	"Adult Film" (featuring Swizz Beatz)	Jones; Dean	Swizz Beatz	4:10
9.	"War Against Love"	Jones; Dacoury Dahi Natche; Khalil Abdul-Rahman	DJ Khalil; DJ Dahi	3:47
10.	"The Art of It" (featuring J. Myers)	Jones; Peter Phillips; Sublett; Vincent Brown; Anthony Criss; Keir Gist	Pete Rock	4:08
11.	"Highly Favored"	Jones; Diggs; Homer Banks; Carl Hampton; Raymond Jackson	RZA	2:23
12.	"Queens Wolf"	Jones; Aldrin Davis	DJ Toomp	3:46
13.	"It Never Ends"	Jones; Daniel Maman; Colin Gibson; Kenny Craddock	The Alchemist	3:32
14.	"You Mean the World to Me"	Jones; Kanye West; Leroy Hutson	Kanye West	3:00
15.	"QueensBridge Politics"	Jones; Phillips	Pete Rock	3:02
16.	"Beautiful Life" (featuring RaVaughn)	Jones; Ernest Wilson; Reginald Brown; Richard Davis; Stafford Floyd	No I.D.	6:41
Total length:				59:37

Notes

- ^{^[a]} signifies a co-producer
- "You Mean the World to Me" features uncredited vocals by Tony Williams

Sample credits

- "Jarreau of Rap (Skatt Attack)" contains an interpolation from "(Round, Round, Round) Blue Rondo à la Turk", written and performed by Al Jarreau.
- "Lost Freestyle" contains a sample from "Accept Me (I'm Not a Girl Anymore)", written and performed by Angela Bofill.
- "Tanasia" contains samples from "Mother Russia", written by Michael Dunford and Betty Newsinger, and performed by Renaissance.
- "Adult Film" contains uncredited interpolations of "Raw", written by Antonio Hardy, and performed by Big Daddy Kane.
- "The Art of It" contains samples from "Uptown Anthem", written by Vincent Brown, Anthony Criss, and Keir Gist, and performed by Naughty by Nature; and samples from "Straighten It Out", written by Peter Phillips and CL Smooth, and performed by Pete Rock & CL Smooth, which itself samples "Our Generation", written and performed by Ernie Hines.
- "Highly Favoured" contains samples from "(If Loving You Is Wrong) I Don't Want to Be Right", written by Homer Banks, Carl Hampton and Raymond Jackson, and performed by Alton Ellis.
- "It Never Ends" contains samples from "One Way Rag", written by Colin Gibson and Kenny Craddock, and performed by Alan White.
- "You Mean the World to Me" contains samples from "Don't It Make You Feel Good?", written and performed by Leroy Hutson.
- "Beautiful Life" contains samples from "Happy Song", written by Reginald Brown, Richard Davis, and Stafford Floyd, and performed by The Dynamic Superiors.

== Charts ==
Chart (2019)	Peak position
Australian Digital Albums (ARIA)	22
Belgian Albums (Ultratop Flanders)	125
Canadian Albums (Billboard)	65
Dutch Albums (Album Top 100)	95
French Albums (SNEP)	177
UK R&B Albums	4
US Billboard 200	10
US Top R&B/Hip-Hop Albums (Billboard)	7
US Billboard Digital Albums	1
