= The Great Train Robbery (2013 TV series) =

British television drama

- Genre: Crime drama
- Based on: Great Train Robbery
- Written by: Chris Chibnall
- Directed by: Julian Jarrold; James Strong
- Starring: Luke Evans; Jim Broadbent; Paul Anderson; Jack Roth; Martin Compston; Neil Maskell; Del Synnott; Nicholas Murchie
- Theme music composer: Paul Englishby; Glenn Gregory
- Country of origin: United Kingdom
- Original language: English
- No. of series: 1
- No. of episodes: 2

Production
- Producer: Julia Stannard
- Cinematography: George Richmond; Gary Shaw
- Editors: Mark Eckersley; Billy Sneddon
- Running time: 90 minutes
- Production company: World Productions

Original release
- Network: BBC One
- Release: 18 December – 19 December 2013

The Great Train Robbery is a two-part British television historical drama, written by Chris Chibnall, that was first broadcast on BBC One on 18 and 19 December 2013. The series is distributed worldwide by Kew Media.

It tells the story of the Great Train Robbery on 8 August 1963, first from the perspective of the robbers, and then from the perspective of the police. Episode one, A Robber's Tale, details the organisation of and successful completion of the robbery. Episode two, A Copper's Tale, follows the police investigation into the crime and subsequent arrest of many of the perpetrators. Coincidentally, the first part, A Robber's Tale, was shown on the same day that train robber Ronnie Biggs died.

== Plot ==
A Robber's Tale is set between November 1962 and the aftermath of the Great Train Robbery on 8 August 1963. It begins in November 1962 at London Heathrow Airport where an earlier robbery took place, Bruce Reynolds (Luke Evans) then gathered a group of men to target the Royal Mail train heading between Glasgow and London.

A Copper's Tale begins in the early morning of 8 August 1963 after the train robbery took place. Six of the best police officers from Scotland Yard are called to help with the investigation, with DCS Tommy Butler (Jim Broadbent) in charge.

== Cast ==
The cast of "A Robber's Tale"

The cast of "A Copper's Tale"

- Luke Evans as Bruce Reynolds
- Jim Broadbent as DCS Tommy Butler
- Paul Anderson as Gordon Goody
- Jack Roth as Charlie Wilson
- Martin Compston as Roy James
- Neil Maskell as Buster Edwards
- Del Synnott as Brian Field
- Nicholas Murchie as Roger Cordery
- Jordan Long as Tommy Wisby
- Jack Gordon as Ronnie Biggs
- George Ward as Nick Reynolds
- Eric Hulme as Jack Mills
- James Bye as John Daly
- Robert Glenister as DI Frank Williams
- Bethany Muir as Franny Reynolds
- Olivia K Williams as Daughter of Charlie Wilson

=== A Robber's Tale ===
- John Voce as Billy Still
- Bill Thomas as Alf
- Nigel Collins as Bert Turner
- Dean Smith as David Whitby
- Mark Stratton as Mr Wyatt

=== A Copper's Tale ===
- Ken Bones as Com. George Hatherill
- Richard Hope as DCS Malcolm Fewtrell
- George Costigan as DCS Ernie Millen
- John Salthouse as DCI Sid Bradbury
- Tim Pigott-Smith as DS Maurice Ray
- Nick Moran as DS Jack Slipper
- Tom Chambers as DS Steve Moore
- Matthew Jure as DS Stanley Davies
- James McGregor as DC Tommy Thorburn
- Tommy McDonnell as DC Keith Milner
- Tom Beard as Dr Ian Holden
- Christine Cox as Emily Clarke
- Gwyneth Strong as Dorothy
- James Wilby as John Wheater
- James Fox as The Rt Hon Henry Brooke MP

== Production ==
The Great Train Robbery was commissioned by Ben Stephenson, controller of BBC Drama, and Danny Cohen, controller of BBC One. The executive producers are Simon Heath for World Productions, the company behind the series, and Polly Hill for the BBC. Julia Stannard is the producer of the two ninety-minute films.

The two films were first due to be broadcast in August 2013, on the 50th anniversary of the train robbery, but was postponed to December 2013 because of scheduling issues. The production was inspired by the book Signal Red by Robert Ryan.

An arrangement of "Keep On Running", performed by Louise Mitchell, was played at the beginning and end of "A Robber's Tale". This song's chart-topping version, performed by The Spencer Davis Group, was used as the opening theme to Buster, the 1988 dramatisation of the Great Train Robbery.

=== Filming ===
Filming began in Yorkshire in March 2013. Various parts of Leeds city centre were used, such as the Adelphi public house, the Calls, Briggate, Hyde Park Picture House and other parts of Hyde Park. The Keighley and Worth Valley Railway was used as Sears Crossing, where the actual robbery took place. At Keighley, a British Rail Class 37, number 37 075 was used to represent a British Rail Class 40, D326, the real locomotive involved. Other scenes were filmed at Bradford (City Hall entrance/main steps. Also at the end of part 2, the blue police light is placed where the actual police station was in City Hall originally), Shipley, Haworth and Goole. Filey was used instead of Torquay for the scenes involving Reynolds' hideout. According to the BBC, Yorkshire was the "most cost-effective and realistic alternative".

== Episodes ==
No.	Title	Directed by	Written by	Original release date	UK viewers (millions)
1	"A Robber's Tale"	Julian Jarrold	Chris Chibnall	18 December 2013	6.35
After a heist at London Heathrow Airport garners a disappointing haul, Bruce Reynolds and his gang of working-class, small-time crooks get a tip about the Royal Mail train. The daily train coming from Glasgow on the West Coast Main Line will be carrying sacks of excess currency and picking up more at each stop on its way to London. They believe up to £1 million will be on board by the time it passes through Buckinghamshire. They bring in two train experts to join the crew and plot the heist from a rented farmhouse in the Aylesbury Vale, where they plan to hide out for a week until things calm down. But when the heist nets a record amount of more than £2.6 million (equivalent to £47 million in 2020), Reynolds knows the police will be hot on their trail.
2	"A Copper's Tale"	James Strong	Chris Chibnall	19 December 2013	5.99
Four days after the biggest robbery in British history to date, Flying Squad Detective Chief Superintendent Tommy Butler is brought in to lead the investigation by the Home Secretary. Though the heist occurred in Buckinghamshire, Butler is convinced it was organised by London criminals, and he compiles his own dream team of detectives to hunt them down. They come up with shortlists of suspects among known criminals and Bruce Reynolds is on that list. A £10,000 reward for information leads to a tip from a neighbour about the rented farmhouse, but they are soon drowning in hoax callers and fake tips. Informants help them track down and arrest the gang one by one until three years after the robbery, when only one man is still at large: Bruce Reynolds.

== Reception ==
According to Cheshire Today, the BBC was criticised for glorifying criminals when it announced the series.

=== Ratings ===
Overnight figures showed that A Robber's Tale, the first episode of The Great Train Robbery, was watched by 23.2% of the viewing audience for that time, with 5.23 million watching it. The second episode, A Copper's Tale, had a 23.1% audience share and 4.95 million viewers, according to overnight figures.

=== Critical reception ===
A Robber's Tale received a mixed response. Metro journalist Keith Watson gave the film two stars out of five and said he would have liked to have seen more background on the gang members. The Daily Telegraph's Tom Rowley gave it four stars out of five and noted the high attention to detail by Chris Chibnall. Sam Wollaston from The Guardian said A Robber's Tale "beautifully explores the dynamic of a gang of men".

=== Awards ===
The Great Train Robbery received a BAFTA nomination in 2014.

== Home media ==
The two films have been released on DVD by publisher Acorn Media UK and is available from the BBC. It was released at other outlets on 6 January 2014.
