= Poppa's Got a Brand New Badge =

- The Simpsons episode
- The SpringShield commercial
- Episode no.: Season 13; Episode 22
- Directed by: Pete Michels
- Written by: Dana Gould
- Production code: DABF17
- Original air date: May 22, 2002

Guest appearance
- Joe Mantegna as Fat Tony

Episode features
- Couch gag: The Simpsons run to the couch, and find The Blue Man Group performing.
- Commentary: Al Jean; Matt Selman; Dana Gould; Carolyn Omine; Joe Mantegna; Pete Michels

Episode chronology
← Previous "The Frying Game"	Next → "Treehouse of Horror XIII"
- The Simpsons season 13

"Poppa's Got a Brand New Badge" is the twenty-second and final episode of the thirteenth season of the American animated television series The Simpsons. It first aired on the Fox network in the United States on May 22, 2002. In the episode, a massive heatwave causes the residents of Springfield to install large air conditioning devices in their homes. This leads the Springfield Nuclear Power Plant to overload, causing two town-wide blackouts to occur. The Springfield Police Department are unable to face the riots that follow, prompting Homer, dissatisfied with the police's incompetence, to start his own security company, called SpringShield.

"Poppa's Got a Brand New Badge" was directed by Pete Michels and written by Dana Gould, who also pitched the idea for the episode. It features American actor Joe Mantegna as recurring character Fat Tony, and includes references to Dragnet, High Noon and The Sopranos.

In its original broadcast, the episode was seen by approximately 5.3 million viewers, finishing in 53rd place in the ratings the week it aired. Following its home video release on August 24, 2010, the episode received mixed reviews from critics.

The episode was dedicated to the memory of Stephen Jay Gould who died two days before it aired. He had voiced himself in the ninth-season episode "Lisa the Skeptic".

== Plot ==
Springfield is in the midst of a massive heat wave. Every building in the town has installed a large air conditioning device. However, this draws a lot of power from the Springfield Nuclear Power Plant. Despite the safety measures Mr. Burns has taken (cutting power to the orphanage), the plant is at full power. At home, without an air conditioning device, the Simpsons have to follow an old-fashioned fan. Homer decides to give them a taste of winter by plugging in his dancing Santa Claus. This overloads the plant and causes a town-wide blackout. After Lenny and Carl accidentally crash their cars into a store with no active alarm and decide to loot it, widespread rioting and looting occur. The police try to intervene, but are powerless to stop the massive crime wave.

The next day, Springfield has been devastated by the crime wave. Mayor Quimby decides to take legal action by forming a blue-ribbon committee. At the Simpsons' house, someone steals Lisa's Malibu Stacy collection. Homer decides to take action by looking for it. He finds the culprit, Jimbo Jones, and later foils a robbery by Snake Jailbird at the Kwik-E-Mart. He goes through a very long list of his previous jobs (during which Marge puts curlers in her hair off-screen) and decides that he likes the idea of combining his love of helping and hurting people. Homer forms his own security company called "SpringShield". Although it only has Homer, Lenny, and Carl, it is more efficient and more successful than the Springfield Police Department. When Quimby sees Chief Wiggum trying to shoot a Piñata with a shotgun while blindfolded, in a fit of rage he dismisses Wiggum and makes Homer the chief of police on live television.

After stopping one of Fat Tony's operations, Homer practically rids Springfield of crime. However, Fat Tony escapes and vows to kill Homer unless he leaves town. Homer is unable to get protection from the citizens he protects (only Ned Flanders volunteers, but Homer ignores his offer) and Lenny and Carl lock themselves in a jail cell. When Homer does not leave, Fat Tony arrives with a few of his own henchmen (including Johnny Tightlips), as well as mafia muscle—Christopher Moltisanti, Paulie Gualtieri, and Silvio Dante from The Sopranos series.

Just before they are about to kill Homer, an unseen sniper shoots the mobsters; injuring them and causing them to flee. Safe again, Homer resigns as police chief and offers the job to the first person who comes along, which is Wiggum (who notes that an identical situation is how he became chief in the first place). When Marge thanks him for saving Homer, Wiggum says that he did not shoot anyone, having lost his gun, badge and nearly his squad car. Unbeknownst to them, the person who saved Homer was Maggie, who fires at the mobsters from her window with a scoped sporting rifle.

== Production ==
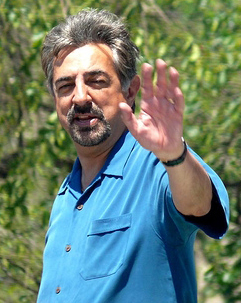
Joe Mantegna portrayed Fat Tony in the episode.

"Poppa's Got a Brand New Badge" was written by Dana Gould and directed by Pete Michels. It was first broadcast on the Fox network in the United States on May 22, 2002. The idea for the episode was also pitched by Gould, who had just moved to southern California with his wife. After moving in, the two decided to install an alarm system because, Gould quipped, "the police aren't enough. Too many people wanna kill you." When meeting the other writers, Gould pitched an episode in which Homer becomes the owner of a security company, which then became "Poppa's Got a Brand New Badge." Although current showrunner Al Jean found it "very funny," the episode's first draft was heavily altered after the first table-read, a process in which the script is read out loud to the other writers.

During the blackout, Lenny and Carl accidentally crash their cars into a store, causing a riot to erupt. The sequence was conceived by Gould who, after the 1992 Los Angeles riots, was "somewhat obsessed" with civil unrest issues. In the DVD commentary for the episode, he said "I love the idea of, 'All you need is for the power to go out and slowly the fabric of society unravels." While trying to determine who stole Lisa's Malibu Stacy car, Homer holds Bart as his prime suspect. Unbeknownst to Bart, who is eating an apple, Homer tells Lisa "Look at him over there, eating that apple. What is he planning?" Originally, the scene would show Homer suspecting Lisa, but because it bothered the character's voice actor, Yeardley Smith, the scene was changed. American actor Joe Mantegna reprises his role as Fat Tony in the episode.

In another scene in the episode, Homer shows his family an advertisement for his security company. In it, a monster is seen breaking into an elderly woman's house. When the woman screams, the screen freezes and Homer is composited to the screen, instructing the audience about SpringShield's telephone number. In order to composite Homer into the screen, director Michels made use of a greenscreen. The advertisement resumes and the monster is subdued by Homer, Lenny and Carl. Confused, the monster turns to Homer and asks, "friend?" to which Homer replies "the only friend you need is SpringShield," and holds a business card in front of the camera. The monster then puts the card in his wallet and says "monster put in wallet." The monster's last line was written during one of the episode's rewrites, but none of the writers on The Simpsons' writing staff has taken credit for it. The line has since become very popular with the series' writing staff; Jean said that it was "very funny and unusual for a television show," and Gould considers it to be his favourite joke in any episode he has ever written.

At the end of the episode, Maggie saves Homer by shooting Fat Tony's gang members with a rifle, as a reference to the two-part episode Who Shot Mr. Burns? from seasons 6 and 7, in which it is ultimately revealed that Maggie shot Burns after his gun fell into her hands. The scene was conceived by series co-creator and executive producer James L. Brooks while writing notes during the episode's first table-read.

While "The Frying Game" was originally thought to be the last episode of the season, "Poppa's Got a Brand New Badge" was later revealed to be the real season finale. Although new episodes of The Simpsons usually air on Sundays, "Poppa's Got a Brand New Badge" aired on Wednesday, May 22, 2002. On August 24, 2010, "Poppa's Got a Brand New Badge" was released as part of The Simpsons: The Complete Thirteenth Season DVD and Blu-ray set. Al Jean, Matt Selman, Carolyn Omine, Dana Gould, Joe Mantegna and Pete Michels participated in the audio commentary of the episode.

== Cultural references ==
In a scene in the episode, Homer tells Marge about all the jobs he has had, referencing several episodes of the series. According to Jean, the scene was added during a rewrite of the episode's script. In another scene, Homer, in the Springfield church, attempts to recruit companions for his security company. The scene is a reference to the 1952 American western film High Noon, although the line "You all know me" was taken from the American horror/thriller film Jaws. When visiting the clothing store Wooly Bully, Homer has a rapid, monotone conversation with the cashier. The two speak in a similar manner to the characters in the American 1950s television crime drama Dragnet, of which Gould was a "big fan".

When noticing that one of his ferrets is wearing a wire, Fat Tony tells it "you're not a pet, and you're not a friend. You're nothing to me." The line parodies a similar conversation between Michael and Fredo Corleone in the American gangster film The Godfather Part II. Near the end of the episode, Fat Tony drives to the Simpsons house in what seems to be a white Dodge Caravan, while shots of Springfield are shown on the way. The scene parodies the title sequence of the American television drama series The Sopranos, and features Alabama 3's song "Woke Up This Morning," which is also used in The Sopranos' title sequence. Michels stated that the parody was "very fun" to animate; "Being from New Jersey, it was a labor of love," he said in the episode's DVD commentary.

The episode title is a reference to the James Brown song "Papa's Got A Brand New Bag". The monster of SpringShield commercial is a parody of The New Woody Woodpecker Show Badger character, including a quote "Hey buddy".

== Reception ==
In its original American broadcast, "Poppa's Got a Brand New Badge" received a 5.0 rating, according to Nielsen Media Research, translating to approximately 5.3 million viewers. The episode finished in 53rd place in the ratings for the week of May 20–26, 2002. Together with the first half-hour of Celebrity Boxing, the shows averaged a 3.9 rating among adults between ages 18 and 49, pushing Fox to number two for the night, just behind NBC. Some listings do not name this show as the Season 13 finale because it aired outside of the series' regular Sunday 8PM EST timeslot; those listings name this episode as a "special airing" and list The Frying Game as the S13 finale instead.

Following its home video release, "Poppa's Got a Brand New Badge" received mixed reviews from critics. Writing for 411Mania, Ron Martin gave the episode a mixed review, calling it "passable." He wrote that "Poppa's Got a Brand New Badge" is "far from memorable as season finales should be." DVD Movie Guide's Colin Jacobson wrote "Like many S13 episodes, "Badge" feels more than a little derivative," describing the episode as a combination of the season 4 episode "Mr. Plow" and the season 5 episode "Homer the Vigilante". He continued by writing "That doesn’t mean the show lacks amusement, but it’s too rehashed to end the year with a real winner." Nate Boss of Project-Blu described it as "A random episode, without many laughs," however, he added that it "could have been worse."

Giving the episode a positive review, Jennifer Malkowski of DVD Verdict gave it a B+, billing "Homer's 'You know I've had a lot of jobs' list" as the episode's "highlight". Writing for Screen Jabber, Stuart O'Connor was favorable as well, describing it as a "first-rate ep[isode]". Screen Rant called it the best episode of the 13th season.
