= The Lost Tapes (Nas album) =

Compilation album by Nas
- Released: September 23, 2002
- Recorded: 1998–2001
- Genre: Hip-hop
- Length: 43:02
- Labels: Ill Will; Columbia
- Producers: The Alchemist; Deric "D-Dot" Angelettie; Hill, Inc.; L.E.S.; Poke and Tone; Precision; Rockwilder; Al West; Kanye West (co.)

Nas chronology
Stillmatic (2001)	The Lost Tapes (2002)	God's Son (2002)

The Lost Tapes is a compilation album by American rapper Nas. It was released on September 23, 2002, by Ill Will Records and Columbia Records, who wanted to capitalize on what was seen in hip-hop as Nas' artistic comeback the year before, and compiles previously unreleased tracks that were discarded from recording sessions for the rapper's previous studio albums I Am... (1999) and Stillmatic (2001). It features production by L.E.S., The Alchemist, Poke and Tone, and Deric "D-Dot" Angelettie, among others. With low-key, sparse sounds and observational lyrics about urban life, the songs are largely autobiographical and nostalgic, departing from the thug persona of Nas' previous records.

Released with little promotion, The Lost Tapes debuted and peaked at number 10 on the Billboard 200, selling over 70,000 copies in its first week. It received widespread acclaim from critics, some of whom viewed it as Nas' best record since his 1994 debut album Illmatic. A second volume of previously unreleased songs was planned before Nas had signed with Def Jam Recordings in 2006, but the project was delayed because of issues with his record label; The Lost Tapes 2 was eventually released on July 19, 2019.

== Background ==
In 2001, Nas made an artistic comeback with the release of his fifth album Stillmatic and his highly publicized feud with rapper Jay-Z. Both events revitalized his image in hip-hop at the time, following a string of commercially successful but critically subpar albums. Nas' record label, Columbia Records, capitalized on his comeback with a promotional campaign that included the release of two archival albums, the extended play From Illmatic to Stillmatic: The Remixes and The Lost Tapes, while leading up to the release of his 2002 studio album God's Son.

== Preparation ==
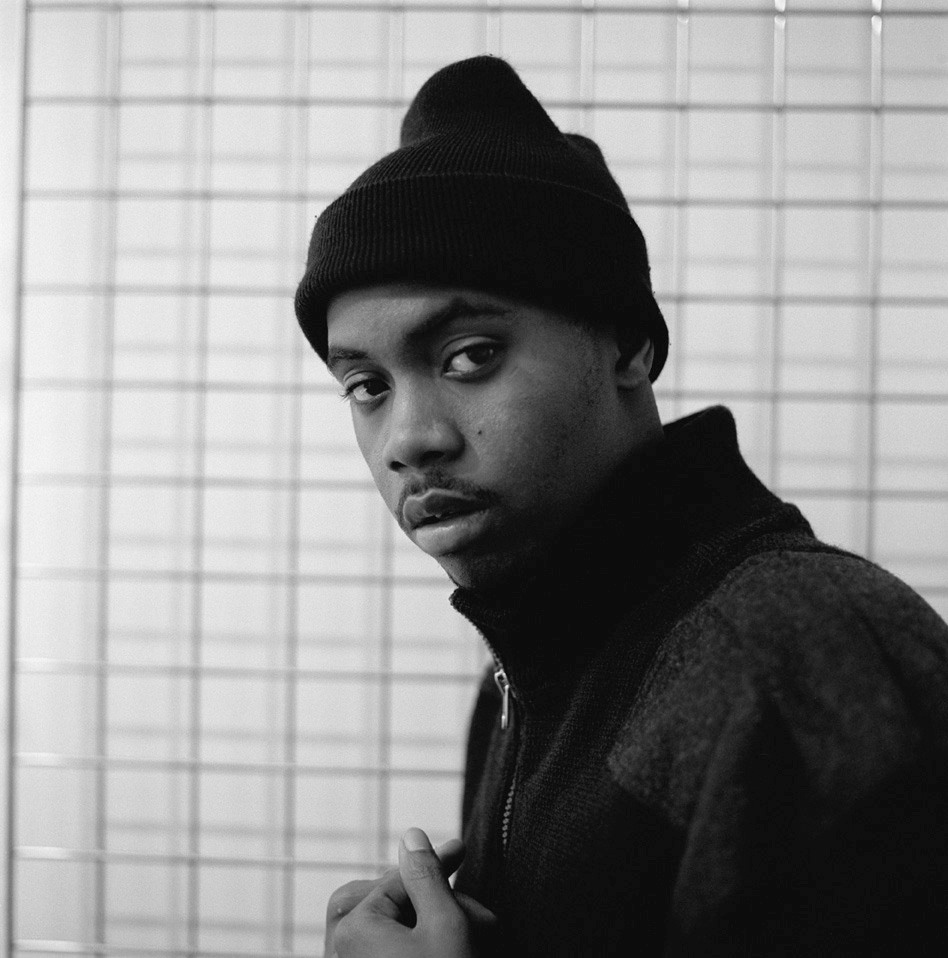
Nas in 1998

The Lost Tapes compiles previously unreleased tracks that Nas recorded during 1998 to 2001 in the sessions for both his 1999 album I Am... and Stillmatic. Several songs from the sessions for the former album, including "Blaze a 50", "Drunk by Myself", and "Poppa Was a Playa", were bootlegged prior to its release and leaked to the Internet through MP3 technology, which led to their exclusion from I Am.... Most of the compiled songs first became available as bootlegs on underground mixtapes before being selected and mastered for The Lost Tapes.

Songs on The Lost Tapes were recorded in several recording studios in New York, including Right Track Studios, The Hit Factory Studios, and Sony Studios in New York City, Lobo Studios in Long Island, and Music Palace in West Hempstead, as well as South Beach Studios in Miami, Florida and Westlake Studios in Santa Monica, California. Production was handled by The Alchemist, L.E.S., Poke and Tone, Precision, Rockwilder, Al West, Deric "D-Dot" Angelettie, and Hill, Inc. The album was packaged with a booklet featuring artwork by Chris "C-Money" Feldman and photography by Kareem Black, along with liner notes displaying the slogan "No cameos. No hype. No bullsh*t".

== Music and lyrics ==
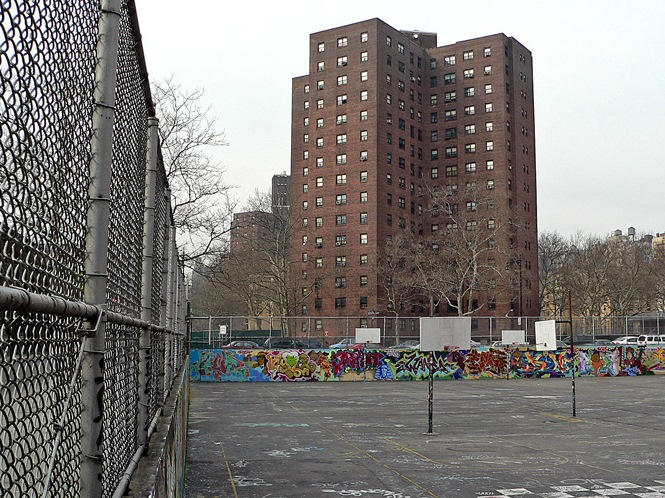
The Lost Tapes features sociological themes, narratives, and commentary on urban life (New York City public housing project pictured).

The Lost Tapes features introspective lyrics and themes of urban life, sociology, and despair. Its music is characterized by low-key beats, sparse production, subtle string flourishes, mellow piano work, and subdued soul music loops. Stylus Magazine's Brett Berliner said songs such as "Doo Rags" and "No Idea's Original" incorporate classical melodies, while songs such as "Purple" and "Fetus" feature neo-classical themes. John Bush of AllMusic said the songs "have more in common with his early recordings; there's more of a back-in-the-day, wasn't-it-all-so-simple-then sound to 'Doo Rags' and 'Poppa Was a Playa,' two tracks that definitely wouldn't have fit on the raging Stillmatic." Music writer Craig Seymour observed "spare beats" in the music and few boasts in Nas' rapping, while Chris Conti from the Boston Phoenix said the simple beats "counteract Nas's complex bars of braggadocio and street-life storytelling."

According to Robert Christgau, The Lost Tapes abandons the thug persona of Nas' previous work in favor of more sensitive, nostalgic, and autobiographical lyrics. Slate magazine's David Samuels interpreted "a message that begins with a rejection of the materialism of his ... rival Jay-Z" and "the home truth about how most kids in the projects feel about the real-life gangstas who live in their neighborhoods", citing "No Idea's Original" as an example. New York Daily News writer Jim Farber commented on his lyrical observations, "Nas focuses on linear scenarios and on human motivations ... "unlike many hard rappers, Nas' tales of ghetto horror are not covert boasts but expressions of true fear". Farber took note of "a cinematic tale of self-destruction in 'Drunk by Myself,' and a compelling autobiography narrated from the womb in 'Fetus.' "

"No Idea's Original"
The song was produced by The Alchemist and recorded in the sessions for Nas' 2001 album Stillmatic.

The opening track "Doo Rags" contemplates Nas' youth and society's cyclical nature. It features a contemporary piano loop and jazz tones. Richard Hazell from HipHopDX describes the song as "a piano propelled painting of time and space as seen through the third eye of Nas, which can easily be envisioned by any New York City dweller." On "My Way", he meditates over his rise out of poverty to the "life of a rich thug", recalls the death of his childhood friend Ill Will, and concedes that he "still feels broke with millions in the bank." On "U Gotta Love It", Nas makes reference to the "'86 crack blitz" and discusses his own significance: "This thug life you claimed it, I make millions from entertainment / Now back in the hood, certain cats they wanna kill me / They ice-grill me, but on the low, niggas feel me." "Nothing Lasts Forever" advises to appreciate life's small epiphanies and be optimistic about the future. On "No Idea's Original", Nas notes the similarities of people in life and views other rappers as creatively derivative, while distinguishing himself from them: "No idea's original, there's nothin new under the sun / It's never what you do, but how it's done / What you base your happiness around material, women, and large paper / That means you inferior, not major." He references the line "there's nothing new under the sun" from the Book of Ecclesiastes in the song's chorus. "No Idea's Original" samples Barry White's 1973 song "I'm Gonna Love You Just a Little More Baby", a frequently sampled recording in hip-hop.

"Blaze a 50" features a violin-based instrumental and a complex narrative that follows a tale of murder, sex, and betrayal. Nas narrates the tale in conventional fashion until the ending, at which the track rewinds to an earlier point and he revises his original ending. "Everybody's Crazy" features complex rhymes and braggadocio rap by Nas: "Gangsta see, gangsta do / A Langston Hughes predecessor / Gun in my dresser, slang I use." In "Purple"'s narrative, Nas lights up a blunt and expresses his thoughts, including criticism of hoodlums and their effect on their neighborhoods: "The 'hood love you, but behind your back they pray for the day / A bullet hit your heart and ambulance take you away / That ain't love it's hate / Think of all the mothers at wakes / Whose sons you've killed and you ain't got a cut on your face?" "Drunk by Myself" has lyrics concerning alcohol and self-medication.

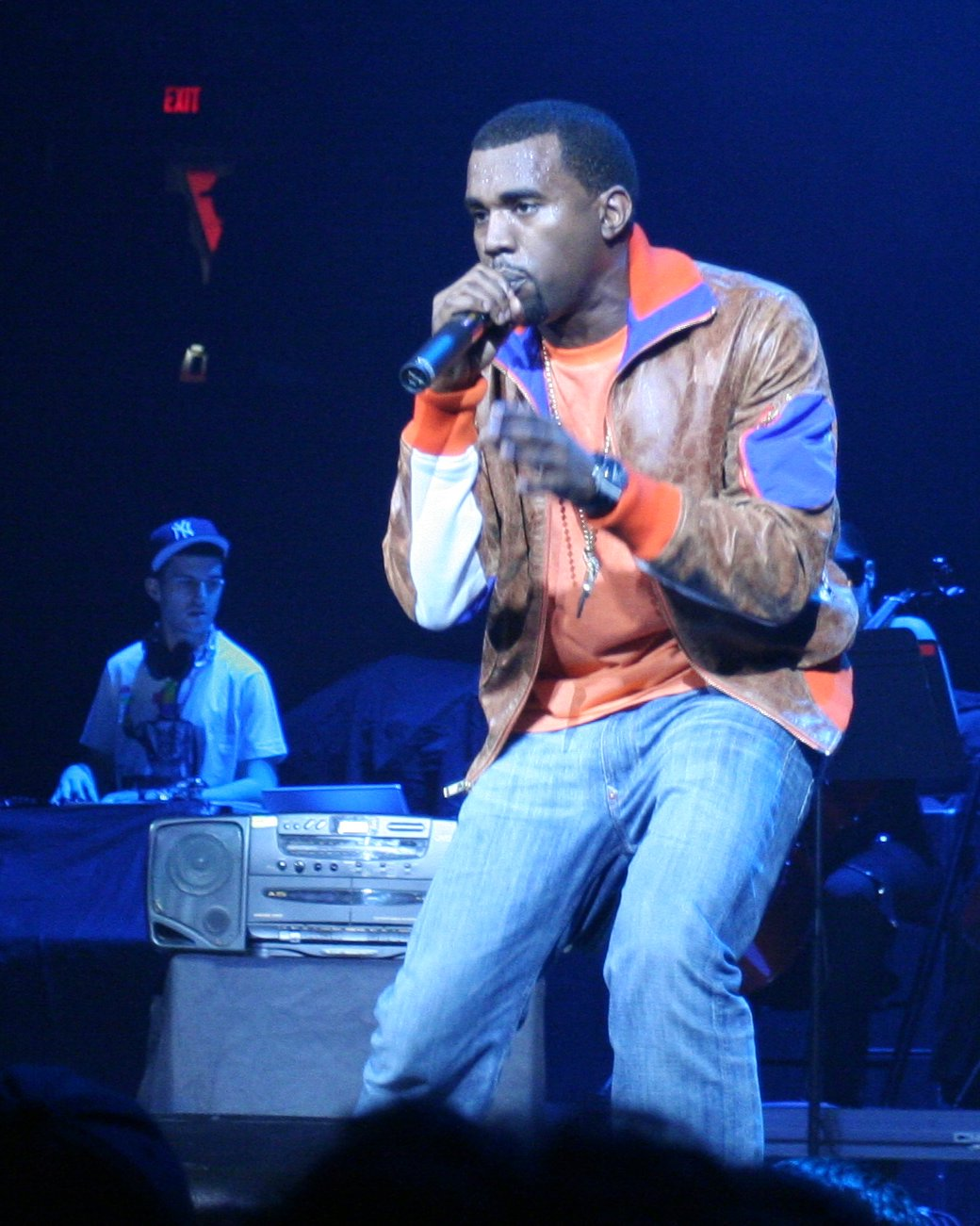
"Poppa Was a Playa" was co-produced by Kanye West (pictured here in 2005).

"Black Zombie" is an impassioned, self-reflective critique of problems afflicting the African-American community, including prejudice ("You believe when they say we ain't shit, we can't grow / All we are is dope dealers and gangstas and hoes"), economic insolvency ("What do we own? The skin on our backs / We rent and we ask for reparations, then they hit us with tax"), and dependency ("I'm a Columbia record slave / So get paid / Control your own destiny, you are a genius / Don't let it happen to you like it did to me, I was a black zombie"). Its socially conscious lyrics deride media stereotypes of African Americans, inequality in the educational system, and black-on-black violence. According to writer Dax-Devlon Ross, the song foreshadowed the themes and "world view" of Nas' subsequent albums. "Poppa Was a Playa" features uncredited co-production by Kanye West, and discusses Nas' complicated relationship with his father, jazz musician Olu Dara, addressing his lusty, itinerant lifestyle throughout Nas' youth. Gabriel Alvarez of Complex calls it an "honest dedication to his old man: a jazz player, a rolling stone" and writes of the song, "The love is there despite the man's faults. Nas crafts a full picture of the past, looking at the infidelity and fights from both parents' perspectives."

An untitled hidden track follows "Poppa Was a Playa" and has Nas rapping from the perspective of his prenatal self. It was originally recorded for I Am... and had planned titles "Fetus" and "Belly Button Window". The track opens with solemn guitar chords and the sound of bubbling liquid before being overlaid with a beat and a piano riff. An introductory verse is delivered by Nas in a spoken word tone: "Yeah. I want all my niggas to come journey with me / My name is Nas, and the year is 1973 / The beginning of me / Therefore I can see / Through my belly button window / Who I am." The narrative follows the time before his birth, covering subject matter such as his parents fighting and his expectations for life. In Book of Rhymes: The Poetics of Hip Hop (2009), writer Adam Bradley denotes the track's lyrical narrative of an MC's story of birth as "one of the core narratives in rap", having its roots in a similar autobiographical convention found in African-American slave narratives. Of Nas' narrative, Bradley states, "By endowing the insensible with voice, he aspires to an expressive level that transcends speaking for oneself, or of oneself, to one that self-consciously constructs itself as an artist giving shape to that which lacks coherence."

== Marketing and sales ==
The Lost Tapes was released by Ill Will Records and Columbia Records, and distributed through Sony Music Entertainment. It was first released on September 23 in the United Kingdom, then September 24 in the United States, October 9 in Japan – where it was issued with three bonus tracks – and January 20, 2003, in Australia. The release received little marketing, with hip-hop journalist Rob Markman noting no promotional music videos were produced and Nas' absence from the cover.

On October 2, 2002, The Lost Tapes was reported to have sold more than 70,000 copies in its first week of release, giving it a chart debut of number 10 on the Billboard 200. It ultimately spent eight weeks on the chart. It also charted at number three on the Billboard Top R&B/Hip-Hop Albums. By July 2008, the album had sold 340,000 copies in the US, according to Nielsen SoundScan.

== Critical reception ==
Professional ratings
Aggregate scores
Source	Rating
Metacritic	81/100
Review scores
Source	Rating
AllMusic	3.5/5 stars
Boston Phoenix	3/4 stars
Entertainment Weekly	A−
HipHopDX	4.5/5
Pitchfork	6.9/10
Rolling Stone	4/5 stars
The Source	4.5/5 stars
Spin	8/10
The Village Voice	B+
XXL	5/5

The Lost Tapes was met with widespread critical acclaim. At Metacritic, which assigns a normalized rating out of 100 to reviews from professional publications, the album received an average score of 81, based on 12 reviews.

Reviewing for Entertainment Weekly in September 2002, Craig Seymour said Nas' "gritty, yet hopeful, reflections make Lost Tapes a real find." Rolling Stone critic Jon Caramanica hailed it as "the real Stillmatic", writing that it "displays Nas' gifts for tightly stitched narrative and stunningly precise detail." In The A.V. Club, Nathan Rabin deemed it a masterpiece whose assorted tracks cohere as well as any of Nas' official studio albums while reaffirming his reputation as "rap music's poet laureate of urban despair". Ken Capobianco from The Boston Globe said the leftover songs prove why Nas had so much promise early in his career, while Spin's Chris Ryan viewed the record as a hip-hop version of Bob Dylan's much-bootlegged Basement Tapes—"a raw document [that] still proves that Nas had it all along." PopMatters critic Marc Lamont Hill called it a "masterfully arranged" and "necessary addition to the collection of any hip-hop fan". In The Village Voice, Christgau was particularly impressed by the four autobiographical songs closing the album, preferring them to other songs he felt are nothing more than outtakes. In a less enthusiastic review, Brett Berliner from Stylus Magazine wrote that as good as the songs were, "they don't make a real album ... [more] like a superb mixtape", while Billboard's Rashaun Hall believed the production on some of the songs sounds outdated.

In a retrospective review, AllMusic editor John Bush recommended The Lost Tapes to "hip-hop fans who want to hear some great rhyming with no added features" and commented that tracks such as "Doo Rags", "No Idea's Original", and "Black Zombie" "stand up to anything Nas has recorded since the original Illmatic." Jesal Padania of RapReviews commented that the album "proves remarkably consistent throughout, and is a superb listening experience", and considered it a studio release, stating "this is a short sharp shock of awesome lyricism, and many, unofficially, consider this to be the closest cousin we will ever get to Illmatic II." Pitchfork's Ryan Dombal cited the album as one of Nas' "finest moments". About.com's Henry Adaso called it "noteworthy because of its superiority to half the stuff in Nas' catalog." In The Rolling Stone Album Guide (2004), Chris Ryan was less enthusiastic about the album, finding it "somewhat inconsistent, and certainly too scattered to be considered an album per se," even though it features "some classics, such as the nostalgic 'Doo Rags,' that are not to be missed." In its 2007 issue, XXL included The Lost Tapes in its list of "classic" albums to be given the publication's maximum "XXL" rating. In 2012, Complex included The Lost Tapes in their list of "25 Rap Albums From the Past Decade That Deserve Classic Status".

== Sequel ==
A follow-up compilation, The Lost Tapes II, was originally intended to be released on December 16, 2003, and include unreleased recordings, remixes, and freestyle tracks. However, its release was delayed, and in 2006, Nas signed to Def Jam Recordings. In a June 2010 interview for Hot 97.5 KVEG, he said of following-up The Lost Tapes, "I do got a lot of songs that really didn't make no album, that's just sittin' around [or] got lost. So I've got enough actually, for a Lost Tapes 2 and 3 by now. So I've just got to set it up, put them together – 12 songs for one album, 12 songs for another album, and figure it out. That's all it takes." In September, he announced plans to release The Lost Tapes 2 on December 14. However, its release was further delayed by Def Jam, whom Nas accused of mishandling the project and its budget in a personal e-mail sent to label executives. Reports of the project's delay incited fans to create an online petition in December asking for Def Jam to release the album. After losing time to the project's delay, Nas began recording for a new studio album and put plans for The Lost Tapes 2 on hold. In a May 2011 interview for MTV News, he explained why the sequel was abandoned:

When I released Lost Tapes, it was on Sony. Being at Sony for so long, I was used to things going easy. Kinda easy. At Def Jam, I just got there, I'm still in my ways at Sony. I'm like, 'yeah, this record'll come out this time, a few months later I'ma drop this.' But we just started working together, so they're like, 'We can do this, but wait, maybe we should do it like this,' and I wasn't used to that. And then there was no communication at all, and I wasn't used to that. With Sony, I wasn't used to a lot of communication, it was just, we understood what we were doing. [...] Def Jam, it was more, 'Let's sit down, let's have tea and talk this over.' I wasn't so used to that, and I saw kinda things falling behind. It kinda messed up my flow, I thought. The timing for that is gone. Now, it's all about the new record.

On June 11, 2019, Nas shared a promotional video via his Instagram account, announcing the release of The Lost Tapes 2 in the near future. Its track listing and cover art were revealed on July 2, and the album was released on July 19.

== Track listing ==
No.	Title	Writer(s)	Producer(s)	Length
1.	"Doo Rags"	Nasir Jones; Larry Gates; Michelle Lynn Bell	Precision	4:03
2.	"My Way"	Jones; Alan Maman	The Alchemist	3:55
3.	"U Gotta Love It"	Jones; Leshan Lewis; Carlos Wilson; Louis Wilson; Ricardo Wilson	L.E.S.	3:18
4.	"Nothing Lasts Forever"	Jones; Lewis	L.E.S.	3:52
5.	"No Idea's Original"	Jones; Maman; Barry White	The Alchemist	3:04
6.	"Blaze a 50"	Jones; L.E.S.; Jean-Claude Olivier; Samuel Barnes	L.E.S.; Poke and Tone	2:49
7.	"Everybody's Crazy"	Jones; Dana Stinson	Rockwilder	3:35
8.	"Purple"	Jones; Tommie Spearman	Hill, Inc.	3:39
9.	"Drunk by Myself"	Jones; Al West; Barnes; Oliver	Al West; Poke and Tone	4:03
10.	"Black Zombie"	Jones; Spearman	Hill, Inc.	3:35
11.	"Poppa Was a Playa"	Jones; Deric Angelettie; Allan Wayne Felder; Norman Ray Harris	Deric "D-Dot" Angelettie; Kanye West (co.)	3:44
12.	"Fetus"	Jon Shriver; Nasir Jones	Shrive Alive AKA Jon Shriver	3:19
Total length:				43:02

Japan edition bonus tracks
No.	Title	Writer(s)	Producer(s)	Length
13.	"It Ain't Hard to Tell" (Large Professor Remix)	Highleigh Crizoe; Jones; William Paul Mitchell	Large Professor	2:51
14.	"Affirmative Action" (Remix) (featuring Foxy Brown and AZ)	Dave Atkinson; Barnes; Anthony Cruz; Jones; Inga Marchand; Cory McKay; Olivier	Dave Atkinson; Poke and Tone	3:23
15.	"One Mic" (Remix)	Tyrone Fyffe; Jones; James Mtume	Ty Fyffe	4:34
Total length:				53:40

Notes

- "U Gotta Love It" contains excerpts from the composition "Love Song" performed by Mandrill, written by Carlos Wilson, Louis Wilson, and Ricardo Wilson.
- "No Idea's Original" contains excerpts from "I'm Gonna Love You Just a Little More Baby" written and performed by Barry White.
- "Poppa Was a Playa" contains excerpts from the composition "The Newness Is Gone" written by Allan Wayne Felder and Norman Ray Harris, performed by Eddie Kendricks.
- A hidden track begins at 3:49 of track 11.

== Personnel ==
Credits are adapted from the album's liner notes.

- The Alchemist – producer
- Julian Alexander – artwork
- Deric "D-Dot" Angelettie – producer
- Pablo Arraya – assistant engineer, mixing assistant
- Kareem Black – photography
- Kevin Crouse – engineer, mixing
- Chris "C-Money" Feldman – artwork
- Bryan Golder – engineer
- Paul Gregory – assistant engineer
- Hill, Inc. – producer
- Ken "Duro" Ifill – engineer
- L.E.S. – producer
- Nikki Martin – coordination
- Jonathan Merritt – assistant engineer, mixing assistant
- Nas – composer, executive producer
- Lenny "Linen" Nicholson – A&R
- Jake Ninan – assistant engineer
- Poke and Tone – producer
- Precision – producer
- Rockwilder – producer
- John Shriver – engineer
- Grayson Sumby – assistant engineer, mixing assistant
- Richard Travali – mixing
- Al West – producer

== Charts ==
Chart (2002)	Peak position
Canadian Albums (Nielsen SoundScan)	52
Canadian R&B Albums (Nielsen SoundScan)	10
French Albums (SNEP)	104
Swiss Albums (Schweizer Hitparade)	50
US Billboard 200	10
US Top R&B/Hip-Hop Albums (Billboard)	3

=== Year-end charts ===
Chart (2002)	Position
Canadian R&B Albums (Nielsen SoundScan)	174
Canadian Rap Albums (Nielsen SoundScan)	87

== See also ==
- Conscious hip-hop
- Nas discography

== Bibliography ==
- Bradley, Adam (February 23, 2009). Book of Rhymes: The Poetics of Hip Hop. Basic Civitas Books. ISBN 978-0-465-00347-1.
- Ryan, Chris (November 1, 2004). "Nas". In Brackett, Nathan; Hoard, Christian (eds.). The New Rolling Stone Album Guide (Revised and Updated 4th ed.). Simon & Schuster. ISBN 0-7432-0169-8.
- Ross, Dax-Devlon (June 1, 2008). The Nightmare and the Dream: Nas, Jay-Z and the History of Conflict in African-American Culture. Outside the Box Publishing. ISBN 978-0-9817398-1-6.
- Lazerine, Cameron; Lazerine, Devin (February 29, 2008). Rap-Up: The Ultimate Guide to Hip-Hop and R&B. Hachette Digital. ISBN 978-0-446-17820-4.
