= Shoplifting 4 Jesus =

Studio album by Alabama 3
- Released: 7 November 2011
- Recorded: Jamm Studios, Brixton
- Genre: Country/Acid House
- Length: 54 minutes approx.
- Label: Hostage Music
- Producer: Alabama 3, John "Segs" Jennings

Alabama 3 chronology
There Will Be Peace in the Valley... When We Get the Keys to the Mansion on the Hill (2011)	Shoplifting 4 Jesus (2011)	The Men from W.O.M.B.L.E. (2013)

Shoplifting 4 Jesus is the ninth studio album by British acid-house band, Alabama 3. It was released on 7 November 2011 through Hostage Music Ltd and featured no singles. It was released in the same year as the band's acoustic album, There Will Be Peace...

Dan Lucas of Drowned in Sound rated it a 7 out of 10.

== Recording and touring ==
The album was recorded at Jamm Studios, Brixton, in the summer of 2011. Larry Love teamed up with Seggs "Ruts D.C. and uber producer Wizard who replaced Peers Marsh. Larry describes the album as a mixture of provocation, thievery and digital deviance. Marsh (52) left the band in late 2010 for unknown reasons.

== Track listing ==
1. "Have You Been Having a Nightmare?"
2. "I Blame Kurt Cobain"
3. "We Stole The Moon"
4. "It's About That Time"
5. "Star Intro"
6. "I've Been Seeing Stars (Ain't Seen the Light)"
7. "Wrong is Right"
8. "Saved"
9. "Facebook.con"
10. "Black Dog"
11. "Summer in the City"
12. "Who the Fuck is John Sinclaire?"
13. "Let's Go Out 2Nite"
14. "Abide With Me"

All songs written by Alabama 3

== Personnel ==
- Reverend D.Wayne Love – vocals
- Sir 'Eddie' Real – percussion
- Rock Freebase – guitar
- L.B. Dope – drums
- Steve Finnerty – guitar, vocals, keys, production
- Larry Love – vocals
- Aurora Dawn – vocals
- Frank Zappatista – bass, vocals
- The Spirit of Love – keyboards
- Wizard - Co Production, Recording & Mixdown Engineer

Also featuring:

- Sister Tallulah Boo
- Reverend B.Atwell
- Errol T
- Sister Francesca Love
- Rob Walsh (Cold Comfort)
