= Stillmatic =

Studio album by Nas
- Released: December 18, 2001
- Recorded: 2000–2001
- Genre: East Coast hip-hop
- Length: 56:34
- Labels: Ill Will; Columbia
- Producers: Megahertz; Baby Paul; Chucky Thompson; DJ Premier; Hangmen 3; L.E.S.; Large Professor; Lofey; Mike Risko; Nas; Ron Browz; Salaam Remi; Trackmasters; Precision

Nas chronology
| Nastradamus (1999) | Stillmatic (2001) | The Lost Tapes (2002) |

Singles from Stillmatic
- 1. "Rule" Released: October 6, 2001; 2. "Got Ur Self a Gun" Released: December 4, 2001; 3. "The Flyest" Released: December 16, 2001; 4. "One Mic" Released: April 16, 2002

Stillmatic is the fifth studio album by American rapper Nas, released on December 18, 2001, by Ill Will and Columbia Records. In contrast to his previous work's gangsta rap themes, the album contains socially conscious and philosophical themes similar to that of his 1994 debut Illmatic. Nas' lyrics address topics such as ghetto life, American politics, and his feud with rapper Jay-Z.

Stillmatic was a commercial and critical success and helped re-establish Nas' career, following a period of critical disappointment with his previous album Nastradamus (released in 1999). It debuted at number 8 on the US Billboard 200 and sold over 342,600 in its first week of sales, eventually going on to sell over 2,026,000 copies in the United States. It has been certified Platinum by Recording Industry Association of America (RIAA).

== Background ==
Though he had gained critical acclaim with his classic debut album Illmatic in 1994, Nas' image had been quickly deteriorating in the hip-hop community with his change of theme, from the philosophical topics of Illmatic to the gangsta rap and commercialized sound that became the focus of his later albums. While his second album, It Was Written, received positive reviews and introduced him to a greater audience, the follow-ups I Am... and Nastradamus were considered mediocre in comparison by critics. The release of Stillmatic was an attempt by Nas to reestablish his credibility in the hip-hop community, with the title signifying his intentions to continue where Illmatic left off.

=== Feud with Jay-Z ===
Jay-Z had previously dissed Nas in his song "Takeover", taken from his September 2001 release, The Blueprint. On Stillmatic, Nas retaliated with the anticipated song, "Ether," a response to "Takeover" which insinuated that Jay-Z had stolen lyrics from The Notorious B.I.G. several times, that he had sold out, and that he was a misogynist, among other things. Several hip-hop aficionados believe Nas won the feud based on this track, which many felt was much more vicious and ruthless than "Takeover", although this is still a subject of debate within hip-hop circles. Jay-Z would respond with "People Talkin", "Don't You Know", "Blueprint 2" from The Blueprint 2: The Gift & the Curse and the radio freestyle "Supa Ugly."

== Singles ==
The first single from Stillmatic was "Rule" featuring R&B singer Amerie. It was not heavily promoted but still managed to reach number 67 on the Hot R&B/Hip-Hop Singles & Tracks chart. It did not receive a video and was issued on compact disc, so many are unaware that it was a single. "Got Ur Self a Gun" was believed to have been the first single from Stillmatic. "Got Ur Self a Gun", produced by Megahertz, contains a sample from the theme song to the HBO crime drama The Sopranos. The third single was "One Mic", which received acclaim for its content and video.

== Critical reception ==
Professional ratings
Aggregate scores
| Source | Rating |
|---|---|
| Metacritic | 69/100 |
Review scores
| Source | Rating |
| AllMusic | 3/5 stars |
| Blender | 3.5/5 stars |
| Los Angeles Times | 3.5/4 stars |
| NME | 7/10 |
| Pitchfork | 9.1/10 |
| Rolling Stone | 2.5/5 stars |
| The Source | 5/5 stars |
| Spin | 7/10 |
| USA Today | 3.5/4 stars |
| Vibe | 3.5/5 stars |

Stillmatic was met with generally positive reviews. At Metacritic, which assigns a normalized rating out of 100 to reviews from mainstream critics, the album received an average score of 69, based on 12 reviews.

The Source awarded the album a perfect "five-mic" rating, and Blender's Alex Pappademas praised it as "a surprising return to form". Reviewing for The Village Voice, Selwyn Seyfu Hinds said: "Stillmatic isn't merely a reunion or rehash of Illmatic themes. The Nas on this record has grown, with the emotional expansion such maturation suggests. For one, he has never before drawn upon his anger, with a burning focus and controlled intensity that underscores nearly every song. Some of it can surely be ascribed to the Jay-Z battle, but more seems due to the deeper, internal struggle Nas has waged against the fallout from his early, precocious success". Steve Jones of USA Today stated, "diss songs aside, Nas' strength has always been his incisive lyrical analyses of current events." John Bush from AllMusic said: "Dropping many of the mainstream hooks and featured performers in order to focus his rapping, Nas proves he's still a world-class rhymer, but he does sound out of touch in the process of defending his honor. Despite the many highlights, a few of the tracks just end up weighing him down". Elizabeth Mendez Berry of Vibe called it "infuriatingly inconsistent" but also "an exercise in lyrical courage and musical might".

Some reviewers were more critical. Rolling Stone magazine's Kathryn McGuire said: "Striving to maintain street cred while reaching for pop success has left Nas vacillating clumsily on past projects, and this record is riddled with similar inconsistencies. One moment he casts himself as a gritty cat who feels most at home on a project bench, calling out neighborhood snakes ('Destroy and Rebuild') and ducking gunshots ('One Mic'). The next, he's delivering dumbed-down verses over the Track Masters' rinky-dink rendition of Tears for Fears' 'Everybody Wants to Rule the World.'" In The Village Voice's "Consumer Guide", Robert Christgau found the release unworthy of a review and instead relegated it to a listing of ungraded "duds" in the column.

Retrospective appraisals have been relatively positive. In The New Rolling Stone Album Guide (2004), Chris Ryan wrote that Stillmatic "finds Nas sticking with what works, creative storyraps and trenchant social commentary. He still errs when he makes attempts at club tracks, but the album is largely a success." Writing in the Encyclopedia of Popular Music, Colin Larkin commended Nas for "rebuilding his creative and commercial standing" in the early 2000s with Stillmatic. In 2005, Chris Rock compiled a list of his Top 25 Hip-Hop Albums of all time, to which he ranked Stillmatic at number 20, commenting "It's like Mama Said Knock You Out eleven years earlier, where a guy just reclaimed his spot with some great records".

== Track listing ==
Stillmatic track listing
| No. | Title | Writer(s) | Producer(s) | Length |
|---|---|---|---|---|
| 1. | "Stillmatic (The Intro)" | Nasir Jones; Jeffrey Backues Neal | Hangmen 3 | 2:11 |
| 2. | "Ether" | Jones; Rondell Turner | Ron Browz | 4:37 |
| 3. | "Got Ur Self a Gun" | Jones; Jake Black; Dorsey Wesley | Megahertz | 3:48 |
| 4. | "Smokin'" | Jones | Nas; Precision | 3:47 |
| 5. | "You're da Man" | Jones; William Mitchell | Large Professor | 3:26 |
| 6. | "Rewind" | Jones; Rick Rubin; Mitchell | Large Professor | 2:13 |
| 7. | "One Mic" | Jones; Chucky Thompson | Nas; Chucky Thompson for The Hitmen | 4:28 |
| 8. | "2nd Childhood" | Jones; Christopher Martin; P. Miles Bryson | DJ Premier | 3:51 |
| 9. | "Destroy & Rebuild" | Jones; Lawrence Parker; Paul Hendricks; Michael Risko | Baby Paul; Mike Risko | 5:24 |
| 10. | "The Flyest" (featuring AZ) | Jones; Anthony Cruz; Leshan Lewis | L.E.S. | 4:38 |
| 11. | "Rule" (featuring Amerie) | Jones; Amerie Rogers; Samuel Barnes; Olivier; Chris Hughes; Roland Orzabal; Ian Stanley | Trackmasters | 4:32 |
| 12. | "My Country" (featuring Millennium Thug) | Jones; Nashawn Jones | Lofey | 5:12 |
| 13. | "What Goes Around" (featuring Keon Bryce) | Jones | Salaam Remi | 4:59 |
| 14. | "Every Ghetto (Bonus Track)" (featuring Blitz the Ambassador) | Jones; Lewis | L.E.S. | 3:28 |
| Total length: | | | | 56:34 |

Disc 2 (Limited Edition)
| No. | Title | Producer | Length |
|---|---|---|---|
| 1. | "No Idea's Original" | The Alchemist | 3:07 |
| 2. | "U Gotta Love It" (snippet) | L.E.S. | 1:33 |
| 3. | "My Way" (snippet) | The Alchemist | 1:36 |
| 4. | "Make It Last" (snippet) | L.E.S. | 1:57 |
| 5. | "Doo Rags" (snippet) | Precision | 1:22 |
| Total length: | | | 9:35 |

Notes

- "Got Ur Self a Gun" was later retitled "Got Ur Self A..." on the clean version of the album.
- The track "Braveheart Party", written by Nasir Jones and Jean-Claude Olivier and produced by Swizz Beatz, was removed from later pressings of Stillmatic at Mary J. Blige's request.
- The Japanese release of Stillmatic features three additional tracks: "No Idea's Original", "Everybody's Crazy" and "Black Zombies". Each can also be found on The Lost Tapes, a compilation album that was released in 2002.
- A limited-edition version of Stillmatic contains a bonus disc with snippets from five songs on The Lost Tapes.
- A sequel to "2nd Childhood" was released as "3rd Childhood" on Nas' and DJ Premier's 2025 album Light-Years.

Samples

- "Stillmatic (The Intro)" contains a sample from "Let Me Be Your Angel" by Stacy Lattisaw.
- "Ether" contains dialogue from "Fuck Friendz" by 2Pac, and gunshot samples from "Knuckleheadz" by Raekwon and "Who Shot Ya?" by The Notorious B.I.G.
- "Got Ur Self a Gun" contains a sample from "Woke Up This Morning" by Alabama 3.
- "You're Da Man" contains a sample from "Sugar Man" by Sixto Diaz Rodriguez (sometimes misattributed to DJ David Holmes), "Am Fenster" by the German band City, and "Theme from Exodus" by Pat Boone & Ernest Gold.
- "Rewind" contains a sample from "It's Yours" by T La Rock, "Monkey Island" by The J. Geils Band, and "I'm Not Rough" by The J. Geils Band.
- "One Mic" contains a sample from "In the Air Tonight" by Phil Collins, and "I'm Gonna Love You Just a Little More Baby" by Barry White.
- "2nd Childhood" contains a sample from "Born to Love" by Peabo Bryson & Roberta Flack, "Da Bridge 2001" by Nas & Ill Will Records Presents QB's Finest, and "N.Y. State of Mind Pt. II" by Nas.
- "Destroy & Rebuild" contains an interpolation from "The Bridge is Over" by Boogie Down Productions.
- "The Flyest" contains a sample from "Night Moves" by Frank McDonald and Chris Rae, and "Child of Tomorrow" by Badder Than Evil.
- "Rule" contains an interpolation from "Everybody Wants to Rule the World" by Tears for Fears.
- "Every Ghetto" contains a sample from "Main Title" (The Eiger Sanction) by John Williams.

== Personnel ==
- Pablo Arraya – assistant engineer
- AZ – performer
- Baby Paul – producer, instrumentation
- Mary J. Blige – performer
- Osie Bowe – engineer
- Ron Browz – producer
- Keon Bryce – vocals (background)
- Kevin Crouse – engineer, mixing
- Alex Dixon – assistant engineer
- DJ Premier – producer, mixing
- Chris Feldman – art direction, design
- Steve Fisher – assistant engineer
- Tameka Foster – stylist
- Chris Gehringer – mastering
- Bryan Golder – engineer
- Jason Goldstein – mixing
- Paul Gregory – assistant engineer
- Destiny Jones – executive producer
- Will Kennedy – imaging
- Large Professor – producer
- Nas – performer, producer
- Alex Ndione – assistant engineer
- David A. Belgrave – Marketing
- Jake Ninan – assistant engineer
- James Porte – engineer
- Ismel Ramos – assistant engineer
- Salaam Remi – organ, bass, guitar, percussion, drums, producer, Fender rhodes
- Mike "Wrekka" Risko – producer, musician
- Eddie Sancho – mixing
- Chucky Thompson – producer
- Sacha Waldman – photography

== Charts ==
=== Weekly charts ===
Weekly chart performance for Stillmatic
| Chart (2001–2002) | Peak position |
|---|---|
| Australian Albums (ARIA) | 54 |
| Canadian Albums (Nielsen SoundScan) | 28 |
| Canadian R&B Albums (Nielsen SoundScan) | 9 |
| Dutch Albums (Album Top 100) | 40 |
| French Albums (SNEP) | 124 |
| German Albums (Offizielle Top 100) | 64 |
| Japanese Albums (Oricon) | 95 |
| Swiss Albums (Schweizer Hitparade) | 56 |
| US Billboard 200 | 5 |
| US Top R&B/Hip-Hop Albums (Billboard) | 1 |

=== Year-end charts ===
Year-end chart performance for Stillmatic
| Chart (2002) | Position |
|---|---|
| Canadian R&B Albums (Nielsen SoundScan) | 37 |
| Canadian Rap Albums (Nielsen SoundScan) | 19 |
| US Billboard 200 | 31 |
| US Top R&B/Hip-Hop Albums (Billboard) | 5 |

== Certifications ==
Certifications for Stillmatic
| Region | Certification | Certified units/sales |
|---|---|---|
| Canada (Music Canada) | Gold | 50,000^{^} |
| United Kingdom (BPI) | Gold | 100,000^{*} |
| United States (RIAA) | Platinum | 1,000,000^{^} |
^{*} Sales figures based on certification alone.^{^} Shipments figures based on certification alone.

== Notes ==
- Brackett, Nathan; Hoard, Christian, eds. (2004). The New Rolling Stone Album Guide: Completely Revised and Updated 4th Edition. Simon and Schuster. ISBN 0-7432-0169-8.
