= Got Ur Self a Gun =

Single by Nas

from the album Stillmatic
- Released: December 4, 2001 (United States); 21 January 2002 (United Kingdom)
- Recorded: 2000
- Genre: East Coast hip-hop
- Length: 3:48
- Label: Ill Will, Columbia
- Songwriter(s): Nasir Jones; Alabama 3 Dorsey Wesley
- Producer(s): Megahertz

Nas singles chronology
"Rule" (2001)	"Got Ur Self a Gun" (2001)	"I'm Gonna Be Alright" (Track Masters Remix) (2002)

"Got Ur Self a Gun", also known as "Got Ur Self A..." for the clean versions of the album and single, is the second single from the 2001 album Stillmatic by the American rapper Nas. The song is produced by Megahertz and samples The Sopranos theme song "Woke Up This Morning", performed by Alabama 3. It reached #87 on the Billboard Hot 100.

== Music video ==
The music video features Nas in a church confessional. It pays respect to The Notorious B.I.G. and 2Pac by depicting the two rappers being shot. The photos transition to video, in which Nas is the actor.

== Single track listing ==
=== US 12" single ===
A-side

1. "Got Ur Self a Gun" (Explicit)
2. "Got Ur Self A...." (Clean)

B-side

1. "Got Ur Self a Gun" (Instrumental)
2. "You're da Man" (Explicit)

=== Europe 12" single ===
A-side

1. "Got Ur Self a Gun" (Explicit)
2. "Black Zombie" (Explicit)

B-side

1. "Ether" (Explicit)

== Charts ==
=== Weekly charts ===
Chart (2001–2002)	Peak position
Germany (GfK)	62
Netherlands (Single Top 100)	24
Switzerland (Schweizer Hitparade)	38
UK Singles (OCC)	30
US Billboard Hot 100	87
US Hot R&B/Hip-Hop Songs (Billboard)	37
US R&B/Hip-Hop Airplay (Billboard)	38
US Hot Rap Songs (Billboard)	2

=== Year-end charts ===
Chart (2002)	Position
US Hot R&B/Hip-Hop Songs (Billboard)	97

== In popular culture ==
A remixed version is featured in the final trailer for John Wick: Chapter 4.
