= Bruce Reynolds =

English criminal

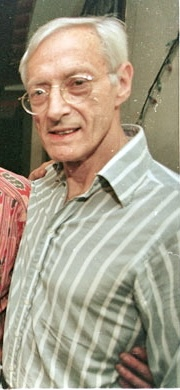
- Reynolds in 1999
- Born: Bruce Richard Reynolds; 7 September 1931; Strand, London, England
- Died: 28 February 2013 (aged 81); Croydon, Greater London, England
- Other names: Keith Clement Miller; Keith Hillier
- Occupations: Thief; messenger; cyclist; antiques dealer
- Spouse: Frances "Angela" Reynolds (m. 1948; died 2010)
- Children: Nick Reynolds
- Motive: Financial gain/enjoyment
- Convictions: 1957: Assault and robbery, 3½ years HMP Wandsworth; 1969: Great Train Robbery, 25 years HMP Durham; 1980: Drug dealing, 3 years HMP Maidstone

Bruce Richard Reynolds (7 September 1931 – 28 February 2013) was an English criminal who masterminded the 1963 Great Train Robbery. At the time it was Britain's largest robbery, netting £2,631,684, equivalent to £49.67 million in 2026. Reynolds spent five years on the run before being sentenced to 25 years' imprisonment in 1969. He was released in 1978. He also wrote three books and performed with the band Alabama 3, for whom his son, Nick, plays.

== Early life ==
Bruce Richard Reynolds was born at Charing Cross Hospital, in Charing Cross, central London, the only child of Thomas Richard and Dorothy Margaret (née Keen). He was initially brought up in Putney. His mother, a nurse, died in 1935 when he was aged four. His father, a trade-union activist at the Ford Dagenham assembly plant, married again, and the family moved to Gants Hill. Reynolds found it difficult to live with his father and stepmother, choosing often to stay with one or other of his grandmothers. During the London Blitz of the Second World War he was evacuated to Suffolk and then to Warwickshire.

On leaving school at 14½, Reynolds failed the eyesight test to join the Royal Navy, and decided he wanted to become a foreign correspondent, so he applied in person for a job at Northcliffe House. Employed first as a messenger boy, he then worked in the accounts department of the Daily Mail. By the age of 17 he had become bored with the routine and was working in the Bland/Sutton Institute of Pathology at Middlesex Hospital, before joining Claud Butler as a bicycle messenger and a member of their semi-professional racing team, where he first met criminals and began a life of crime.

== Criminal career ==
After undertaking some petty crime and spending time in HMP Wormwood Scrubs and Borstal for theft (from which he escaped and was eventually caught and sent to Reading Prison), he spent six weeks of the required two years doing National Service in the British Army, before absconding to return to petty crime. Sentenced to three years' imprisonment in 1952 for breaking and entering, he was sent to the juvenile wing of Wandsworth Prison. He then embarked on jewellery thefts from large country houses.

In 1957 Reynolds was arrested, together with Terry Hogan, for assault and robbery of £500 from a bookmaker returning from White City Greyhounds. The police stated their belief that the intent of the cosh attack was grievous bodily harm and not robbery. Hogan was sentenced to 2½ years and Reynolds to 3½ years imprisonment. After spending time in HMP Wandsworth and HMP Durham, on release in 1960 he then became an antiques dealer and thief.

He joined a gang with a future close friend Harry Booth and his future brother-in-law John Daly. Later on, he worked with Jimmy White and met Buster Edwards at Charlie Richardson's club. Richardson in turn introduced him to Gordon Goody. Reynolds gained the nickname Napoleon. In 1962, his gang stole £62,000 in a security van robbery at Heathrow Airport. They then attempted to rob a Royal Mail train at Swindon, which netted only £700. But Reynolds, now looking for his career-criminal defining moment, started planning his next train robbery over a period of three months.

Reynolds organised a gang of 15 men to undertake the 1963 Great Train Robbery (which he later referred to as his "Sistine Chapel ceiling"). After the robbery, Reynolds contacted underworld boss Joey Pyle, who fixed up several places for Reynolds to hide – his brother's house in Cobham, Pyle's own place in Clapham South until the end of August 1963, then a flat in Croydon above a dry-cleaners that Pyle jointly managed. He subsequently spent six months in a mews house in South Kensington waiting for a false passport. He then travelled via Elstree Airfield to Ostend, and was driven to Brussels Airport, before flying to Mexico City via Toronto. Assuming the name Keith Clement Miller, he was joined by his wife, Frances, who changed her name to Angela, and their son, Nick.

I was beginning to see the thief as an artist ... Nothing could match the tension, excitement and sense of fulfillment.

— Reynolds to The Daily Telegraph

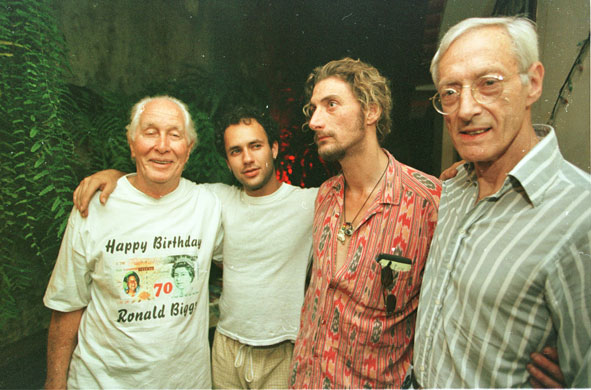
Reynolds (far right) at Ronnie Biggs' (far left) 70th birthday with their sons

For Christmas 1964, the family were joined in Acapulco by fellow train robbers Buster Edwards, who had not yet been caught, and treasurer Charlie Wilson, who had escaped from HMP Winson Green. Reynolds and his family later moved to Montreal, Quebec, Canada, where Wilson had settled with his family, but a proposed theft of Canadian dollars was stopped due to Royal Canadian Mounted Police observation. Reynolds then moved to Vancouver, before returning that summer to the South of France.

The family returned to London, then moved to Torquay, Devon. Assuming the name Keith Hiller, Reynolds began settling with his family into his childhood holiday town, before he had the urge to make contact with his old friends back in London. The Metropolitan Police realised that Hiller was Reynolds, and arrested him in Torquay on 9 November 1968. Offered a deal by the Director of Public Prosecutions to plead guilty and avoid their pursuing his son, wife and family on further criminal charges, Reynolds agreed to plead guilty and was sentenced to 25 years imprisonment. All of the Great Train robbers were held in maximum security in a specially built unit at HMP Durham. After making friends with both Charlie and Eddie Richardson whilst in prison, Reynolds was released from HMP Maidstone in 1978.

After a failed venture in the textile trade, he began trafficking and money laundering for many South London drug gangs. Arrested for dealing amphetamines, he was jailed in the 1980s for three years.

== Later life ==
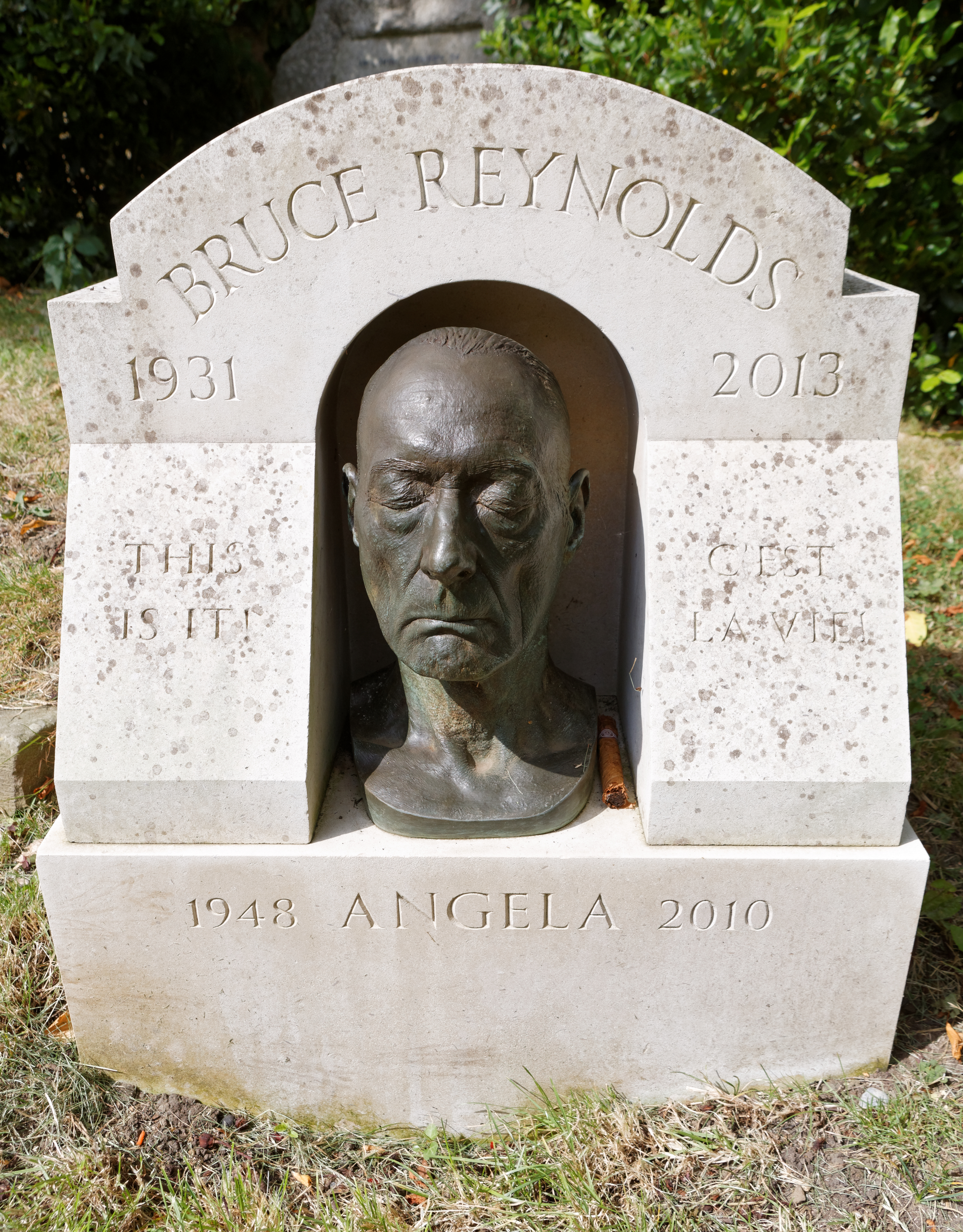
Reynolds's grave in Highgate Cemetery

On release he gained a profile in the media as a "former criminal" figure, and acted as a consultant on the film Buster, with Larry Lamb portraying Reynolds. Reynolds then published his autobiography The Autobiography of a Thief (1995). In the book, Reynolds commented on the curse that followed him around, as no one wanted to employ him either legally or illegally:

I became an old crook living on handouts from other old crooks.

Having either spent or had removed by courts the monies that he gained through crime, by the 1990s Reynolds was living on income support in a flat in Croydon, Greater London, supplied by a charitable trust. Reynolds's wife, Frances, died in 2010. He died in his sleep on the afternoon of 28 February 2013 at the age of 81. At the time of his death, Reynolds was working on The Great Train Robbery 50th Anniversary: 1963–2013, published by Mpress in July 2013.

== In popular culture ==
Multiple media properties and parodies have been produced about the Great Train Robbery [see Details of the Great Train Robbery and the robbers]. Examples featuring Bruce Reynolds include: Die Gentlemen bitten zur Kasse (The Gentleman Prefers Payment, also known as Great British Train Robbery) which aired on ARD in 1966 and featured Horst Tappert as Reynolds, Robbery (1967) with Stanley Baker as a character based upon Reynolds, and Buster (1988) with Larry Lamb as Reynolds.

In 2012, Reynolds was portrayed in the television series Mrs Biggs by Jay Simpson.

He was also the subject of the song "Have You Seen Bruce Richard Reynolds", originally by Nigel Denver and later covered by the UK band Alabama 3. Reynolds himself appears on the Alabama 3 version.

On the day that Biggs died, 18 December 2013, the BBC broadcast the first of a two-part series, The Great Train Robbery, a dramatisation of the events, first from the criminals' perspective and then from that of the police. The programme had already been scheduled for broadcast on that date. Bruce Reynolds was played by Welsh actor Luke Evans.
