= Rule (Nas song) =

Single by Nas featuring Amerie

from the album Like Mike: Music From the Motion Picture and Stillmatic
- B-side: "No Idea's Original"
- Released: October 6, 2001
- Genre: Hip hop; R&B
- Length: 4:32
- Label: Ill Will; Columbia
- Songwriters: Nasir Jones; Amerie Rogers; Samuel Barnes; Jean Claude Olivier; Chris Hughes; Roland Orzabal; Ian Stanley
- Producer: Trackmasters

Nas singles chronology
"Oochie Wally" (2001)	"Rule" (2001)	"Got Ur Self A..." (2001)

Amerie singles chronology
"Rule" (2001)	"Why Don't We Fall in Love" (2002)

"Rule" is the first single from American rapper Nas' 2001 album Stillmatic. It features a chorus sung by Amerie and production provided by Poke and Tone of Trackmasters Entertainment. The song is known for both sampling and interpolating "Everybody Wants to Rule the World" by Tears for Fears.

== Overview ==
The song's lyrics are political, reminiscent of those on Nas' 1996 single "If I Ruled the World (Imagine That)", as referenced in the beginning of the song:

Life, they wonder, can they take me under? Naw, never that.

This references the intro to "If I Ruled the World (Imagine That)":

Life, I wonder, will it take me under? I don't know.

As a single, "Rule" was not heavily promoted, but still reached #67 on the Hot R&B/Hip-Hop Singles & Tracks chart. "Got Ur Self a Gun" is mistakenly thought to be the first single on Stillmatic because "Rule" was not heavily promoted, did not receive music video treatment and was never released in compact disc format. It was released as a vinyl 12-inch single with "No Idea's Original" as its B-side.

It was featured in the 2003 film, Honey, it is also featured on the Like Mike soundtrack, but includes the edited version.

== Track listing ==
=== Side A ===
1. "Rule" (radio edit) – 3:57
2. "Rule" (instrumental) – 4:07
3. "Rule" (clean a capella) – 4:02

=== Side B ===
1. "No Idea's Original" (explicit) – 4:05
2. "Rule" (explicit edit) – 4:07

== Charts ==
Chart performance for "Rule"
Chart (2002)	Peak position
US Hot R&B/Hip-Hop Songs (Billboard)	67
