= La Peste (album) =

Studio album by Alabama 3
- Released: 16 October 2000
- Recorded: 1999
- Studio: Milo Studios, Hoxton, London; Orinoco Studios, London SE1; Steam Rooms, Isle of Wight; The Fuzzpit; Olympic Studios, Barnes, London
- Length: 51:59
- Label: One Little Indian; Columbia
- Producer: John "Segs" Jennings, Steve "Dub" Jones

Alabama 3 chronology
Exile on Coldharbour Lane (1997)	La Peste (2000)	Power in the Blood (2003)

Professional ratings
Review scores
Source	Rating
AllMusic	3/5 stars
The Encyclopedia of Popular Music	3/5 stars

La Peste is the second studio album by Alabama 3, released in 2000.

The album peaked at No. 80 on the UK Albums Chart.

== Critical reception ==
Record Collector called the album "a dreamy romp through cinematic mini-masterpieces including 'Sad Eyed Lady Of The Low Life', 'Mansion On The Hill' and 'The Thrills Are Gone'." Trouser Press called it "a disappointing disgrace of an album," writing "the new, gussied-up A3 (designed, perhaps, not to offend Sopranos fans) is merely overproduced and out of ideas." NME deemed it "deeply pointless, if hilarious" and an "almost monumental waste of time." The Independent judged it "infectiously intelligent," writing that the band still operates "fruitfully at the convergence of country, funk, gospel and drug culture."

== Track listing ==
1. "Too Sick to Pray" (Love, Love, Love, Empiricist) - 4:44
2. "Mansion on the Hill" (Love, Love, Love, Dope) - 3:00
3. "Sad Eyed Lady of the Lowlife" (Love, Love, Love, Love, The Spirit) - 4:43
4. "Walking in My Sleep" (Love, Love, Love, Love, Empiricist, The Spirit) - 6:09
5. "Wade into the Water" (Love, Love, Empiricist) - 5:15
6. "Hotel California" (Don Felder, Don Henley, Glenn Frey) - 5:34
7. "Cocaine (Killed My Community)" (Love, Love, Love, Dope) - 4:44
8. "The Thrills Have Gone" (Love, Empiricist, The Spirit, Paddy Hill) - 4:30
9. "2129" (Love, Love, Empiricist, Dope) - 4:24
10. "Strange" (Love, Love, Empiricist, The Spirit) - 5:27
11. "Sinking..." (Love, Love, Love, The Spirit) - 5:29
- Bonus track (limited UK release)
1. "Woke Up This Morning" (Chosen One mix) (Love, Love, Love, The Very Reverend Dr. D. Love) - 4:09

== Personnel ==
Alabama 3

- Larry Love (Rob Spragg) – lead vocals
- D Wayne Love (Jake Black) – vocals
- The Mountain of Love (Piers Marsh) – programming, harmonica, synthesiser
- Sir "Real" Love L.S.D.O.P.T. (Simon Edwards) – percussion
- Captain Empiricist (Mark Sams) – guitar
- L.B. Dope (Johnny Delafons) – drums
- The Spirit (Orlando Harrison) – keyboards
- John "Segs" Jennings – guitars, bass, backing vocals

with:

- Steve "Dub" Jones – additional programming, synthesizers
- Val Harrison – vocals on 2, 9, 10, 11
- Paddy Hill and Treat – vocals on "The Thrills Have Gone"
- The Street Angels Choir 2000 – backing vocals
- Steve Roberts – backing vocals on "Sad Eyed Lady of the Low Life", "Strange" and "Sinking..."
- Jenna Spencer – backing vocals on "Walking in My Sleep" and "Sinking..."
- Eileen Rose – vocals on "Wade Into the Water"
- Bobby Valentino – mandolin on "Wade Into the Water"
- Ben Chapman – DJ cuts on "Sad Eyed Lady of the Low Life", "Hotel California" and "Cocaine (Killed My Community)"
- Bernie Clarke – organ on "Hotel California", horn arrangement on "Sinking..."
- Ned Morant – triangle on "Hotel California"
- Lushlife – horns on "Sinking..."
- Delrig, JC, Ray Mascarenas – backing vocals on "Sinking..."
- Simon Limbrick – steel drums on "Sinking..."
- Mr. Shifta – vocals on "Woke Up This Morning"

Technical

- John Collyer, Steve "Dub" Jones - engineer
- Nigel Bennett - photography

== Charts ==
Chart performance for La Peste
Chart (2000)	Peak position
Scottish Albums (OCC)	72
UK Albums (OCC)	80
UK Independent Albums (OCC)	9
