= Revolver Soul =

Studio album by Alabama 3
- Released: 3 May 2010
- Studio: Jamm Studios, Brixton
- Genre: Acid house; alternative; blues
- Length: 47:04
- Label: Hostage Music
- Producer: Segs Steve; 'Dub' Jones; Larry Love

Alabama 3 chronology
Hits and Exit Wounds (2008)	Revolver Soul (2010)	There Will Be Peace in the Valley... When We Get the Keys to the Mansion on the Hill (2011)

Professional ratings
Review scores
Source	Rating
The Independent	link

Revolver Soul is the seventh studio album by the band Alabama 3. It is the first album by the band to be released through Hostage Music, after parting ways with One Little Indian Records. It was recorded at Jamm Studios, in Brixton.

== Track listing ==
1. "(Intro) Oh Christ" – 3:37
2. "Bad to the Bone" – 3:15
3. "She Blessed Me" – 3:38
4. "Jacqueline" – 3:13
5. "Fix It" – 4:32 featuring Shane MacGowan
6. "Bad Girl" – 4:15
7. "If I Had a Diamond Ring" – 0:36
8. "Hostage" – 3:48
9. "Keep Your Powder Dry" – 4:28
10. "Come Ye Believers" – 0:57
11. "Vietnamistan" – 4:43
12. "All God's Children" – 3:36
13. "Revolver Soul" – 5:46
14. "(Outro) Oh Christ" – 1:38

== Notes ==
The title is a reference to the Beatles albums Revolver and Rubber Soul. "Vietnamistan" contains samples of "Yankee Doodle Dandy" and "I-Feel-Like-I'm-Fixin'-to-Die-Rag" by Country Joe & the Fish.

== Charts ==
Chart performance for Revolver Soul
Chart (2010)	Peak position
Scottish Albums (OCC)	52
UK Albums (OCC)	66
UK Independent Albums (OCC)	4
