= M.O.R. (album) =

Studio album by Alabama 3
- Released: 2007
- Studio: Jamm Studios, London
- Genre: Acid house, alternative
- Length: 63:05
- Label: One Little Indian
- Producer: Nexus 7

Alabama 3 chronology
Outlaw (2005)	M.O.R. (2007)	Hits and Exit Wounds (2008)

Professional ratings
Review scores
Source	Rating
Rockfeedback	4/5 stars

M.O.R. is the official sixth studio album by Alabama 3. It was released on 9 September 2007.

== Track listing ==
All tracks composed by Alabama 3; except where noted.

1. "Check In" – 1:21
2. "Fly" – 3:48
  - featuring Devlin Love
3. "Lockdown" (Nick Reynolds) – 4:12
4. "Monday Don't Mean Anything" – 4:09
  - featuring Errol T
5. "Amos Moses" (Jerry Reed) – 4:51
6. "Are You a Souljah?" (Steve Finnerty) – 6:07
  - featuring Nam/Rev. B. Atwell
7. "The Klan" (Alan Grey, David Grey) – 5:11
  - featuring Brian Jackson/MC Pablo
8. "Hooked" - 4:43
9. "The Doghouse Chronicles" – 2:09
10. "The Middle of the Road" (Cameron Blackwood, Matthew Racher) – 3:32
11. "Work It (All Night Long)" – 3:22
  - featuring The Lenin of Love
12. "Way Beyond the Blues" – 4:18
13. "Holy Blood" – 5:18
  - featuring The Kings of Kaos
14. "Sweet Joy" (Charlie Reid, Craig Reid) – 10:04
  - featuring The Proclaimers/Michael Wojas

== Charts ==
Chart performance for M.O.R.
Chart (2007)	Peak position
Irish Albums (IRMA)	45
Scottish Albums (OCC)	63
UK Albums (OCC)	88
UK Independent Albums (OCC)	7
