= There Will Be Peace in the Valley... When We Get the Keys to the Mansion on the Hill =

Studio album by Alabama 3
- Released: 24 February 2011
- Recorded: Jamm Studios, Brixton
- Genre: Blues
- Length: 42 Mins. Approx.
- Label: Hostage Music Ltd.
- Producer: Larry Love, Mark Wallis

Alabama 3 chronology
Revolver Soul (2010)	There Will Be Peace in the Valley... When We Get the Keys to the Mansion on the Hill (2011)	Shoplifting 4 Jesus (2011)

There Will Be Peace... is the eighth studio album by the British acid-house band, Alabama 3. It was released on 24 February 2011 through Hostage Music Ltd. The album is made up of entirely acoustic tracks, and is the first release from the band to not feature founding member and recurring vocalist, D.Wayne Love; however he featured on the full-band follow-up, Shoplifting 4 Jesus, released the same year. Alabama 3 embarked on a purely acoustic tour of the UK in 2010, and due to popular demand, created the album.

== Recording ==
There Will Be Peace... was recorded at Jamm Studios, Brixton (261 Brixton Road, London) in late 2010. The album was released through the band's current label, Hostage Music Ltd. It was the first album the band released via Hostage. A cover version of Joy Division's 'Love Will Tear Us Apart' is featured on the album, as well as a reference to the 1944 war film, Wing and a Prayer. The album artwork was painted by Danny Markey, an established artist. The paintings themselves however were not designed specifically for the album; they were taken from the Redfern Gallery in London. Also, a short story/poem was written by Howard Marks which featured on the inside-cover of the album. It is not specified what the title of the story is, but some fans believe it to be called 'Wholly Unholy', as this is the only highlighted text in the entire story.

== Reception ==
NME magazine called it a "monumental waste of time".

== Track listing ==
1. "Intro"
2. "Love Will Tear Us Apart" – 3:36
3. "Mule Skinner Blues" – 4:38
4. "The Operator" – 4:44
5. "Horse" – 3:25
6. "The Ballad of Mr. Daniels" – 2:40
7. "Miss Martel" – 3:22
8. "Sugar Man's Blues" – 2:44
9. "Rush" – 3:24
10. "Barricade (1789 - 1968 - 2011)" – 4:02
11. "A Wing & a Prayer" – 3:30
12. "That's the Way Love Is" – 4:04
- A 13th track can be found at the end of track 12, titled as simply "Hidden Track" (0:38)
- Track 2 is a cover of the Joy Division song of the same name.
- All songs written by Alabama 3, except Track 2; written by Joy Division.

== Personnel ==
- Rock Freebase – guitar
- Nick Reynolds – guitar
- Devlin Love – vocals, harmonica
- Gill Morley – Echo strings
- Ellen Blair – Echo strings
- Larry Love – vocals
- Aurora Dawn – vocals
- Eliza J – vocals
- Taf Thomas – vocals
- Mixed by Mark Wallis
- Produced by Mark Wallis and Larry Love
- Engineered by Tony Thomas and Mark Wallis
