= Nick Reynolds (sculptor) =

British sculptor and musician

Nick Reynolds is a British sculptor and musician, best known for his creation of death masks. He is the son of Bruce Reynolds, the mastermind of the Great Train Robbery. Reynolds and his work were the subject of radio programme Death Masks: The Undying Face broadcast by the BBC in September 2017.

Reynolds also plays harmonica in Alabama 3, the London-based group that, before Reynolds joined the group, created the song used as The Sopranos' theme song.
