= Outlaw (Alabama 3 album) =

Studio album by Alabama 3
- Released: 2005
- Studio: The Steam Rooms, London E14; Atomic Studios, Peckham, London; Good Luck Studios, South London
- Genre: Acid house; alternative
- Length: 49:15
- Label: One Little Indian
- Producer: Mark Wallis; Dave Ruffy

Alabama 3 chronology
The Last Train to Mashville Vol. 2 (2004)	Outlaw (2005)	M.O.R. (2007)

Professional ratings
Review scores
Source	Rating
The Guardian	link

Outlaw is the fifth studio album by British band Alabama 3, released in 2005.

== Track listing ==
1. "Intro" – 0:53
2. "Last Train to Mashville" – 4:11
3. "Terra Firma Cowboy Blues" – 3:29
4. "Keep Your Shades On" – 4:46
5. "Hello... I'm Johnny Cash" – 4:00
6. "Up Above My Head" – 3:57
7. "Adrenaline" – 4:24
  - featuring MC Tunes
8. "Have You Seen Bruce Richard Reynolds?" – 4:43
  - featuring Bruce Reynolds
9. "Honey in the Rock" – 4:08
  - featuring Devlin Love
10. "How Can I Protect You" – 4:09
  - featuring Aslan
11. "Let It Slide" – 5:13
12. "The Gospel Train" – 5:20

== Charts ==
Chart performance for Outlaw
Chart (2005)	Peak position
Scottish Albums (OCC)	40
UK Albums (OCC)	83
UK Independent Albums (OCC)	14
