= 24 Hour Church of Elvis =

Museum exhibit in Portland, Oregon, US

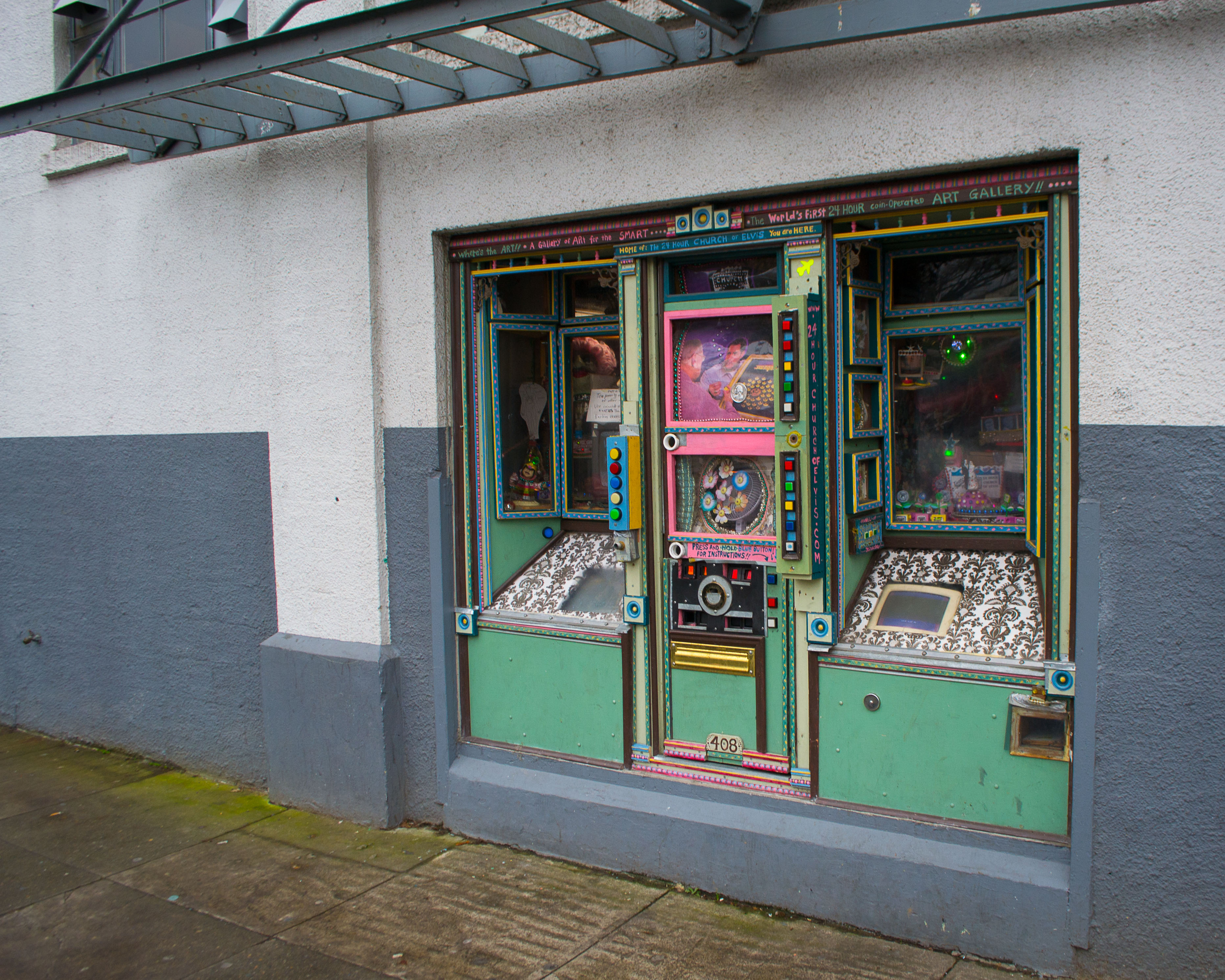
- Fourth exhibit location at 408 NW Couch Street, Portland
- Location: Portland, Oregon

The 24 Hour Church of Elvis was an exhibit at a museum and gallery called "Where's The ART!!" in Portland, Oregon, United States, run by artist Stephanie "Stevie" G. Pierce.

== History ==
The original location (1109 SW Washington), which operated from 1985 to 1986, had a changing variety of single coin-operated art installations accessible from the street, as elaborate window displays, and a large uncurated art gallery where any and all could sell their art available for purchase inside. It also had other installations by Pierce besides the coin operated art window installations, such as the artitorium, the hall of art horrors and "sex or money" (a parody of a catholic confessional booth). Fundraisers were called "art parties," with bands and artists and kegs of beer, a precursor to Pierce's cable access show, also called Where's the ART!! (1986–1990), that featured anyone who wanted to be on, in a live unscripted format, with Portland's own "Elvis" (see below) as sidekick, and Pierce as director producer and talent host impresario, with a generally rebellious crew of fellow artists and sound producers ever at the ready to interfere with Pierce's or the visiting artists' and band members' personal vision, making for a wild romp of weatherscreen inspired cg chaos that was surprisingly often a lot of fun to watch.

At the second location (219 SW Ankeny, 1987–1994, 45.522548°N 122.672416°W), the entire store front was again a work of art, and included several custom-built coin-operated automated art exhibits by Pierce that moved and made sounds in response to pressing buttons, featuring weddings, a "church experience" (hence the popular name 24 Hour Church of Elvis), or a visit to Dr. Justin D. Nikov-Time, the World's Cheapest psychic, for example. It would dispense (or not) various trinkets, pamphlets, fortunes, etc. for prices ranging from 25 cents to a dollar, mostly hand made by Pierce. The machines were run by Commodore 64 computers, and included crude graphics and speech synthesis. These machines were always accessible, hence the first part of the name. Other items by the artist were available inside the store when it was open. Also inside, one would often find the street performer called "Elvis" who would play a few songs on a cardboard guitar, in his sequined jumpsuit and thick, dark-rimmed glasses. This performer is still a regular fixture at Portland Saturday Market.

The third location (720 SW Ankeny, 1994–2002, 45.522593°N 122.678061°W) was devoted primarily towards 1970s popular culture memorabilia. By necessity, Pierce offered a personal tour, from room to room, describing her grand vision for re-establishing some of the exhibits from the original location on Washington St. At the end of the tour, Pierce would try (often desperately) to sell t-shirts. It was on the second floor and lacked any of the coin-operated machines of the older locations, although several cut-out holes in the first floor of the building hinted that they were intended to be installed at this location, but never were. The museum offered legal weddings for $25 and "cheap, not legal" weddings for $5. The fake weddings could be same sex. Despite the name, the third incarnation of the 24 Hour Church was not open 24 hours, as indicated by a sign on the door which read "24 Hour Church of Elvis: Usually open Noon to 5, 8 – 11 a lot. Call (503) 226-3671 for reassurance".

The fourth location (2008–2013 408 N.W. Couch St. 45.52384°N 122.674769°W) (pictured above) was conceived by Pierce to look like an artistic bank machine. She designed it and built it and wired it and programmed it for coin operation completely by herself. By that time, newer programming possibilities like wifi interference had surpassed her knowledge of electronics and it was next to impossible after a while to keep even simple momentary contact pushbuttons working. The storefront closed and was dismantled in March 2013 due to lack of funds for rent.

== See also ==
- Church of Tom Jones
- Culture of Portland, Oregon
