= Alabama 3 =

British band

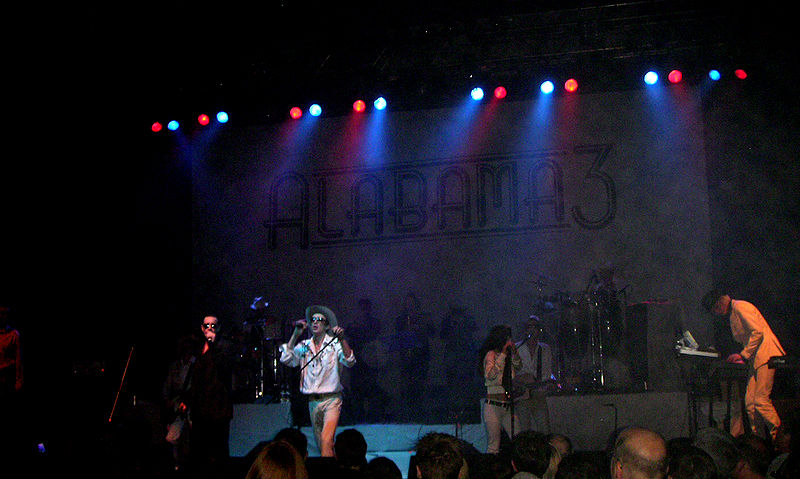
- Alabama 3, or A3, playing live at the London Astoria on 7 October 2007

Background information
- Also known as: The First Presleyterian Church of Elvis the Divine (UK); A3 (US)
- Origin: Brixton, London, England
- Genres: Blues rock; alternative dance; acid house; trip hop
- Years active: 1995–present
- Labels: Hostage Music; One Little Indian; Geffen/MCA Records; Columbia/Sony Music
- Members: Rob Spragg; Steve Finnerty; Zoe Devlin; Orlando Harrison; Mark Sams; Nick Reynolds; Be Atwell; Jonny Delafonz
- Past members: Jake Black; Simon Edwards; Piers Marsh; Aurora Dawn; John "Segs" Jennings; Robert "Hacker" Jessett; Rob Bailey
- Website: alabama3.co.uk

Alabama 3 is a British musical group founded in Brixton, London, in 1995. Their track "Woke Up This Morning" was used for the opening credits of the TV series The Sopranos. In the United States, the band is known as A3, to avoid legal conflict with the country music band Alabama.

== History ==
The band formed when Jake Black (born in Basildon, Essex; 27 April 1960 – 21 May 2019) met Rob Spragg (from Merthyr Tydfil, Wales) at a rave in Peckham. They decided that a fusion of country music with acid house was a musical possibility. Other members of the band were added later: Nick Reynolds is the son of one of the Great Train Robbers; Rob Spragg was at university with Piers Marsh, the harmonica-player and synthesiser programmer for the band; while Orlando Harrison, the group's keyboardist, used to live with Jake Black.

Forming initially under the name the First Presleyterian Church of Elvis the Divine (UK), and having been dismissed by the mainstream media as a novelty act, the group switched names to Alabama 3. As with their performances under the previous name, their sound fuses electronic pop with elements of country and blues styles. They signed with One Little Indian Records in 1997 for the release of their debut album, Exile on Coldharbour Lane. Every member of the group has an alias, the band's founding members adopting the personas Larry Love (Rob Spragg) and The Very Reverend Dr. D. Wayne Love (Jake Black). Their second album, La Peste, featured bassist John "Segs" Jennings of the Ruts under the stage name Frank Zappatista.

In August 2007, the group toured under the name of Alabama 3: Acoustic and Unplugged, with Harpo Strangelove and Devlin Love, to promote new album M.O.R.. Bassist John "Segs" Jennings left the band, saying he was "busy elsewhere and [he doesn't] have the time". M.O.R. included a cover of Jerry Reed's 1970s hit "Amos Moses", and features The Proclaimers on the track "Sweet Joy". Having recorded and toured with the band in the early days, Aurora Dawn rejoined the band in 2009. Between late 2010 and early 2011, programmer, harmonicist and founding member Piers Marsh left the band.

Jake Black, a founding band member and songwriter, died of Addison's disease on 21 May 2019, several days after falling ill during a show at Highest Point Festival in Lancashire. He was 59.

=== Mountain of Love ===
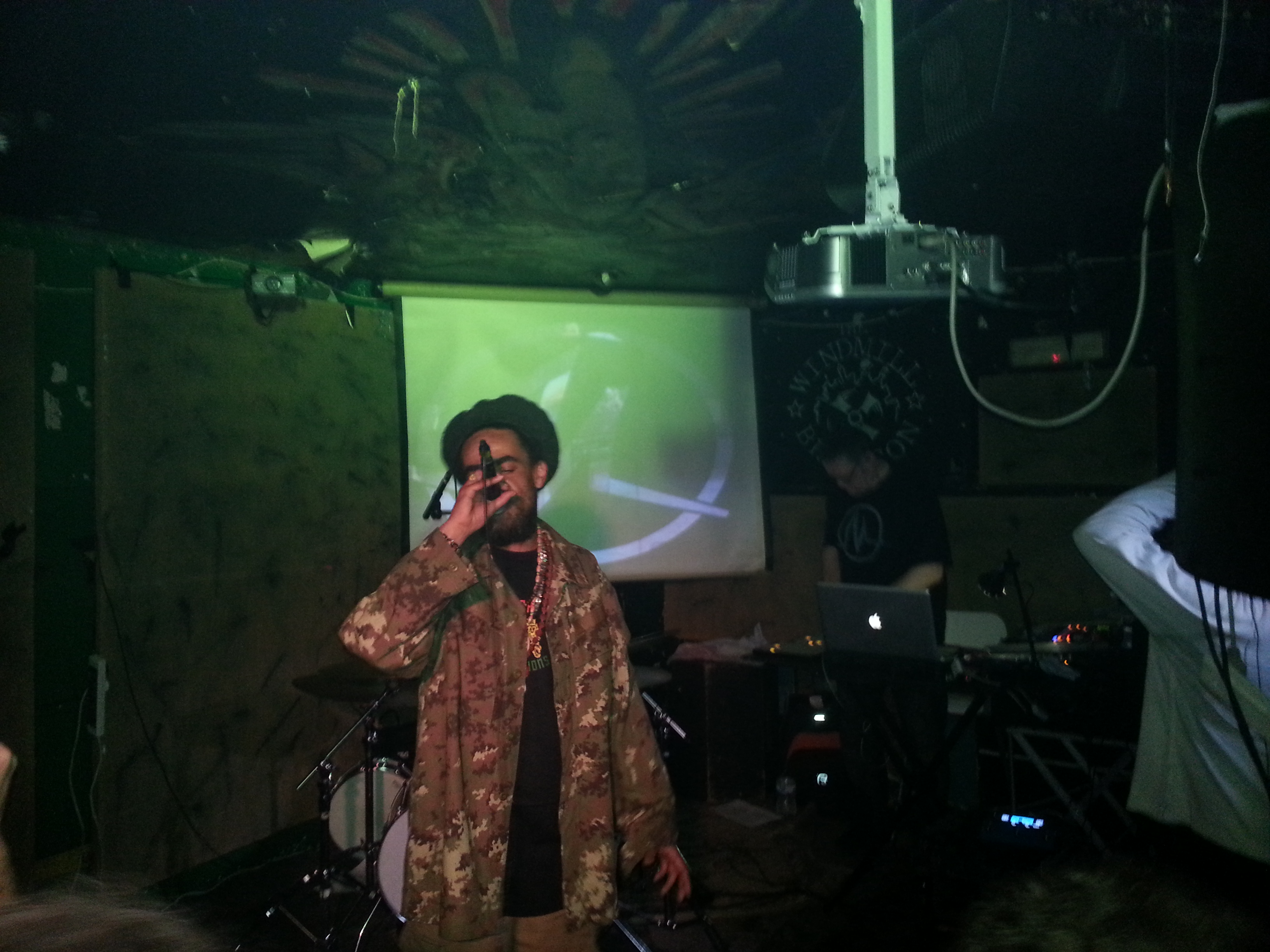
Mountain of Love

Mountain of Love is a dubtronica group formed by two of the original three members of Alabama 3, Piers Marsh and Sir Eddie Real, in 2011 in Brixton, London. The band's eponymous first album was released in 2013 on Cooked Griffin Records.

== Style ==
Alabama 3's sound is a blend of country, blues, and acid house. The band's songs have sampled Jim Jones in "Mao Tse Tung Said" and Birmingham Six survivor Patrick Hill in "The Thrills Have Gone". Trouser Press reviewer Jason Reeher wrote that A3's "debut is brilliant and shambolic...owing huge debts to both Hank Williams and Happy Mondays".

== Members ==
=== Current ===
In 2019 the band included:

- Rob Spragg a.k.a. Larry Love – vocals
- Orlando Harrison a.k.a. The Spirit – keyboards, keyboard bass, backing vocals
- Mark Sams a.k.a. Rock Freebase – guitar, bass guitar
- Steve Finnerty a.k.a. LOVEPIPE – production, guitar and vocals
- Jonny Delafons a.k.a. L. B. Dope – drums, percussion
- Greg Fleming a.k.a. Wizard – sequencer and effects
- Ese Okorodudu a.k.a. Sister Ese – guitar, vocals
- Sheena Ross a.k.a. Sister Sheena – vocals
- Be Atwell The Reverend Be Atwell – vocals
- Nick Reynolds a.k.a. Harpo Strangelove – harmonica, percussion, vocals

=== Former ===
- Jake Black a.k.a. The Very Reverend D.Wayne Love – vocals (d. 2019)
- Aurora Dawn – vocals
- Brian O'Horain, "Paddy Love" – vocals
- John Jennings a.k.a. Segs – backing vocals, bass guitar
- Zoe Devlin a.k.a. Devlin Love – vocals
- Simon (The Dude) Edwards a.k.a. Sir Eddie Real – percussion, vocals
- Piers Marsh a.k.a. The Mountain of Love – synths, programming, harmonica
- Marianna Little Eye Ty – dancer
- Laura Lady Love dancer – dancer
- Robert "Hacker" Jessett : a.k.a. El Comandante – harmonica, guitar, backing vocals
- Rob Bailey – guitar

== In popular culture ==
The band's music has been featured in numerous films, TV shows and video games, along with being sampled by other musicians, most famously through The Sopranos.

=== Film ===
- "Peace in the Valley" is featured in the film A Life Less Ordinary.
- "Too Sick to Pray" plays on the radio in the film Gone in 60 Seconds.
- A snippet of "Speed of the Sound of Loneliness" appears in Some Voices.
- "Mansion on the Hill" featured in 3000 Miles to Graceland.
- A part of "M.I.A" played in The Football Factory.
- The song "Sister Rosetta" from Exile on Coldharbour Lane can be heard in Barnyard.
- A snippet of "Bulletproof" appears in A Very British Gangster (2007), Donal MacIntyre's documentary film about Manchester crime boss Dominic Noonan.
- The song "Ain't Goin' to Goa" is featured in Definitely, Maybe.
- The band is featured in the documentary We Dreamed America. The film, which explores the influence of American country music on British artists, features three songs by the band.
- "Mansion on the Hill" is used in the opening credits of mockumentary Good Arrows, written by Irvine Welsh and Dean Cavanagh. It also appears in The House.

=== Television ===
- Lillyhammer – visit to NYC
- Episode four of the BBC Three series Being Human features "Too Sick to Pray" at its opening and "Sad Eyed Lady of the Lowlife" at its end. The songs were omitted from the DVD release of the episode due to copyright issues.
- "Mansion on the Hill" features in the sixth episode of the ABC television series Carpoolers.
- A remixed version of "Woke Up This Morning" plays during the opening credits of the HBO television series The Sopranos.
- A shortened, alternate version of "Woke Up This Morning" appears in The Simpsons episode "Poppa's Got a Brand New Badge", in a parody of the opening sequence of The Sopranos. It also appears in the later episode "The Mook, the Chef, the Wife and Her Homer", which guest-starred Sopranos regulars Michael Imperioli and Joe Pantoliano.
- On the Region 4 DVD release of season one of The Sopranos, the music video to "Woke Up This Morning" is included as a special feature; it is incorrectly credited as being performed by "Alabama 5".
- A snippet of "Sad Eyed Lady of the Lowlife" can be heard at the beginning of The Sopranos: "Mr. Ruggerio's Neighborhood" (episode 3.1) as Tony Soprano walks down the driveway to get his morning newspaper.
- "Woke Up This Morning" was also used in an episode of BBC series Top Gear, in which the team were driving through Alabama.
- The closing scene to first season Criminal Minds episode titled "Won't Get Fooled Again" (10/05/05) plays "The Night We Nearly Got Busted".
- "Mao Tse Tung Said" features in the first episode of the second season of Torchwood:.
- Rob Spragg (as Rob Love) wrote and recorded the theme to Welsh TV series Y Pris. He and John Hardy won the Best Original Music Soundtrack award at BAFTA Cymru 2008.
- Member Be Atwell appeared on the 2021 series of Come Dine With Me, scoring 25 out of 40, coming joint last.

=== Video Games ===
- "The Night We Nearly Got Busted" is featured on the soundtrack of the MMO game, All Points Bulletin.

=== Samples by other artists ===
- Rapper Nas sampled "Woke Up This Morning" for his 2001 hit "Got Ur Self A...".

== Discography ==
- Exile on Coldharbour Lane (1997)
- La Peste (2000)
- Power in the Blood (2002)
- Last Train to Mashville, Volume 2 (2002)
- Outlaw (2005)
- M.O.R. (2007)
- Revolver Soul (2010)
- There Will Be Peace in the Valley... When We Get the Keys to the Mansion on the Hill (2011)
- Shoplifting 4 Jesus (2011)
- The Men from W.O.M.B.L.E. (2013)
- The Wimmin from W.O.M.B.L.E. (2014)
- Blues (2016)
- Step 13 (2021)
- Cold War Classics Vol. 2 (2023)

== See also ==
- 24 Hour Church of Elvis
