= Power in the Blood (Alabama 3 album) =

Studio album by Alabama 3
- Released: 28 October 2002
- Length: 56:08
- Label: One Little Indian
- Producer: Alexis Worrall, John "Segs" Jennings, Larry Love, Rock Freebase, The Spirit

Alabama 3 chronology
La Peste (2000)	Power in the Blood (2002)	The Last Train to Mashville vol. 2 (2003)

Professional ratings
Review scores
Source	Rating
Robert Christgau	(3-star Honorable Mention)

Power in the Blood is the third studio album by Alabama 3.

== Track listing ==
All tracks composed by Alabama 3; except where indicated

1. "Two Heads" - 1:07
2. "Power in the Blood" - 4:46
3. "Reachin'" - 4:09
4. "Woody Guthrie" - 4:17
5. "Year Zero" - 4:23
6. "The Devil Went Down to Ibiza" - 2:51
7. "Strobe Life" - 6:12
8. "R.E.H.A.B." - 3:52
9. "The Moon has Lost the Sun" - 3:47
10. "Let the Caged Bird Sing"- 2:34
11. "Yellow Rose" - 4:55
12. "Bullet Proof" - 3:55
13. "Badlands" (Bruce Springsteen) - 0:47
14. "Lord Have Mercy" - 6:13
15. "Come on Home"- 1:20

== Bonus disc ==
The first 10,000 pressings of Power in the Blood include a bonus disc of six acoustic tracks, known as Acoustic Power.

1. "Woke Up This Morning" - 4:05
2. "Power in the Blood" - 2:31
3. "Disneyland Is Burning" - 3:00
4. "U Don't Danse 2 Tekno Anymore" - 3:46
5. "Year Zero" - 4:15
6. "Mansion on the Hill" - 3:06

== Personnel ==
Alabama 3

- Larry Love (Rob Spragg) – vocals
- The Very Rev. D.Wayne Love (Jake Black) – vocals
- Rock Freebase (Mark Sams) – guitars
- The Mountain of Love (Piers Marsh) – harp, programmes, vocals
- L.B. Dope (Johnny Delafons) – drums, programming
- Sir "Eddie" Real (Simon Edwards) – percussion
- The Spirit (Orlando Harrison) – keyboards
- Frank Zappatista (John "Segs" Jennings) – bass, vocals

Additional musicians

- Val Harrison – vocals on "Reachin'"
- Nick Tosches – vocals on "R.E.H.A.B."
- Hubert Selby, Jr. – vocals on "The Moon has Lost the Sun"
- Lisa Delatour Billson – vocals on "Year Zero", backing vocals on "Power in the Blood"
- Val Harrison – vocals on "Reachin'"
- Be Atwell and Siobhan Parr – vocals on "Bullet Proof"
- Michael Groce – vocals on "Lord Have Mercy"

== Cover version ==
"Power in the Blood" was later recorded by United States singer Buffy Sainte-Marie as the title track of her 2015 album. The album won the 2015 Polaris Music Prize on September 21, 2015. The award was later revoked.

== Charts ==
Chart performance for Power in the Blood
Chart (2002)	Peak position
Scottish Albums (OCC)	70
UK Albums (OCC)	88
UK Independent Albums (OCC)	14
