= Woke Up This Morning =

Single by Alabama 3

from the album Exile on Coldharbour Lane
- Released: June 1997
- Recorded: 1997
- Genre: Alternative dance; trip hop; acid house; acid jazz; blues rock; gospel
- Length: 5:18 (album version); 4:05 (Chosen One Mix)
- Label: Geffen; Elemental
- Songwriters: Jake Black; Rob Spragg
- Producer: Alabama 3

Alabama 3 singles chronology
"Ain't Going to Goa" (1996)	"Woke Up This Morning" (1997)	"Speed of the Sound of Loneliness" (1997)

"Woke Up This Morning" is a song by British band Alabama 3 from their 1997 album Exile on Coldharbour Lane. The song is best known as the opening theme music for the American television series The Sopranos, which used a shortened version of the "Chosen One Mix" of the song.

== Background and writing ==
Described as "a propulsive hip-hop song complete with Howlin' Wolf samples and a swelling gospel choir", it has also been called a "great theme song", which "generates anticipation, immediately puts the viewer in a focused frame of mind, and creates the kind of sonic familiarity that breeds audience loyalty." Alabama 3 frontman Rob Spragg wrote the song after hearing about the 1996 Sara Thornton murder case, who stabbed her husband after claiming to be the victim of two years of his abuse, mistreatment and neglect. The song is co-written with Piers Marsh, Simon Edwards, and Jake Black.

"We started with a Howlin' Wolf loop, but a lot of blues lyrics are quite misogynist[ic]," Spragg explained. "So I turned it round to be about a woman who's had enough and gets a gun – it's quite ironic that it's become a New Jersey gangster anthem." The track contains elements of "Tell Me" performed by Howlin' Wolf, a sample from "Standing at the Burying Ground" by Mississippi Fred McDowell and a sample from "Mannish Boy" by Muddy Waters.

The cover art for the single is in the style of the cover art of Crosby, Stills, Nash & Young's 1970 album Déja Vu.

== Use in other media ==
In film

- The song is used in the film The House (2017).
- The edited version of "Woke Up This Morning", used between the two remixes of "Detroit Mix" and "Chosen One Mix", with the latter was known that was used for The Sopranos plays over the end credits of the prequel film The Many Saints of Newark.

In television

- A remixed version of "Woke Up This Morning" plays during an episode of MTV's music documentary series BIOrhythm for Tommy Lee.
- The remixed version "Woke Up This Morning (Chosen One Mix)" was used for the opening credits of the HBO television series The Sopranos. Spragg later quipped, "Since it's been on The Sopranos, we've met some nice men in Armani suits with fat hands and eaten some nice Italian food. But we're very happy to be associated with a programme of that calibre. While in no way endorsing the use of guns in any fetishistic manner, obviously."
  - In The Sopranos episode "Boca", "Woke Up This Morning (Urban Takeover Mix)" can be heard in a tense scene as Tony Soprano ponders retaliation against his daughter's soccer coach for sexually abusing an underage player.
  - On the Region 4 DVD release of the show's first season, the music video for "Woke Up This Morning" is included as a special feature but is incorrectly credited to "Alabama 5".
  - A shortened alternate version of "Woke Up This Morning" can be heard in The Simpsons episode "Poppa's Got a Brand New Badge", while Fat Tony and his gang are on a ride to the Simpsons' house; the sequence is a parody of the opening sequence of The Sopranos.
  - "Woke Up This Morning" is also heard in a later Simpsons episode "The Mook, the Chef, the Wife and Her Homer", which guest-starred Sopranos stars Michael Imperioli and Joe Pantoliano.
  - "Woke Up This Morning" was used in the Lilyhammer episode "Ghosts", in which Frank Tagliano (Steven Van Zandt) and his Norwegian crew are driving through New York City; Van Zandt's breakthrough role as an actor was Silvio Dante in The Sopranos.
  - Woke Up This Morning" was used in the fourth episode of She-Hulk: Attorney at Law when inexperienced magician Donny Blaze inadvertently transports a volunteer to Wong's home in Nepal while he's watching The Sopranos.
- "Woke Up This Morning" was used in an episode of the BBC series Top Gear, in which the trio was driving through Florida in cheap old American cars.

In sport

- An edited version of the remix "Woke Up This Morning (Chosen One Mix)" was used as an official song for the 2024 CONCACAF W Gold Cup women's soccer tournament.

== Charts ==
1997 chart performance for "Woke Up This Morning"
Chart (1997)	Peak position
Scottish Singles Sales (Official Charts)	79
UK Singles (Official Charts)	78

2000 chart performance for "Woke Up This Morning"
Chart (2000)	Peak position
Ireland (IRMA)	41
Scottish Singles Sales (Official Charts)	60
UK Singles (Official Charts)	79
