= Cottesloe Hundred =

Hundred in Buckinghamshire

Coordinates: 51.8653°N 0.5872°W

- Area
  - 1851: 70,922 acres (287.01 km^{2})
- Population
  - 1861: 20,681
- History
  - Created: 11th century
  - Abolished: 1880s
- Status: Hundred
  - HQ: Edlesborough
- Subdivisions
  - Type: Parishes

Cottesloe Hundred was a hundred in the county of Buckinghamshire, England. It extended from close to the north of the county and Northamptonshire south-east to the Hertfordshire boundary at Berkhampsted.

== History ==
Until at least the time of the Domesday Survey in 1086 there were 18 hundreds in Buckinghamshire. It has been suggested however that neighbouring hundreds had already become more closely associated in the 11th century so that by the end of the 14th century the original or ancient hundreds had been consolidated into 8 larger hundreds. Cottesloe became the name of the hundred formed from bringing together the three hundreds of Cottesloe, Mursley and Yardley under a bailiff as early as 1255. These original hundred names still persisted in official records until at least the early part of the 17th century. As late as 1730, there are records referring to the "Cottesloe three-hundreds", reflecting the earlier history. The court leet for Cottesloe hundred was usually held twice a year at Edlesborough.

== Parishes and hamlets ==
Cotteslow hundred comprised the following ancient parishes and hamlets, (formerly medieval vills), allocated to their respective 11th century hundred:

Cottesloe	Mursley	Yardley
Aston Abbots	Drayton Parslow	Cheddington
Creslow	Dunton	Cholesbury
Cublington	Hoggeston	Drayton Beauchamp
Grove	Great Horwood (with Singleborough)	Edlesborough (with Dagnall, Hadnall and Northall)
Hardwick (with Weedon)	Little Horwood	Hawridge
Linslade	Mursley (with Salden)	Ivinghoe (with Ivinghoe Aston, Horton, Seabrook and St Margarets)
Mentmore (with Ledburn)	Soulbury	Marsworth
Whitchurch	Stewkley	Pitstone (with Nettleden and Friesden)
Wing	Swanbourne	Slapton
Wingrave (with Rowsham)	Shenley (part of)
	Tattenhoe
	Whaddon (with Nash)
	Winslow

== See also ==
- List of hundreds of England and Wales
