= Grove, Buckinghamshire =

Village in Buckinghamshire, England

Coordinates: 51.893°N 0.665°W

Grove
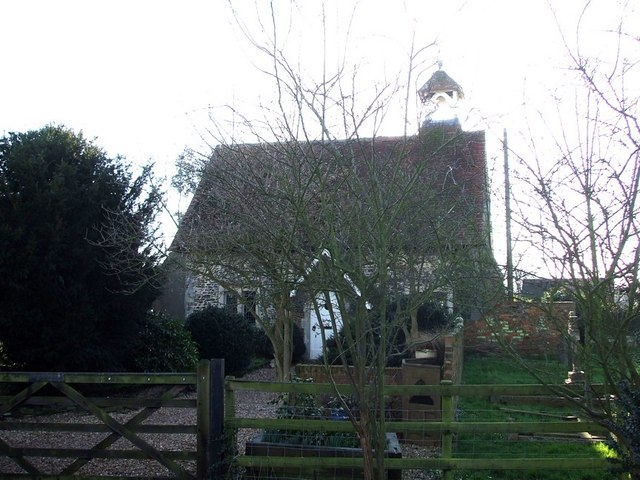

- Location within Buckinghamshire
- Civil parish: Slapton
- Unitary authority: Buckinghamshire
- Ceremonial county: Buckinghamshire
- Region: South East
- Country: England
- Sovereign state: United Kingdom

Grove is a hamlet in the civil parish of Slapton in Buckinghamshire, England. It is on the border with Bedfordshire, just to the north of Mentmore. The place name 'grove' means the place by the grove or copse of trees.

Grove was recorded as Grova in the Domesday Book of 1086 as Grova.

In medieval times there was an abbey or priory of nuns in the parish, founded in 1169 by Henry II and attached to Fontevrault Abbey in France. Following the wars with France it was given to the dean and canons of Windsor. The remains of this abbey were fully excavated in the late 1960s just before they were lost forever in connection with the sand-quarrying industry of Leighton Buzzard. It has been suggested that before this Grove may once have been an important place of worship in even more ancient times, thus leading to its establishment as a separate parish. The parish church was dedicated to St. Michael, the dragon slayer.

There was also in addition to the priory, a house of Cistercian monks, subordinate to Woburn Abbey.

Immediately adjoining Grove is the site of a former a hamlet known as South Waddon. Today this remains only as the name of a farm, but earth workings in the area suggest a substantial settlement.

Grove Church was converted into a small private house in the late 1970s. The area that has become the sitting room of the house has the macabre feature of a Medieval human skeleton buried under a glass panel. The skull is surrounded in turn by the skeletons of small birds, thought to have been put there to ward off evil spirits. Part of the churchyard containing the newest graves was retained by the church authorities, following their controversial decision to sell the church. It remains today but is closed for further burials.

A large farmhouse dominating the village, was during the early 1960s turned into a Victorian gothic mansion complete with clock tower when it was the property of the Shand-Kydd family. The house overlooks and indeed is a landmark for the boats on The Grand Union Canal which actually flows through the centre of the village. A former lock-keeper's cottage at nearby Grove Lock was in 2001 converted into a public house and restaurant.

Grove was an ancient parish in the Cottesloe Hundred of Buckinghamshire. The ecclesiastical parish was abolished in 1973, since when Grove has formed part of the ecclesiastical parish of Wing with Grove. The civil parish of Grove was abolished in 1982 and its area absorbed into the parish of Slapton. At the 1971 census (one of the last before the abolition of the parish), Grove had a population of 15.
