= Leighton Buzzard Urban District =

Former local government area in the UK

Coordinates: 51.9165°N 0.6617°W

Leighton Buzzard
- Urban District
- Area
  - 1891: 2,426 acres (9.8 km^{2})
  - 1961: 2,487 acres (10.1 km^{2})
- Population
  - 1891: 6,704
  - 1961: 11,745
- History
  - Created: 7 July 1891
  - Abolished: 31 March 1965
  - Succeeded by: Leighton-Linslade Urban District
- Status: Local Government District (1891–1894); Urban District (1894–1965)
  - HQ: Leighton Buzzard
- Contained within
  - County Council: Bedfordshire
- Map of boundary as of abolition

The town of Leighton Buzzard in Bedfordshire, England, was administered as a Local Government District from 1891 to 1894 and an Urban District from 1894 to 1965.

== Formation ==
Prior to 1891 the town had formed part of the Leighton Buzzard Rural Sanitary District, which had been created under the Public Health Acts of 1872 and 1875 covering the same area as the Leighton Buzzard Poor Law Union. On 7 July 1891 a Local Government District was established for the town, covering the township of Leighton Buzzard (being that part of the ancient parish of Leighton Buzzard excluding the hamlets of Billington, Eggington, Heath and Reach, and Stanbridge), removing the town from the Leighton Buzzard Rural Sanitary District.

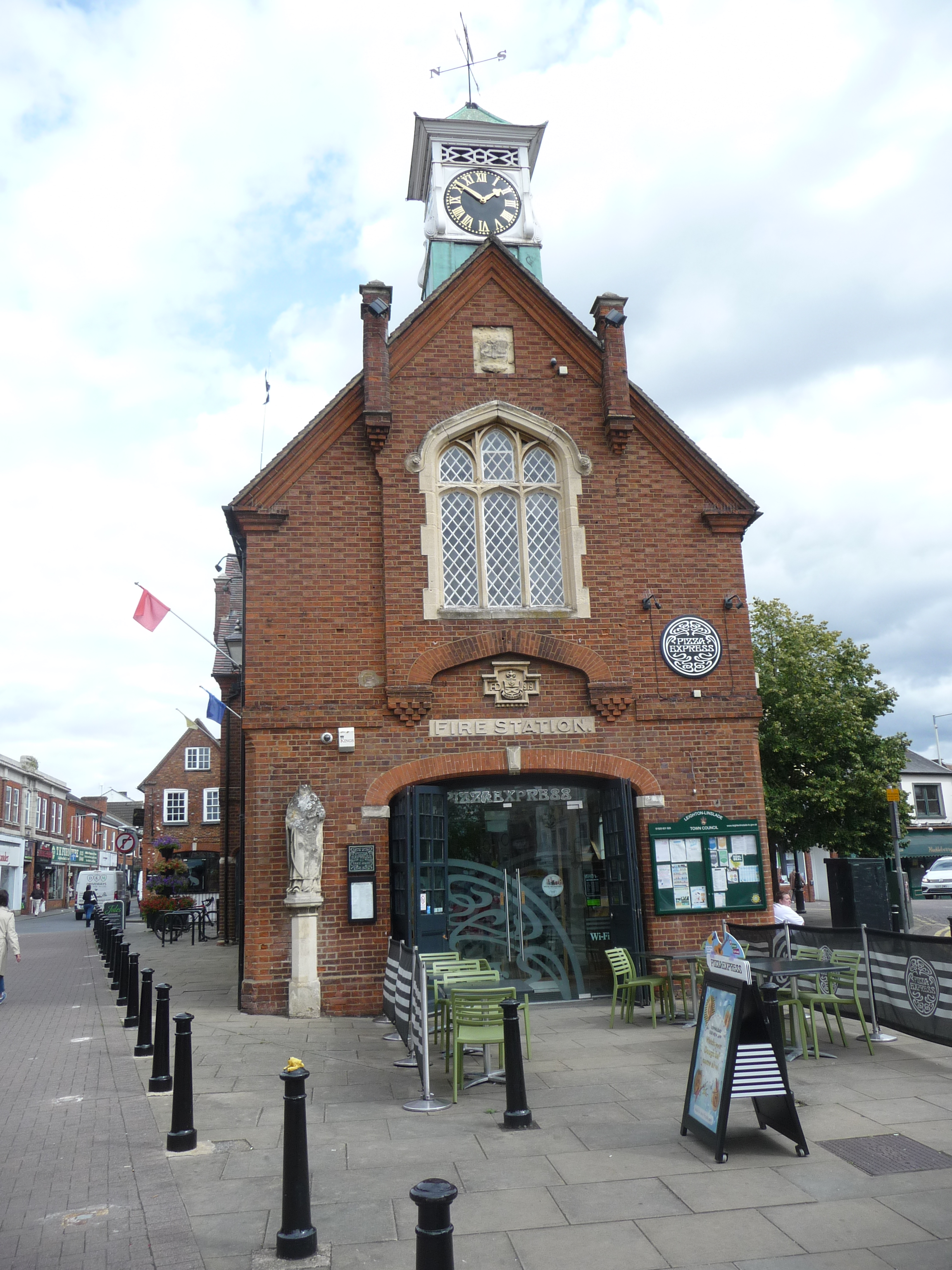
Old Town Hall, meeting place 1891–1892, converted to a fire station in 1919

The first meeting of the new Local Board was held on 27 August 1891 at the Old Town Hall in Leighton Buzzard. The first chairman was William Sharp Page, who was also the chairman of the Board of Guardians for the Poor Law Union.

Under the Local Government Act 1894, Local Government Districts became Urban Districts from 31 December 1894. The Urban District Council first met under its new title on 3 January 1895, with William Page continuing to serve as chairman.

== Premises ==
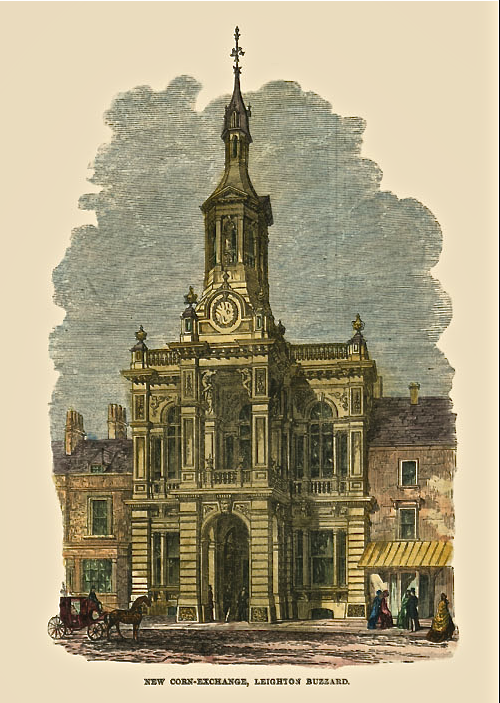
Leighton Buzzard Corn Exchange, meeting place 1892–1905. Demolished c. 1968.

The Local Board initially held its meetings at the Old Town Hall (also known as the Market Hall) in the Market Place in Leighton Buzzard, up until February 1892. From March 1892 until October 1905 meetings were held at the town's Corn Exchange on Lake Street.

In 1905 the council took possession of the former Working Men's Institute at 77 North Street in Leighton Buzzard, which was converted to provide offices and a meeting place for the council. Council meetings were held there from November 1905 onwards. The building also accommodated the town's library between 1939 and 1948.

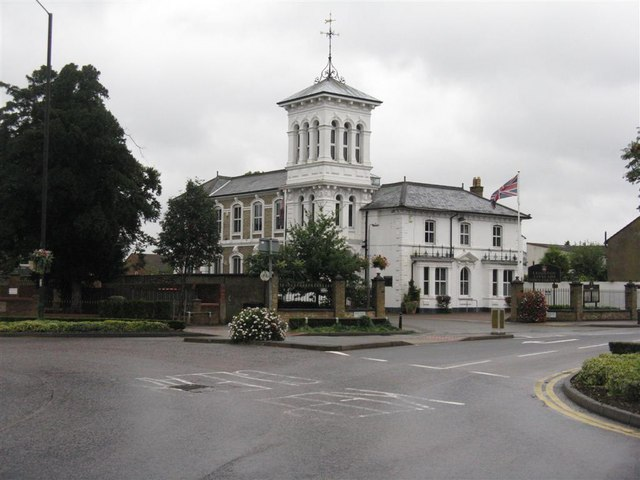
White House, 37 Hockliffe Street: the council's offices after 1962

The council continued to be based at 77 North Street until 1962, when it moved to a large house called the White House at 37 Hockliffe Street. The North Street building was demolished shortly afterwards.

== Abolition ==
On 1 April 1965 Leighton Buzzard Urban District merged with the neighbouring Linslade Urban District, which until then had been in Buckinghamshire, to create a new Bedfordshire urban district called Leighton-Linslade. Leighton-Linslade Urban District Council continued to use the White House as its offices.
