= Angus McBean =

Welsh photographer

- Born: 8 June 1904; Newbridge, Monmouthshire, Wales
- Died: 9 June 1990 (aged 86); Ipswich, England
- Occupation: Photographer

Angus Rowland McBean (8 June 1904 – 9 June 1990) was a Welsh photographer, set designer and cult figure associated with surrealism.

== Early life ==
Angus Rowland McBean was born in Newbridge, Monmouthshire, Wales on 8 June 1904, elder child and only son of Clement Philip James McBean, of Scottish descent, and Irene Sarah, née Thomas, of Welsh origin. His father, a former second lieutenant in the South Wales Borderers, was a surveyor in the mines and the family moved frequently around Wales with his job. McBean attended Monmouth School and Newport Technical College, at which time he developed an interest in photography. Fascinated by the apparently magical properties of this process, Angus wanted to be able to take pictures of people and sold a gold watch left to him by his grandfather to raise the five pounds necessary for the equipment.

At the age of fifteen McBean took part in the amateur dramatics productions at the Lyceum Theatre in Monmouth, where he was mostly involved in the creation of sets, props and costumes. Later in life he credited this experience as being the start of his lifelong interest in dressing up and performing.

== Early work ==
In 1925, after his father's early death from tuberculosis, contracted in the trenches during the First World War, McBean moved with his mother and younger sister Rowena to a three bedroomed cottage at 21 Lowfield Road, West Acton. For the next seven years he worked for Liberty's department store in the antiques department learning restoration, while his personal life was spent in photography, mask-making and watching plays in the West End theatre. In 1932 he left Liberty's and grew his distinctive beard to symbolise the fact that he would never be a wage-slave again. Meeting the stage designers Motley Theatre Design Group he helped in creating theatrical props, including a commission of medieval scenery and some shoes for John Gielgud's 1933 production of Richard of Bordeaux.

=== Hugh Cecil ===
McBean's masks became a talking point in social columns, and were much admired by the leading London West End photographer Hugh Cecil. Cecil offered him an assistant's post at his New Grafton Street studio where McBean learnt how to retouch large glass negatives and other useful techniques, whilst working on his own photographs in the evenings. Having learnt the secrets of Cecil's softer style, McBean set up his own studio 18 months later in a basement in Belgrave Road, Victoria, London.

=== Pre-War photography ===
The artist McBean, as he was still known as a mask maker, gained a commission in 1936 from Ivor Novello for masks for his play "The Happy Hypocrite". Novello was so impressed with McBean's romantic photographs that he commissioned him to take a set of production photographs as well, including young actress Vivien Leigh. The results, taken on stage with McBean's idiosyncratic lighting, instantly replaced the set already made by the long-established but stolid Stage Photo Company. McBean had a new career and a photographic leading lady: he was to photograph Vivien Leigh on stage and in the studio for almost every performance she gave until her death thirty years later.

McBean resultantly became one of the most significant portrait photographers of the 20th century, and was known as a photographer of celebrities. In the spring of 1942 his career was temporarily ruined when he was arrested in Bath for criminal acts of homosexuality. He was sentenced to four years in prison and was released in the autumn of 1944. After the Second World War, McBean was able to successfully resume his career.

=== Post World War II ===
There were in effect two periods to McBean's career, his pre- and post-war phases. Pre-war he was a lot more confident in himself and experimented successfully with surrealism, indeed his work with the likes of Vivien Leigh are some of the most accessible surrealist photographic images known. Post war he reverted to a more regular style of portraiture photography, nearly always working with the entertainment and theatre profession.

In 1945, not sure whether he would find work again, McBean set up a new studio in a bomb-damaged building in Endell Street, Covent Garden. He sold his Soho camera for £35, and bought a new half-plate Kodak View monorail camera to which he attached his trusted Zeiss lenses. McBean was commissioned first by the Stratford Memorial Theatre to photograph a production of Anthony and Cleopatra, and all his former clients quickly returned. Through the late 1940s and 50s he was the official photographer at Stratford, the Royal Opera House, Sadler's Wells, Glyndebourne, the Old Vic and at all the productions of H. M. Tennent, servicing the theatrical, musical and ballet star system. (An example of his work in this genre from 1951 can be seen on the page about Anne Sharp, whom he photographed in a role in one of Benjamin Britten's operas.) Magazines such as The Sketch and Tatler and Bystander vied to commission McBean's new series of surreal portraits. In 1952 he photographed Pamela Green as Botticelli's Venus, with David Ball, his boyfriend, as Zephyrus.

Despite the decline in demand for theatre and production art during the 1950s, McBean's creative and striking ideas provided him with work in the emergent record cover business with companies such as EMI, when he was commissioned to create Cliff Richard's first four album sleeves. McBean's later works included being the photographer for the cover of The Beatles' first album Please Please Me, as well as commissions by a number of other performers. In 1969 he returned with the Beatles to the same location to shoot the cover for their album Get Back. This later came out as Let It Be with a different cover, but McBean's photo was used (together with an outtake from the Please Please Me cover shoot) for the cover of the Beatles' 1962–1966 and 1967–1970 compilations in 1973. In his later years he became more selective of the work he undertook, and continued to explore surrealism whilst taking portrait photographs of individuals such as Agatha Christie, Audrey Hepburn, Laurence Olivier and Noël Coward. Both periods of his work (pre and post war) are now eagerly sought by collectors and his work sits in many major collections around the world.

=== Christmas cards ===
Evidence of his innovative photographic techniques and surrealist themes can be found in the many Christmas cards he created. For these images he constructed elaborate sets along with detailed props and miniatures, often taking weeks to produce the desired effect.

== End of career and death ==
He was an influence on the young John Shand Kydd. In the 1960s, he bought Flemings Hall in Bedingfield, Suffolk and undertook a major restoration. He lived there until his death.

Despite reducing the number of commissions he undertook in his later years, McBean continued to work selectively on projects such as French magazine L'Officiel and French Vogue (1983). In 1984 McBean appeared, credited as "special guest", in the music video for "Red Guitar", the debut solo single by British musician-composer David Sylvian. According to his website, Sylvian had developed a strong interest in McBean's work and he and director Anton Corbijn invited McBean to appear in the video, which was an homage to McBean, and was directly inspired by his famous 1938 photographic work "Flora Robson Surrealised".

In 1990, McBean fell ill whilst on holiday in Morocco, and after returning to England, he died at Ipswich Heath Road Hospital on his eighty-sixth birthday.

=== Conclusion ===
Two figures have overshadowed McBean's reputation: Cecil Beaton (thanks to his lavish lifestyle and work for Vogue and the British royal family); and David Bailey, who much later (1960s) was close to Cecil Beaton both personally and in terms of style. McBean did not enjoy this level of fame either in his life or after death, even though he was arguably the better technically and artistically. Additionally McBean's focus on the world of theatre (particularly London's West End) did not give him international recognition. In 2007, seven original colour transparencies (slides) of his photographs for the Beatles album cover Please Please Me were accidentally thrown in the bin at the headquarters of EMI.

== Gallery ==
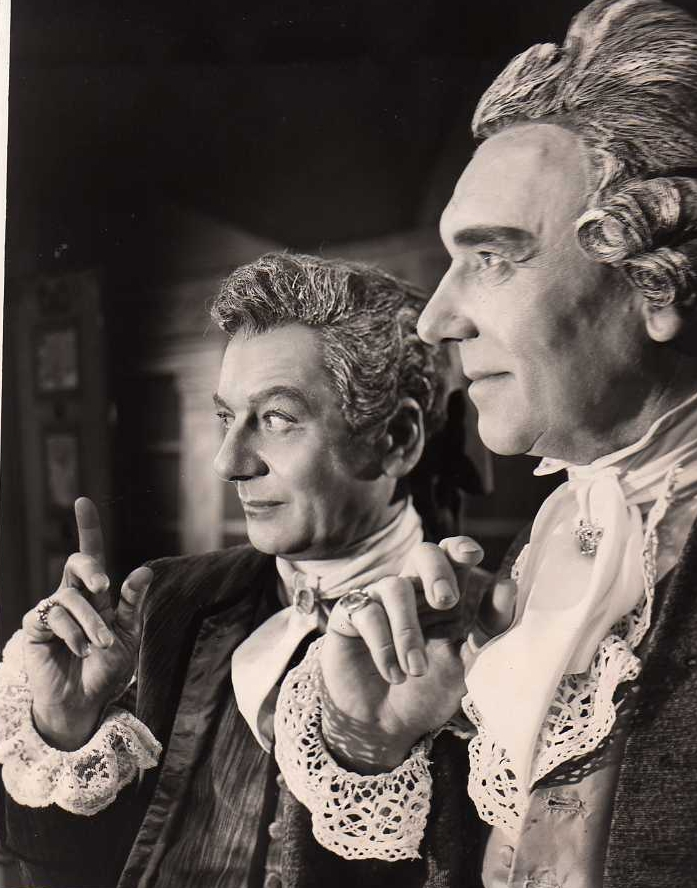
The School for Scandal 1963

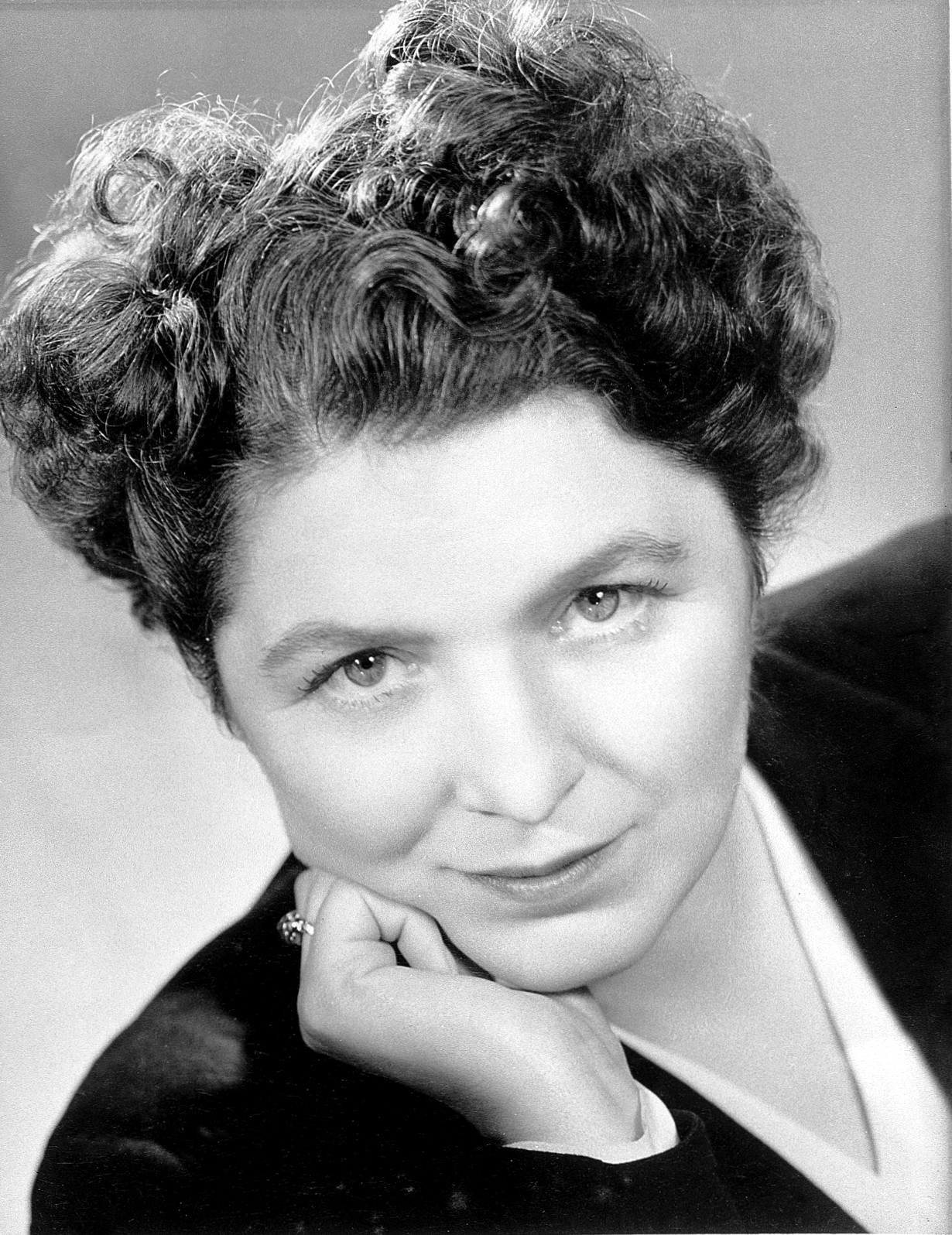
Photograph of Mary Irene Cathcart Wellcome L0023910

== Exhibitions ==
- Angus McBean Portraits, National Portrait Gallery, London, July to October 2006.
- Graves Art Gallery, Sheffield, December 2006 – March 2007.
- National Museum Wales Cardiff, March – June 2007. Catalogue selected and edited by Terence Pepper, including interview with Sir Paul McCartney.
