= Soulbury =

Village in Buckinghamshire, England

Coordinates: 51.9363°N 0.7183°W

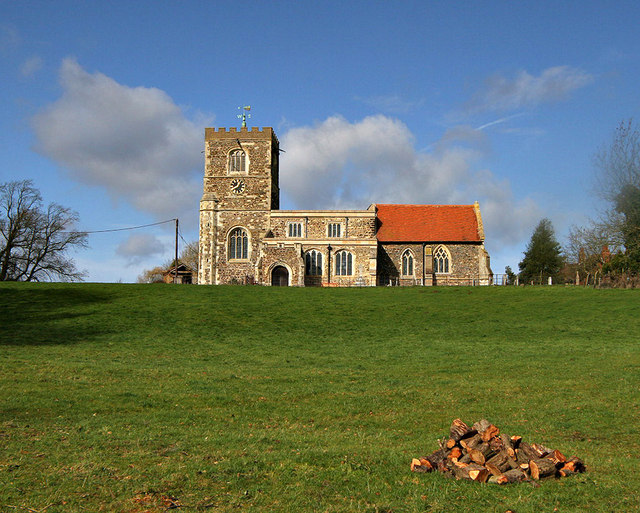
- All Saints' Church

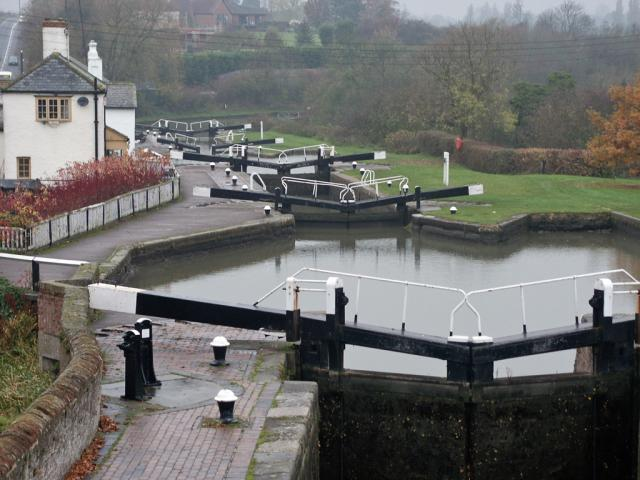
- Soulbury Three Locks

- Location within Buckinghamshire
- Population: 736 (2011 census)
- OS grid reference: SP885275
- Civil parish: Soulbury
- Unitary authority: Buckinghamshire
- Ceremonial county: Buckinghamshire
- Region: South East
- Country: England
- Sovereign state: United Kingdom
- Post town: LEIGHTON BUZZARD
- Postcode district: LU7
- Dialling code: 01525
- Police: Thames Valley
- Fire: Buckinghamshire
- Ambulance: South Central
- UK Parliament: Buckingham and Bletchley

Soulbury is a village and also a civil parish within the unitary authority area of Buckinghamshire, England. It is located in the Aylesbury Vale, about seven miles south of Central Milton Keynes, and three miles north of Wing. The village name is Anglo Saxon in origin, and means "stronghold in a gully". In the Domesday Book of 1086, the village was recorded as Soleberie.

== The parish ==
The parish contains the hamlets of:

- Hollingdon in the west,
- Chelmscote on the Stoke Hammond to Leighton Buzzard road,
- Bragenham to the east of the River Ouzel, and
- Stockgrove near Stockgrove Country Park on the border with Bedfordshire.

Other places mentioned in historical records include:

- Lortun Hill and
- a road called London Street, (mentioning William Holynden)
- Hongurhell

The parish extends as far as Rammamere Farm on Watling Street. Rammamere Heath is managed with King's Wood in Heath and Reach as a nature reserve.

== Liscombe Park ==
A 17th-century mansion, Liscombe Park was originally the seat of the Lovett family, of whom the most famous member was Colonel John Lovett (c. 1660–1710), patron of the Eddystone Lighthouse. The house was rebuilt in the 1920s by the Bonsor family who live there today. The house is built of brick with small turrets and crenelations, in the style of an 18th-century pseudo gothic castle. The interiors are a mixture of panelling and some 18th-century styles. Near to the house is the former much older chapel, this today has been converted to a billiards room. The house is not open to the public, but the gardens are sometimes used for fairs and fetes.

The stable block has been converted to a leisure and health complex, with a polo cross field. There is a riding stables, open to the public, adjacent to the complex.

An early mention of the name as Lyscombe appears in 1418, where Roger Stok and his wife, Sara, lived, suing people from Stewkley (appearing as Stucle) and Burcote.

Soulbury gave its name to Solebury Township, Pennsylvania, which was founded by Quaker settlers from Soulbury.

== Glacial erratic rock ==
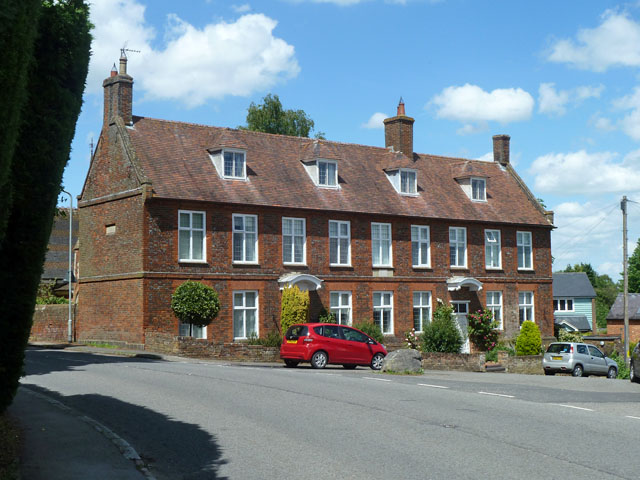
Lovett House, Chapel Hill – the stone known as the Soulbury Boot is close to the front of the red car

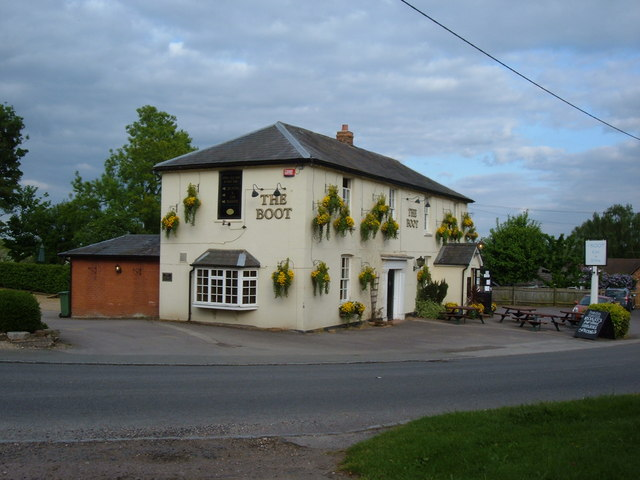
The Boot public house.

A glacial erratic lies in a road in the parish. The stone originated in Derbyshire, and was deposited by the retreat of glaciers at the end of the last ice age. Oliver Cromwell is said to have used the stone as a podium during an attack on the village church during the English Civil War. Local tradition holds that the stone is the petrified foot of the devil.

In March 2016, the stone was hit by a motorist who made complaints of it being a hazard, prompting the county council to investigate its removal. The parish council and villagers strongly opposed its removal and the stone still remains in its ancient position.

There is a public house in Soulbury called the Boot. Its pub sign features a boot of the Duke of Wellington, but the tradition of the Soulbury Boot is said to be much older than that. It is said that the Devil himself once came to the village, but the villagers came together to fight him off. One of them took his sword and cut off the Devil's foot and as it fell to the ground it turned to stone. The stone came to be known as the Soulbury Boot. This story is said by some to have been made up by a previous pub landlord in order to attract visitors.

=== Soulbury Millennium Green ===
This public greenspace is owned and run by a local charitable trust and was created as part of the celebrations for the turn of the Millennium in the year 2000. It is one of 245 such Millennium Greens throughout England and the only one in Buckinghamshire.
