= Kings and Bakers Woods and Heaths =

Nature reserve in Bedfordshire and Buckinghamshire, England

Coordinates: 51.96°N 0.655°W

- Site of Special Scientific Interest
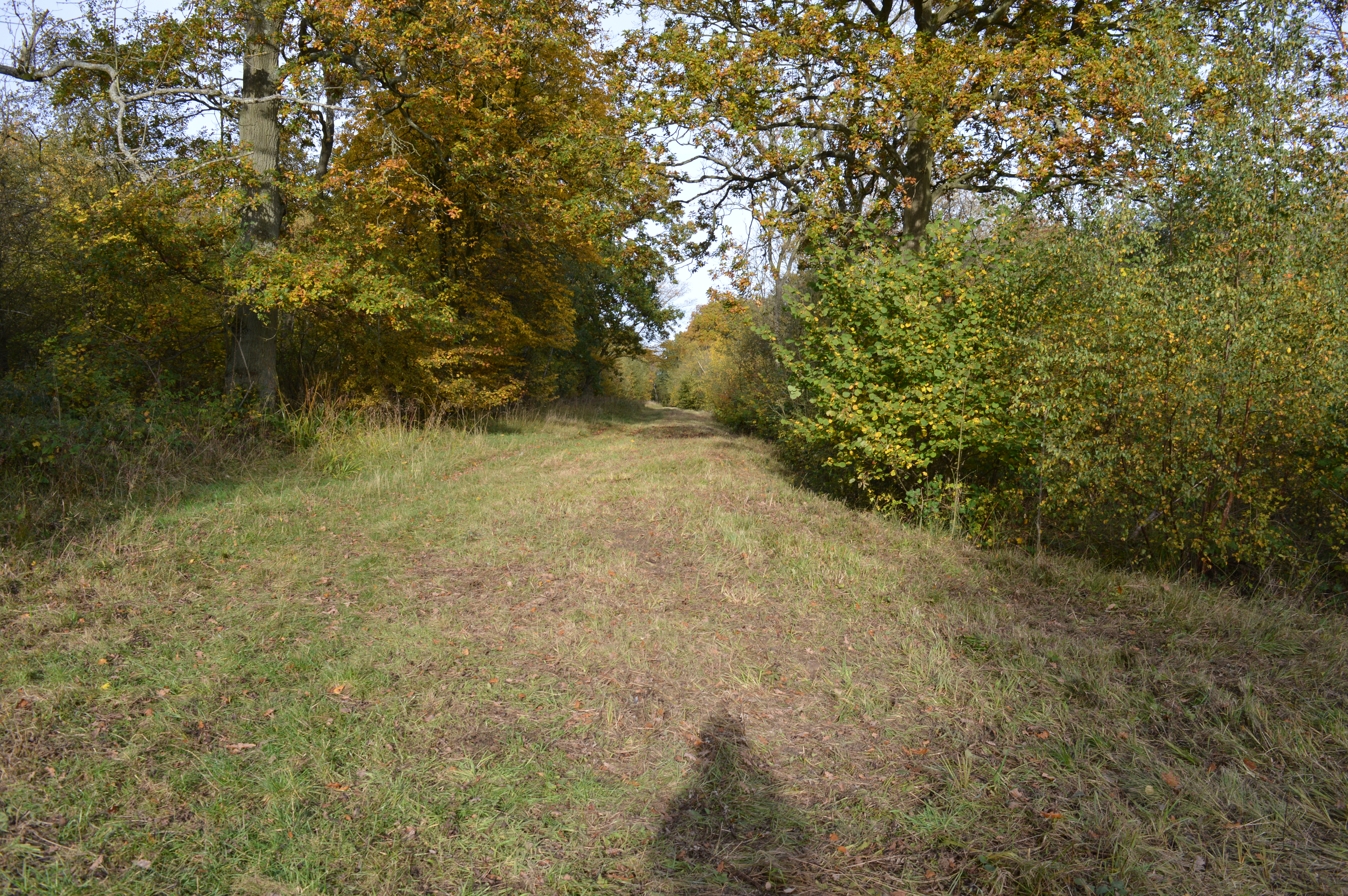
- Location of Kings and Bakers Woods and Heaths.
- Area of search: Bedfordshire; Buckinghamshire
- Grid reference: SP925295
- Interest: Biological
- Area: 212.8 ha (526 acres)
- Notification date: 1984
- Location map: Magic Map

Kings and Bakers Woods and Heaths is a 212.8-hectare (526-acre) Site of Special Scientific Interest (SSSI) between Heath and Reach in Bedfordshire and Great Brickhill in Buckinghamshire. The site is mainly in Bedfordshire but includes Rammamere Heath in Buckinghamshire. It was notified in 1984 under Section 28 of the Wildlife and Countryside Act 1981, and the local planning authorities are Central Bedfordshire Council and Aylesbury Vale Council. Part of it is a National Nature Reserve, and part of it is a nature reserve managed by the Wildlife Trust for Bedfordshire, Cambridgeshire and Northamptonshire. it is also a Nature Conservation Review site.

The site has the largest remaining area of woodland in Bedfordshire, together with lowland heath, acidic grassland and some small ponds. There are a number of rare plant species, including great woodrush, wood vetch and saw-wort. There are also abundant birds and insects, including white admiral butterflies and tree pipits.

There is parking in Stockgrove Country Park, which is partly in the SSSI.

== See also ==
- King's Wood, Heath and Reach
