= Shand Kydd =

Shand Kydd is an English surname. It may refer to:

- Frances Shand Kydd (1936–2004), the mother of Diana, Princess of Wales
- John Shand Kydd (born 1959), British photographer
- Peter Shand Kydd (1925–2006), onetime stepfather of Diana, Princess of Wales

== See also ==
- Shand
- Kydd (surname)
