= Southcote, Bedfordshire =

Hamlet in Bedfordshire, England

Coordinates: 51.913°N 0.684°W

Southcote
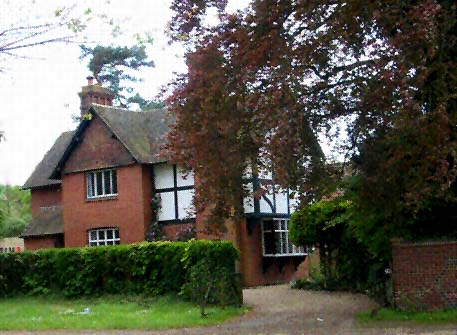
- Typical 19th century "Rothschild style" cottage at Southcote

- Location within Bedfordshire
- OS grid reference: SP906246
- Civil parish: Leighton-Linslade
- Unitary authority: Central Bedfordshire
- Ceremonial county: Bedfordshire
- Region: East
- Country: England
- Sovereign state: United Kingdom
- Post town: LEIGHTON BUZZARD
- Postcode district: LU7
- Dialling code: 01525
- Police: Bedfordshire
- Fire: Bedfordshire
- Ambulance: East of England
- UK Parliament: South West Bedfordshire

Southcote (or Southcott) is a hamlet in the parish of Linslade, in Bedfordshire, England. It is in the civil parish of Leighton-Linslade. The hamlet name is Anglo Saxon in origin and means 'southern cottage'.

The hamlet, little more than one road of cottages, is located to the south of the small town of Linslade, to which it has become joined as Linslade has grown. Linslade has itself joined to the larger town of Leighton Buzzard and hence Southcote appears to be a small suburb of Leighton Buzzard. The hamlet is home to the Hare Inn, a pub located on Southcott Green. There has been a pub in Southcott since at least 1847, although the pub was not known as The Hare until 1876.

The Rothschild family who reside at nearby Ascott House maintain a stud farm at Southcote, and own the remaining agricultural land in the hamlet. Built in 1880, the stud farm and its adjoining former managers' homes are known as "Southcourt Stud". This leads to confusion as to the hamlet's true name, especially as in the immediate vicinity is a Southcourt Avenue.

The stud farm is home to numerous "Rothschild home counties style" cottages, including the former stud groom's quarters at neighbouring St Frusquins Cottage, named after champion racehorse St. Frusquin, who retired to stud at Southcourt. The Cottage hosted numerous visitors to the stud farm, including former Prime Minister Winston Churchill who became a prolific owner and trainer of racehorses in his later years.

Southcourt Cottage, a large Victorian house, close to the stud, was from 1922 to 1951 let by the Rothschild family to Sir Basil Henriques the philanthropist and social reformer, known for his work with Jewish youth in the east end of London. Southcourt Cottage became a holiday home for these children. He also wrote several books on reforming juvenile law, and founded educational youth clubs in the Whitechapel area of the city.

Southcote was transferred from Buckinghamshire to Bedfordshire in 1974. The hamlet is home to numerous listed buildings, and in 1993 Southcott Village was designated as a Conservation Area.

Southcott Lower School in Linslade is named after the parish.
