= Church of All Saints, Leighton Buzzard =

Church in Bedfordshire, England

All Saints Church
- Church of All Saints, Leighton Buzzard
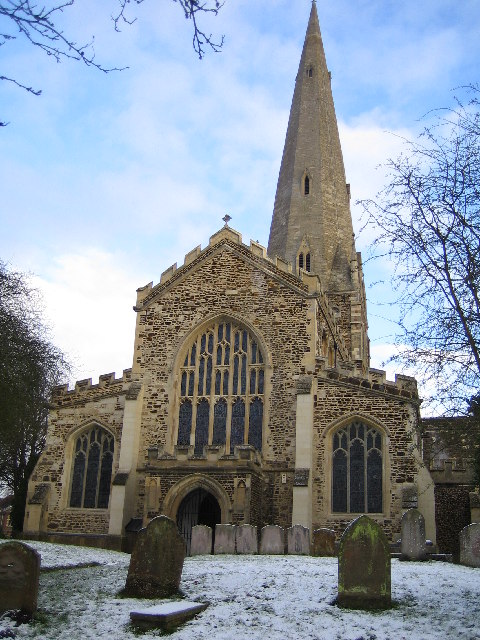
- All Saints Church
- Country: England
- Denomination: Church of England
- Churchmanship: Liberal Catholic
- Website: All Saints Church

Administration
- Province: Canterbury
- Diocese: St Albans
- Deanery: Dunstable

All Saints Church, Leighton Buzzard is an Grade I listed parish church in the town of Leighton Buzzard in Bedfordshire, England. The building dates from the late 13th century, with major alterations in the 15th century, and includes a west tower with a broach spire. The church was severely damaged by fire in 1985 and subsequently restored, and retains medieval features alongside later additions.

== History ==
=== Early history ===
The church dates from the late 13th century, with a recorded date of 1277, and replaced an earlier building on the site. The tower and spire were constructed around 1290. In the 15th century, the building was extensively altered, when new windows were inserted, a clerestory was added, and the roof was renewed, probably under the patronage of Alice de la Pole, Duchess of Suffolk. The present font may survive from the earlier church.

=== 1985 fire and restoration ===
On 13 April 1985, a major fire severely damaged the church, destroying the chancel roof, organ and bells, and damaging the spire and nave roof. Most of the interior was ruined, although the walls and tower survived. Restoration followed, with efforts made to retain as much historic fabric as possible. The 11th-century Sanctus bell and a 13th-century lectern survived.

Rebuilding the church included new roofs, vestries and parish rooms, a chapel dedicated to St Hugh, a new organ and bells, and a new altar made of Totternhoe stone. Further repairs began in 1999 as part of a phased programme to address structural problems, including damage caused by the use of cement rather than lime mortar, as well as long-term weathering and the effects of the fire. More than £1.5 million was spent on repairs between 2000 and the mid-2010s.

== Architecture ==
=== Structure ===
The church is built of ironstone and has a plan comprising a nave, chancel, aisles, transepts, and a west tower with a broach spire. The tower rises in stages and becomes octagonal at the belfry before continuing into the spire. The chancel is about the same length as the nave, and the building is mainly Perpendicular in style, apart from the arcades. A vestry with two upper storeys stands to the north of the chancel and dates from the 15th century. The exterior includes 15th-century gargoyles and several sundials. The west doorway retains late 13th-century ironwork with scrollwork hinges attributed to Thomas of Leighton.

=== Interior ===
The interior is largely Perpendicular in character. The nave has arcades separating it from the aisles. The 15th-century roof and clerestory were added under the patronage of Alice de la Pole. The roof is decorated with carved corbels depicting angels, including figures holding Instruments of the Passion, with additional carved and gilded angels forming part of the decorative scheme. The chancel includes a reredos by G. F. Bodley with carved panels of the Crucifixion, and choir stalls with misericords, possibly reused from St Albans Abbey.

Medieval graffiti survives on the arcades, piers, and crossing arches, including figures, animals, and geometric designs. A carving in the south transept, known as “Simon and Nellie,” has been linked in local tradition to the origin of the Simnel cake.

=== Furnishings, fittings and monuments ===
The church contains several historic features, including a 13th-century eagle lectern and a font from an earlier building. The chancel retains late 14th-century misericords and 15th-century choir stalls with poppy-head ends. The high altar includes a reredos designed by G. F. Bodley with carved alabaster figures. Other fittings include 17th-century altar rails and a carved cedar pulpit, given in 1638 by Edward Wilkes.

Monuments include effigies of members of the Wyngate family (d. 1603) and the Welles family (d. 1645), together with brasses dated 1597 and 1636.

=== Glass ===
The church contains a large number of stained glass windows by C. E. Kempe, dating from the late 19th and early 20th centuries, including those in the clerestory and a west window depicting saints. The south transept contains a window of four archangels installed after the 1985 fire.
