= Shand =

Shand is a surname of Scottish descent, also spelt Schawand, Schaand, Schande and Schand. It may refer to:

== People ==
- Adam Shand (journalist) (born 1962), Australian writer and journalist
- Adam Shand (manager), New Zealand visual effects operations manager and advocate of community wireless networks, founder of Personal Telco
- Alexander Shand, 1st Baron Shand (1828–1904), Scottish advocate and judge
- Alexander Faulkner Shand (1858–1936), English writer and barrister
- Bob Shand (1866–1934), South African international rugby union player
- Bruce Shand (1917–2006), British Army major, father of Queen Camilla
- Camilla Shand (born 1947), maiden name of Queen Camilla
- David Shand (born 1956), Canadian ice hockey defenseman
- David Shand (bishop) (1921–2011), Australian Anglican bishop
- Donald Shand (1904–1976), Australian grazier and founder of East-West Airlines
- Elspeth Shand (1932–2022), maiden name of Elspeth Howe, Baroness Howe of Idlicote, British crossbencher life peer
- Ernest Shand (1868–1924), Victorian guitarist and composer
- Hector Shand (1879–1942), Scottish footballer
- James Shand (1870–1944), Australian politician
- Jimmy Shand (1908–2000), Scottish musician who played traditional Scottish dance music
- John Shand (1834–1914) Scottish mathematician who emigrated to New Zealand to be a professor at Dunedin
- Mark Shand (1951–2014), British travel writer, brother of Queen Camilla
- Neil Shand (1934–2018), British television comedy writer
- Ninham Shand (1889-1969), South African civil engineer
- Paris Shand (born 2001), American football player
- Philip Morton Shand (1895–1960), English architect, design critic and wine and food writer, grandfather of Queen Camilla
- Phyllis Shand Allfrey (1915–1986), née Shand, West Indian writer, socialist activist, newspaper editor and politician of Dominica
- Remy Shand (born 1978), Canadian R&B/soul singer
- Richard Shand (1916–1965), New Zealand cricketer
- Ron Shand (1906–1993), Australian actor and comedian
- Samuel James Shand (1882–1957), British geologist
- Tom Shand (1911–1969), New Zealand Member of Parliament
- Tonia Shand (1939–2020), Australian diplomat and public servant

== Fictional characters ==
- Shand, in Ian Irvine's The View from the Mirror novels
- Fennec Shand, a bounty huntress in the Star Wars universe

== See also ==
- Eric Loudoun-Shand (1893–1972), rugby union player
- Stewart Loudoun-Shand VC (1879–1916), British Army major and recipient of the Victoria Cross
- William A. Shands (1889–1973), American politician
- Shand Mason, British fire engine manufacturer
