= Slapton, Buckinghamshire =

Village and civil parish in Buckinghamshire, England

Coordinates: 51.8778°N 0.6442°W

Slapton
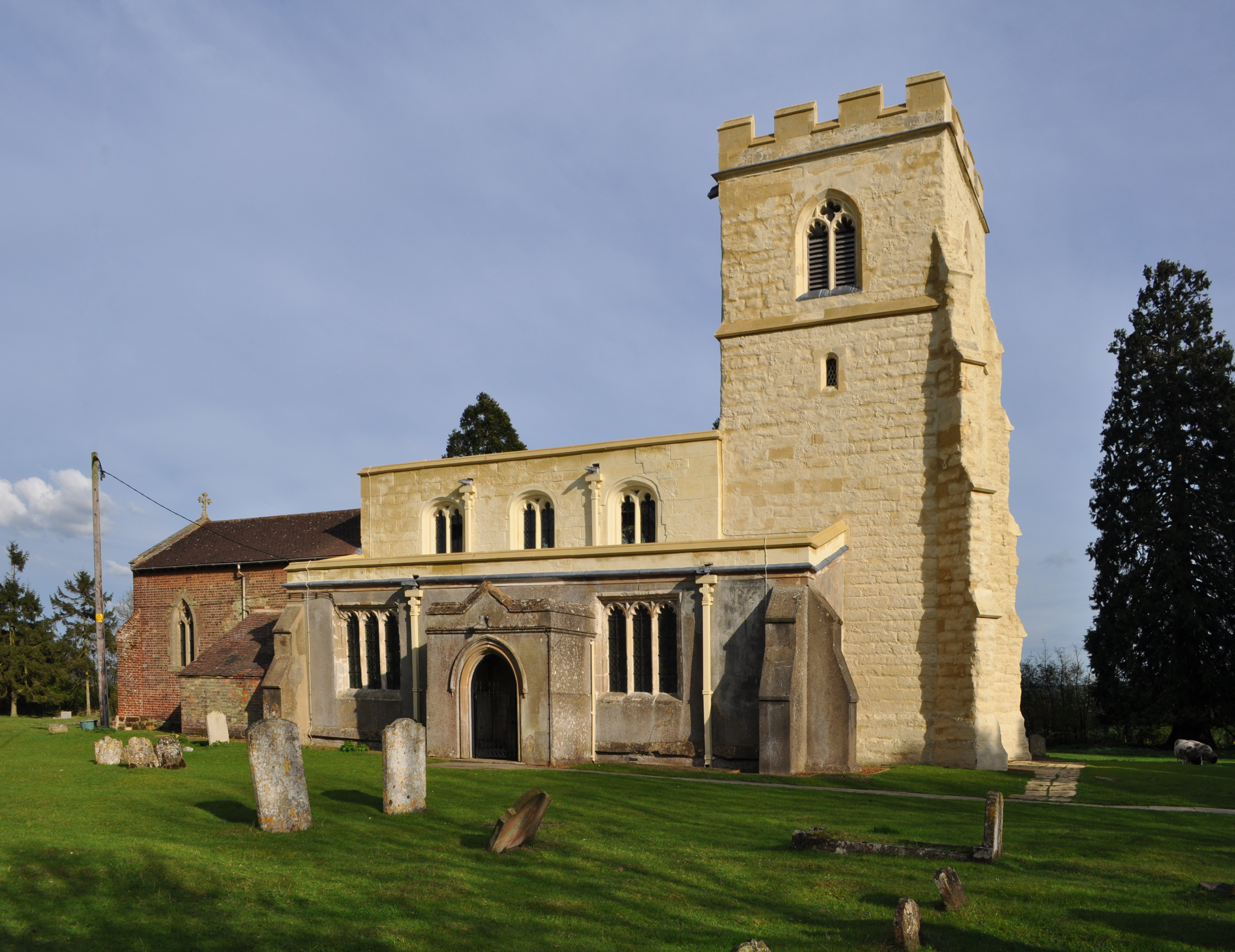
- Holy Cross Church, Slapton

- Location within Buckinghamshire
- Population: 528 (2011 Census)
- OS grid reference: SP934207
- Civil parish: Slapton
- Unitary authority: Buckinghamshire
- Ceremonial county: Buckinghamshire
- Region: South East
- Country: England
- Sovereign state: United Kingdom
- Post town: LEIGHTON BUZZARD
- Postcode district: LU7
- Dialling code: 01525
- Police: Thames Valley
- Fire: Buckinghamshire
- Ambulance: South Central
- UK Parliament: Aylesbury

Slapton is a village and civil parish in Buckinghamshire, England. It is located between the Grand Union Canal and the boundary with Bedfordshire, about 3 mi (5 km) south of Leighton Buzzard and 3 mi (5 km) west of Edlesborough.

== Hamlets ==
Towards the edge of the parish near Horton in Ivinghoe is the hamlet of Horton Wharf. The village of Grove is also within the boundary of Slapton parish.

== History ==
The village name is Anglo Saxon in origin, and means "farm by a slippery place". This village was recorded in the Domesday Book of 1086 as Slapetone.

The manor of Slapton once belonged to a convent in Barking, Essex, though it was seized by the Crown in the Dissolution of the Monasteries in 1547. The manor was for some time after that the property of the Earl of Bridgwater.

The village hall was built and given to the village by the Griffin family of Bury Farm in memory of Elizabeth Griffin in the 1950s. Until recently, the Griffin family continued to own Bury Farm, and had the unusual distinction of farming buffalo in the village. Slapton once had a splendid 18th century rectory of classical design. This was demolished in the 1960s and a development of four-bedroom terraced and semi-detached houses in the style of that era was built on its site.

There was a farm (Church Farm) immediately next to the church until the mid-1970s; this property had been in the ownership of one family since 1086, having originally been given to the de Tournais by William the Conqueror. The family survived in Slapton, spelling their name in various ways, until the death of William Turney around 1975. He was childless, so the farm was sold for the first time in 900 years. The new owners demolished the farmhouse and buildings, and on the site built a development of houses and flats known as Tournay Court.

=== Current ===
Today Slapton contains few old buildings of any architectural merit. The church, dedicated to the Holy Cross, is of plain design with tower, nave and chancel. The chancel is probably the oldest part of the building. The churchyard contains many memorials to the Turney and Buckmaster families.

=== Local history and interest ===
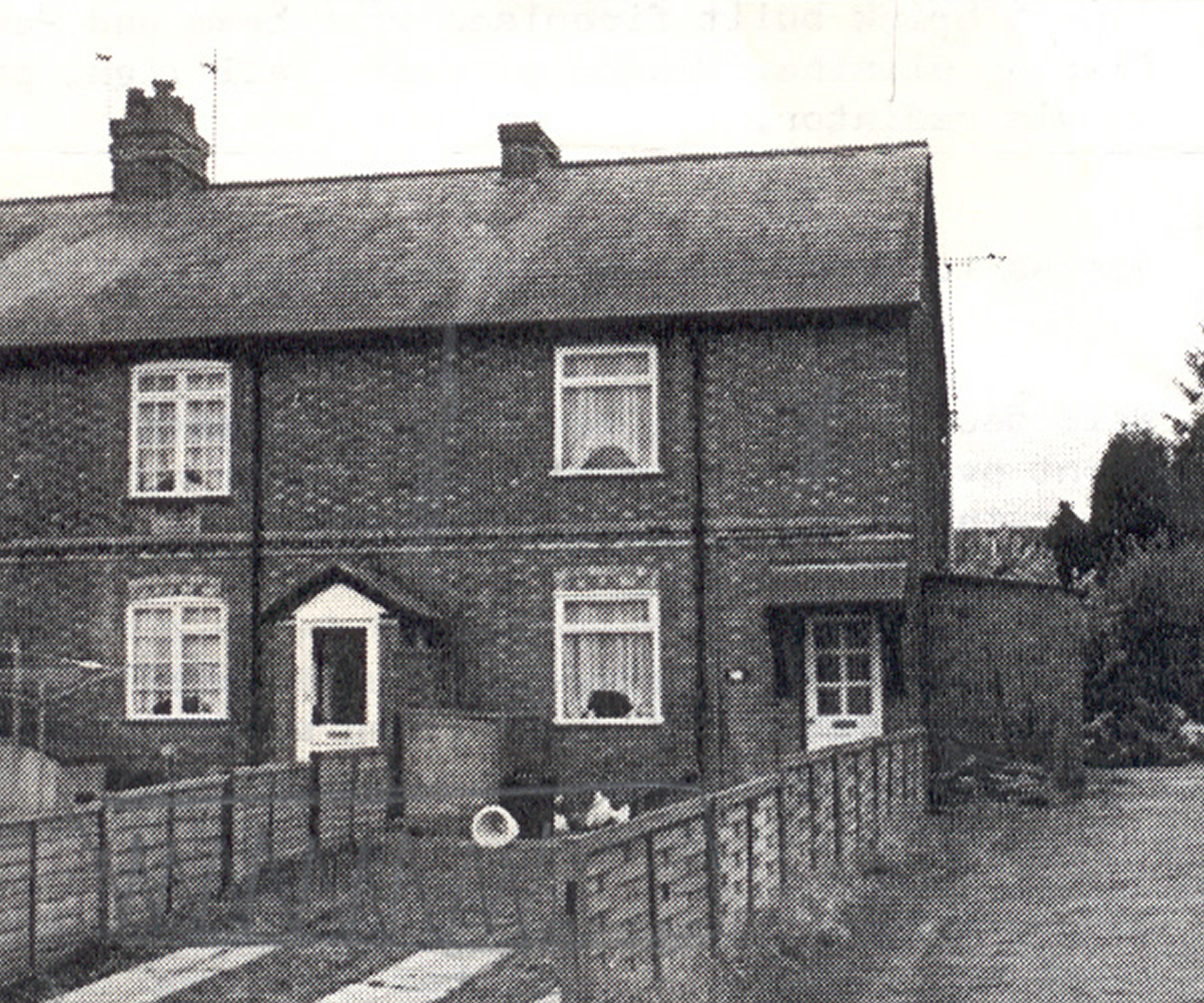
The Court - circa 1988

The Great Train Robbery took place at Bridego Railway Bridge (No. 127) on 8 August 1963, which is situated one mile (as the crow flies) from Slapton, heading towards Ledburn.

== Notable people ==
- Frank Bruno lives on the outskirts of the village.
