= Leighton Buzzard Golf Club =

Golf club in Bedfordshire, England

Coordinates: 51°56′20″N 0°39′44″W

Leighton Buzzard Golf Club is a golf club near the village of Heath and Reach, north of Leighton Buzzard in Bedfordshire, England. The club was founded in 1925 with a nine-hole golf course, that was later extended to eighteen holes. The present 11th hole, is a short steep downhill par three enclosed by overhanging trees with and an extremely undulating green. It formed part of the original nine-hole course and has been noted as one of the club's best-known holes. Golf writer and broadcaster Henry Longhurst described it as "an outstanding hole" and is reported to have rated Leighton Buzzard highly among nine-hole courses. The course has been ranked as one of the best in Bedfordshire.

Arthur Lacey was the club professional from 1927 to 1928. Ian Poulter was the assistant professional for several years before forging a career on the European Tour and the PGA Tour. He worked in the professional shop and gave junior golf lessons for £1 an hour. He was known for making the lessons fun and engaging. He worked alongside Phil Abbot under Head professional Lee Scarbrow.

An earlier club with a similar name, Leighton Buzzard and District Golf Club, was founded in September 1905. This club took over the course formerly used by Grovebury Golf Club, and ceased to exist around 1915.
