= Linslade =

Area of Leighton-Linslade, Bedfordshire, England

Coordinates: 51.9243°N 0.6774°W

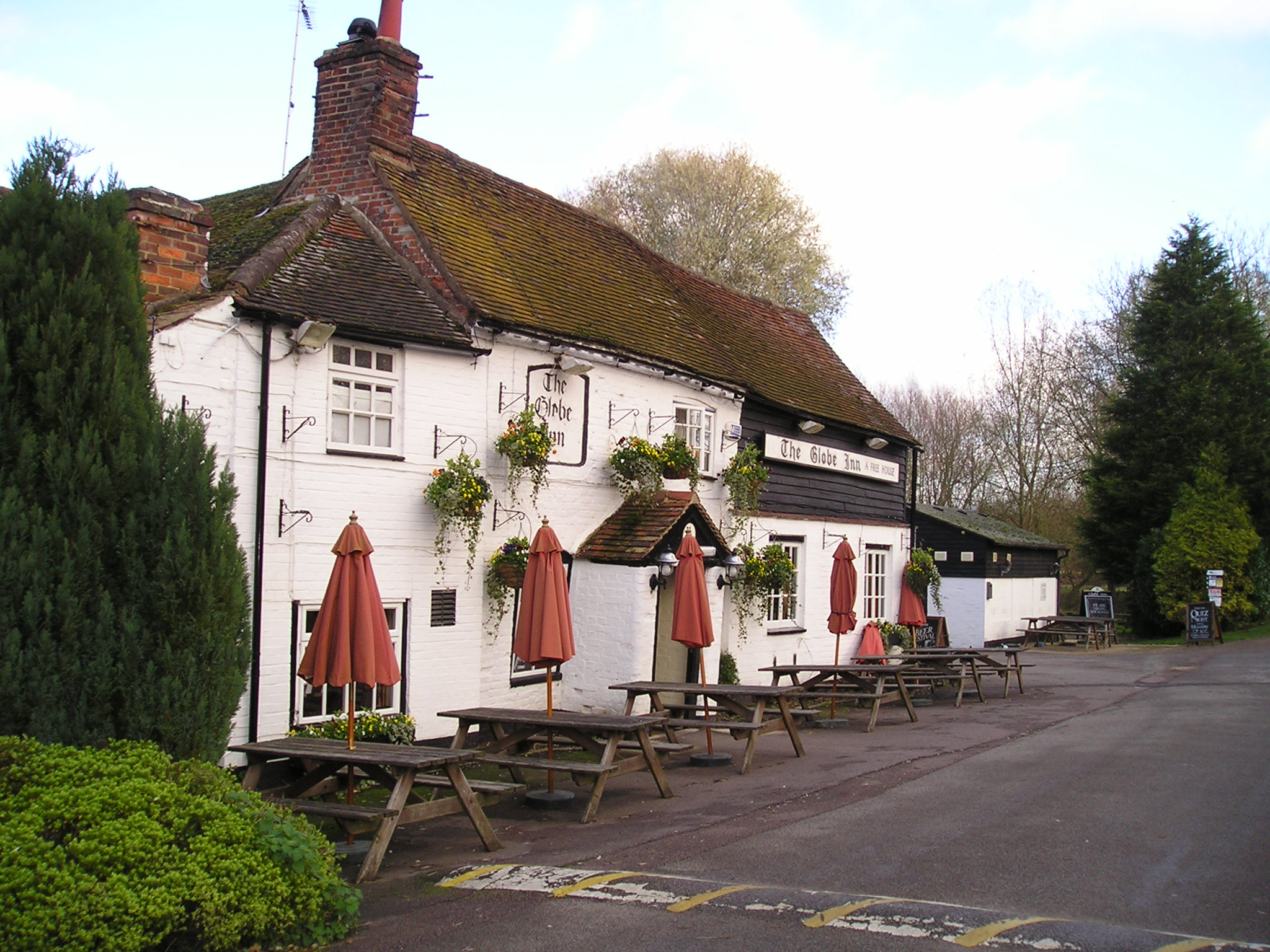
- The Globe Inn in Linslade

- Location within Bedfordshire
- Population: 11,185
- OS grid reference: SP910259
- Civil parish: Leighton-Linslade
- Unitary authority: Central Bedfordshire
- Ceremonial county: Bedfordshire
- Region: East
- Country: England
- Sovereign state: United Kingdom
- Post town: LEIGHTON BUZZARD
- Postcode district: LU7
- Dialling code: 01525
- Police: Bedfordshire
- Fire: Bedfordshire
- Ambulance: East of England
- UK Parliament: Dunstable and Leighton Buzzard

Linslade is an area in the civil parish of Leighton-Linslade, in the Central Bedfordshire unitary authority area of Bedfordshire, England. The original village was at Old Linslade on the banks of the River Ouzel. A new settlement called Linslade grew up a mile to the south of Old Linslade in the 19th century, particularly following the opening of Leighton Buzzard railway station there in 1838. Linslade now forms part of the urban area of Leighton Buzzard.

Linslade and Leighton Buzzard were administratively separate urban districts until 1965, when Linslade was transferred from Buckinghamshire to Bedfordshire and merged with Leighton Buzzard to become Leighton-Linslade. Linslade remained a part of the Diocese of Oxford until 2008 when it joined Leighton Buzzard in the Diocese of St Albans.

== Etymology ==
The name Linslade is Anglo Saxon in origin, and may mean "river crossing near a spring". (Though other plausible meanings exist.) The original form, recorded—for example—in the Anglo-Saxon Chronicle of 966, was Hlincgelad; then linchlade, pronounced lince-lade but by the time of the Domesday Book, in 1086, it had become Lincelada. The name continued to evolve, e.g. Lynchelade, in 1396, first appearing in its modern form in the 16th or 17th century, but with variations continuing into the 19th century.

== History ==
Archaeological findings show Roman-period remains around Bossington Lane/Stoke Road in Linslade.

=== Old Linslade ===
The earliest records of Linslade are of an Anglo-Saxon Manor, at the site of present-day Old Linslade, in 975 belonging to "Azelina", Ralph Tailbois' wife. The original Anglo-Saxon settlement of Linslade—prominent during the 13th century—was not located at the modern site, but was further north. It later became the hamlet of Old Linslade, superseding the original location of the 1840s. This transpired after massive growth associated with the construction of the Grand Union Canal and—particularly—the London and Birmingham Railway (now known as the West Coast Main Line). Linslade underwent a second major period of expansion, again associated with the railways, during the 1970s.

After the 1066 Norman Conquest, the manor was taken over by the de Beauchamp family. In 1251 a royal charter was granted to William de Beauchamp to hold a weekly market in Linslade, as well as a yearly 8-day fair. This grant was made on account of a Holy Well or Spring, located to the north of the village, which was a site of major pilgrimage. The holy well, which was a fabricated miracle to bring souls to the shrinking congregation of Old Linslade, was where the canal is sited today not far from the church.

In 1299, however, Oliver Sutton, Bishop of Lincoln, warned pilgrims off by threatening those who did not desist with excommunication. His reason for this is either that the well was unconsecrated or that the miracles being attested to happen at the well were in fact fraudulent. The vicar of Linslade—who did not dissuade the pilgrimages from visiting the spring because of the offerings they made—was forced to appear at the bishop's court.

Without the pilgrims, the importance of Linslade declined. But in the 15th century, the original 12th-century church, dedicated to St Mary the Virgin, was rebuilt.

=== Chelsea New Town or New Linslade ===
At the beginning of the 19th century the parish population was 203, but in 1805 the Grand Union Canal was opened on the Linslade side of the River Ouzel, and in 1838 the London and Birmingham Railway (later the West Coast Main Line) was built running roughly parallel to the canal. Leighton Buzzard railway station opened with the railway in 1838, and stood in what was then open countryside in the parish of Linslade, but was built to serve the neighbouring town on the other side of the river.

The area between the station and canal was then rapidly developed. The new development was initially known as Chelsea New Town or New Linslade, and it lined the streets leading towards the bridges across the canal and River Ouzel into Leighton Buzzard. New Linslade quickly overtook the original village of Linslade a mile to the north to become the largest settlement in the parish. The original village subsequently became known as Old Linslade, and in time New Linslade became known simply as Linslade. Linslade was never its own post town, always having Leighton Buzzard addresses, despite being administratively separate.

By 1840 the parish of Linslade had 869 residents. This prompted the vicar of Linslade, the Rev. B. Perkins, to set about fundraising for a school for the parish's poor, and a church for the New Town. Fundraising for the church was only completed by the Rev. Perkin's successor, Rev. Peter Thomas Ouvry; and its completion in 1849 marks the point that the New Town had become Linslade.

=== Bideford Green ===
From the 1840s, Linslade grew steadily, although the population dipped during the two world wars. At the end of the 1960s a sustained period of development began which saw major housing estates added, so that by the end of the 1970s Linslade had over doubled in size.

=== Merger with Leighton Buzzard ===
In 1961 the parish and urban district of Linslade had a population of 4,139. On 1 April 1965 the parish was merged with Leighton Buzzard to form "Leighton-Linslade". There was a minor adjustment (19 acres) to the boundary with neighbouring Soulbury at the same time.

In administrative terms, Linslade and Leighton Buzzard have been administered together as Leighton-Linslade since 1965. The Office for National Statistics uses the name Leighton Buzzard for the whole built-up area, including Linslade.

== Governance ==
There are two tiers of local government covering Linslade, at civil parish (town) and unitary authority level: Leighton-Linslade Town Council and Central Bedfordshire Council. The town council is based at the White House on Hockliffe Street in Leighton Buzzard.

=== Administrative history ===
Linslade was an ancient parish in the Cottesloe Hundred of Buckinghamshire.

When parish and district councils were created under the Local Government Act 1894, Linslade was given a parish council and included in the Linslade Rural District, created from the parts of the Leighton Buzzard Rural Sanitary District and Berkhamsted Rural Sanitary District which were in Buckinghamshire. Shortly after the new districts were established, the process began for making the parish its own urban district, which came into effect on 1 October 1897, with Linslade Urban District Council replacing the parish council. Linslade Rural District was renamed at the same time, becoming Wing Rural District.

From 1912 until its abolition in 1965, Linslade Urban District Council was based at 6 Leighton Road.

Linslade Urban District was abolished in 1965, when the area was transferred to Bedfordshire and merged with Leighton Buzzard Urban District to become Leighton-Linslade Urban District. Leighton-Linslade Urban District only existed for nine years; it was abolished in 1974 under the Local Government Act 1972. District-level functions passed to South Bedfordshire District Council, which in turn was replaced by the unitary Central Bedfordshire Council in 2009, which also took over the functions of the abolished Bedfordshire County Council. A successor parish covering the abolished urban district of Leighton-Linslade was created in 1974, with its council taking the name Leighton-Linslade Town Council.

== Amenities ==
The expansion of Linslade during the 1970s added more amenities. The principal Leighton-Linslade facilities within Linslade are Tiddenfoot Leisure Centre, which includes a swimming pool and indoor sports courts; Leighton Buzzard Golf Club and Leighton Buzzard railway station.

=== Commercial ===
Linslade has no high street. There are some small shops clustered around the junction of Wing Road, Stoke Road and Old Road, but signposts in that area marked "town centre" point towards the town centre of Leighton Buzzard on the east side of the River Ouzel.

=== Education ===
Bedfordshire operates a three-tier education system, with lower, middle and upper schools. Linslade has three lower schools (Linslade Lower, Southcott Lower, and Greenleas Lower). The middle school (Linslade School) and upper school (The Cedars) are located opposite each other on Mentmore Road.

=== Schools ===
- Linslade Lower School
- Southcott Lower School
- Greenleas Lower School
- Linslade School (Middle)
- Cedars Upper School

=== Community facilities ===
The 1970s expansion added one community centre on Bideford Green, run by a Residents Association; this includes a small bar. This can be hired out for public use, and is used for dance lessons, Zumba and martial arts, as well as a polling station. Dance classes can also be taken at another community centre – the Forster Institute; and the Leanne Hughes dance school next to the station. Linslade Parish Hall (St Barnabas' Church Hall – a school until 1961) is used by many Leighton-Linslade organisations, including Tai Chi groups. Nyamba Scout Hut is home to 1st Linslade Scouts and Guides, as well as playgroups.

=== Parks and playgrounds ===
Linslade has two play areas and parks at Mentmore Road on the way to Cedars School and St Barnabas opposite the railway station. Linslade has two semi-wild park areas. Linslade Wood (colloquially called Bluebell Wood) is a mature woodland dating back to at least the 16th century. Tiddenfoot Pit, a former quarry, turned into a lake and wildlife area. Both are managed by Greensands Trust. Stockgrove Country Park and Rushmere Country Park are nearby.

=== Sport ===
As well as being home to several junior football teams, Linslade is represented at senior level by local 5-a-side team, Sporting Linslade. Sporting Linslade are the current Division 3 champions, their only domestic trophy to date. Sporting Linslade were chosen as the 5-a-side team of the year in the national Carling One-All Awards 2009.

== Notable inhabitants ==
Notable people from Linslade include:

- Ciara Janson, Hollyoaks actress who portrays Nicole Owen.
- Tom Wise, the former Member of the European Parliament for the East of England jailed for expenses fraud lives in Linslade
- Russell Stannard, author of several children's book and books on science and religion, and emeritus professor of physics at the Open University.
- Louise Dearman, actress who has played the role of both Elphaba and Glinda, the first person in the world to do so, in the West End musical Wicked.

== See also ==
- Southcote, Bedfordshire
- Cheddington
