= Old Town Hall, Leighton Buzzard =

Municipal building in Leighton Buzzard, Bedfordshire, England

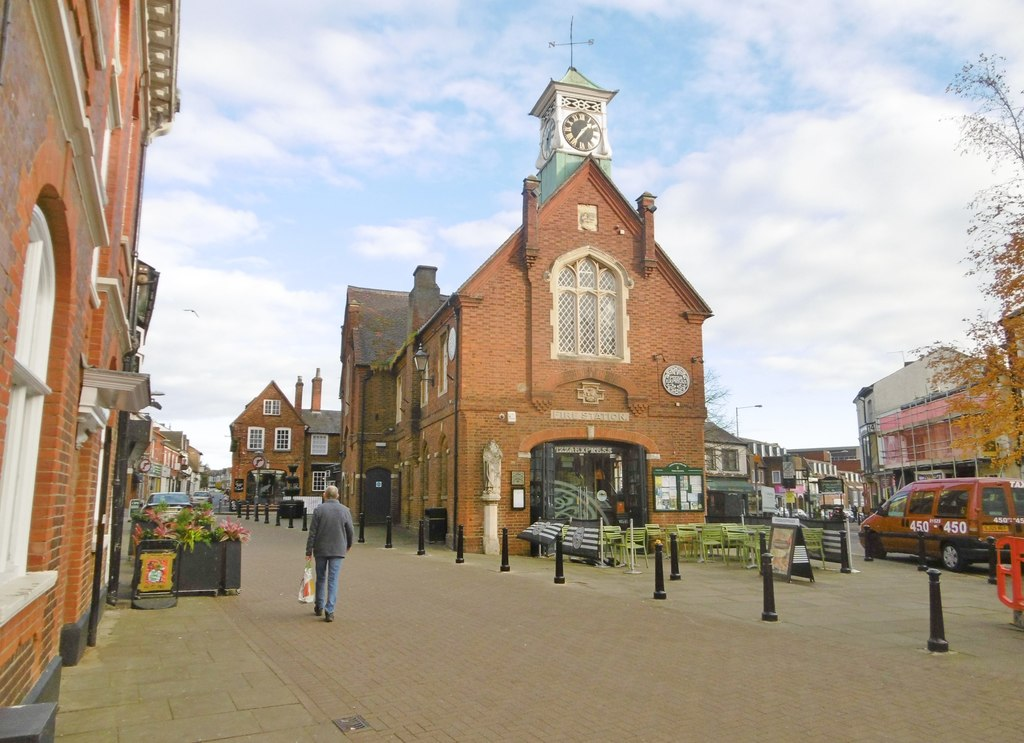
- Old Town Hall, Leighton Buzzard

- Shown in Bedfordshire
- 51.9165°N 0.6611°W
- Location: Market Square, Leighton Buzzard

History
- Built: 1851

Site notes
- Architectural style: Neoclassical style

Listed Building – Grade II
- Official name: Fire Station, Market Square (South Island Site)
- Designated: 1 May 1975
- Reference no.: 1114566

The Old Town Hall is a municipal building in the Market Square, Leighton Buzzard, Bedfordshire, England. The town hall, which is currently used as a restaurant, is a Grade II listed building.

== History ==
The first municipal building in the town was a timber-framed market hall which dated back to the 16th century. It was arcaded on the ground floor, so that markets could be held, with an assembly room known as the "jury loft", which was used for petty session hearings, on the first floor. The building had a clock on the gable at the west end and was surmounted by a bell tower. It was owned by the lord of the manor, who, in the 16th century, was Sir Christopher Hoddesdon, master of the Company of Merchant Adventurers: it subsequently passed through inheritance to Lord Leigh of Stoneleigh Abbey and his successors.

After the old market hall became dilapidated in the mid-19th century, the then lord of the manor, Lieutenant-Colonel Henry Hanmer, decided to commission a new structure. The new building was designed in the neoclassical style, built in red brick with stone dressings at a cost of £1,182 and was completed in 1851. The design involved a broadly symmetrical main frontage with a single bay facing west along the High Street; there were originally two round headed doorways on the ground floor, a three-light mullioned and transomed window on the first floor and a gable above. On the south elevation there were seven bays which were fenestrated with arched windows with brick archivolts and keystones on the ground floor and with arched windows with stone architraves on the first floor. At roof level there was a small clock tower and a weather vane. The ground floor continued to be used as a venue for markets and the first floor continued to serve as a courtroom.

Following the formation of a Local Government District for the area in July 1891, the new Local Board held its meetings in the building, which became known as the town hall. However, in March 1892, the board started to use the Corn Exchange on Lake Street instead. In 1894, the area was advanced to the status of urban district and, in 1897, Joseph Truman Mills, became lord of the manor. In February 1914, just before the start of the First World War, the town hall became the temporary home of a detachment of B Company, the 5th (Territorial) Battalion, The Bedfordshire Regiment, and, in 1918, Mills agreed to sell the building to the Leighton Buzzard Urban District Council for use as a fire station.

The fire service moved to a new fire station in Lake Street in 1963. The building was subsequently refurbished and made available for community use until 2008, when the then local authority for the area, South Bedfordshire District Council, decided to let the building for commercial use: it was subsequently converted into a restaurant, initially under the ASK brand, and since 2014, as a PizzaExpress outlet. A Shand Mason fire engine, of the type previously used by the local fire service, was placed in the restaurant on public display.
