= Stockgrove Country Park =

Country park in England

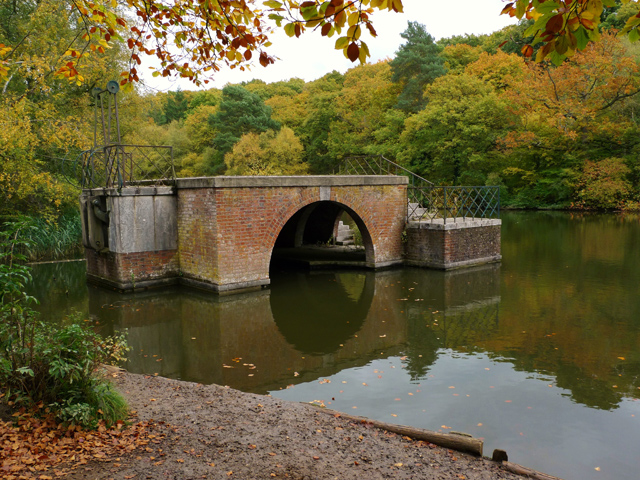
- Interactive map of Stockgrove Country Park
- Type: country park
- Location: Heath and Reach, Bedfordshire, England
- Coordinates: 51.953°N 0.666°W
- Operator: Greensand Trust
- Status: Open all year

Stockgrove Country Park is located in England on the Bedfordshire/Buckinghamshire border in the parish of Heath and Reach. Stockgrove Park's 80 acres is part of the larger 400 acre woods called Rushmere Country Park, managed by the Greensand Trust. The Greensand Trust manages this area comprising Rushmere (200 acres), Stockgrove (80 acres), Oak Wood (100 acres) and Rammamere and parts of Kings Wood. Stockgrove was opened to the public in 1972 and Rushmere is the newest addition to the Estate, opened in 2011. The largest of the lakes features the remains of a boathouse that burned down in 1963 – only its brick arches are left. Mandarin ducks took up residence in 1997 and have bred there ever since. The park is partly in the Kings and Bakers Woods and Heaths Site of Special Scientific Interest.

== Stockgrove Estate ==
The park was originally part of the Stockgrove Estate based at a house in the Buckinghamshire parish of Soulbury. Edwin Hanmer bought the Stock Grove Farm estate in 1792, and the family enlarged the estate by buying Bragenham Manor in 1852. The politician Henry Hanmer lived at Stockgrove Park. From 1928 to 1949 the estate was owned by Sir Michael Kroyer-Kielberg (1882–1958). He commissioned the architect William Curtis Green to design and build a new house, and re-landscaped the parkland. During the Second World War the estate was used by the Army. From the 1950s the house was used as a school for children with special educational needs, run first by London County Council, then by the Inner London Education Authority, and finally by the London Borough of Camden until the school closed in 1994.

In 1971 the parkland was jointly purchased by the Bedfordshire and Buckinghamshire County Councils. The park was opened to the public in 1972, and it was extended in 1973.
