= King's Wood, Heath and Reach =

Woodland in Bedfordshire, England

Coordinates: 51.9591°N 0.6517°W

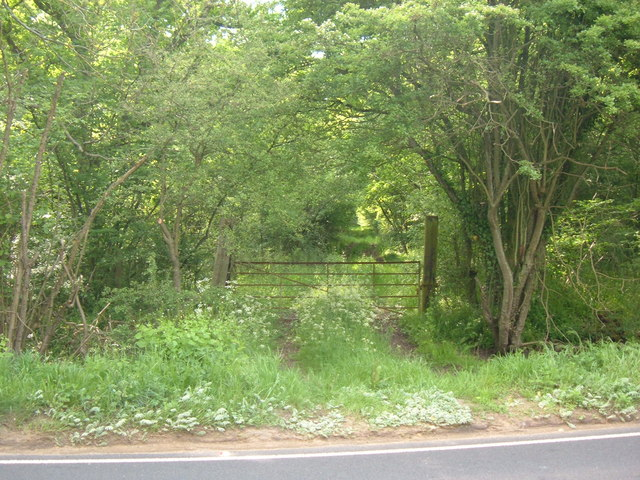

King's Wood is an area of ancient woodland in the parish of Heath and Reach in Bedfordshire, England. The wood lies north of the village of Heath and Reach and east of Great Brickhill and with neighboring Bakers Wood forms the largest area of ancient woodland in Bedfordshire. Much of the wood lies within Kings Wood and Rushmere National Nature Reserve, jointly owned and managed by the Greensand Trust, Wildlife Trust for Bedfordshire, Cambridgeshire and Northamptonshire, Central Bedfordshire Council and Tarmac Aggregates. Kings Wood and many parts of the National Nature Reserve are part of a Site of Special Scientific Interest named Kings and Bakers Woods and Heaths, which also includes Rammamere Heath in Buckinghamshire and Shire Oak Heath in Bedfordshire.

== See also ==
- List of Sites of Special Scientific Interest in Bedfordshire
- List of Sites of Special Scientific Interest in Buckinghamshire
- List of ancient woods in England
- National nature reserves in Bedfordshire
