= Ivinghoe =

Historic market town and civil parish in Buckinghamshire, England

Coordinates: 51.836384°N 0.626118°W

- Town and civil parish
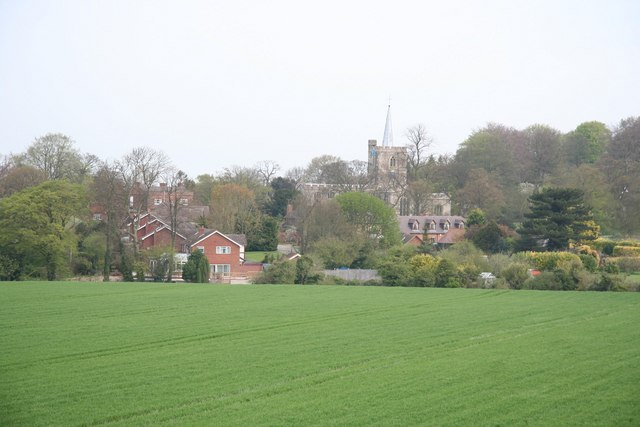
- Ivinghoe

- Location within Buckinghamshire
- Population: 965 (2011)
- OS grid reference: SP946162
- Civil parish: Ivinghoe
- Unitary authority: Buckinghamshire
- Ceremonial county: Buckinghamshire
- Region: South East
- Country: England
- Sovereign state: United Kingdom
- Post town: LEIGHTON BUZZARD
- Postcode district: LU7
- Dialling code: 01296
- Police: Thames Valley
- Fire: Buckinghamshire
- Ambulance: South Central
- UK Parliament: Aylesbury

Ivinghoe is a historic market town and civil parish in east Buckinghamshire, England, close to the borders with Hertfordshire and Bedfordshire. It is 33 miles (53 kilometres) northwest of London, 4 mi (6 km) north of Tring and 6 mi (10 km) south of Leighton Buzzard, close to the village of Pitstone.

== Etymology ==
The town name is Anglo-Saxon in origin, and means 'Ifa's hill-spur'. The same name is found in Ivington (He) and its strong form in Iveston and Ivesley (Du). The term "hoh" ('projecting ridge of land, a promontory' similar to German Höhe) refers probably to Ivinghoe Beacon. Allen Mawer notes that Ivinghoe is located "at the base of a considerable spur of land jutting out from the main range of the Chilterns". In the Domesday Book of 1086 it was recorded as Evinghehou. Other forms: Iuingeho, Hythingho, Yvyngho (xii–xiii cent.); Ivanhoe (xvii cent.)

=== Ivinghoe and Ivanhoe ===
Ivanhoe is an alternative form of Ivinghoe. It is the inspiration for the title of Walter Scott's most famous novel. Ivanhoe is the feudal title of Wilfred of Ivanhoe. In the novel, Richard Coeur de Lion gives Wilfred the investiture of the Lordship of the Manor (Fief) of Ivanhoe.

Scott took the name from an old rhyme (Tring, Wing and Ivanhoe, For striking of a blow, Hampden did forego, And glad he could escape so ..”). The form "Ivanhoe" is recorded in the Hertfordshire county sessions records for 1665. Until the creation of the Ordnance Survey in the mid 19th century many place names remained uncertain and varied. They often depended on local use and how they might have been written in various documents over time. Prof. Paul Kerswill (a linguistics specialist) writes in a private letter to Dr. Marco Paret (Lord of the Manor of Ivinghoe), that "it is very likely that older, rural people in the Ivinghoe area would have pronounced the name in the same way as Ivanhoe, also dropping the h. Something like 'ivanoe'. the suffix -ing is pronounced 'in' in most dialects in the English-speaking world - and has been for many centuries." Sir Walter Scott most likely knew Ivinghoe directly. He stayed at “Stocks" in Berkhamsted for a short time. Berkhamsted is 8 miles (13 kilometres) from Ivinghoe.

== Location ==
Ivinghoe is situated within the Chiltern Hills, on the edge of the Chilterns' Area of Outstanding Natural Beauty. Ivinghoe is an important point on the Icknield Way, joining the Upper Icknield and Lower Icknield together. The Icknield Way is claimed to be the oldest road in Britain, dating back to the Celtic period, though this has been disputed. Today the village is known as a starting point on The Ridgeway, a popular route for hikers and cyclists which uses part of the Icknield Way, running for 87 miles (140 kilometres) to Overton Hill in Wiltshire.

Ivinghoe Aston is a hamlet within the parish of Ivinghoe. Its name refers to a farm to the east of the town. The hamlet has four farms, several houses and a public house, The Village Swan, which was bought by local residents in 1997.

A small stream called Whistle Brook flows down through the hamlet, from the Chilterns above, to join the River Ouzel at nearby Slapton.

Other hamlets close to Ivinghoe are Ford End and Great Gap.

== Buildings ==
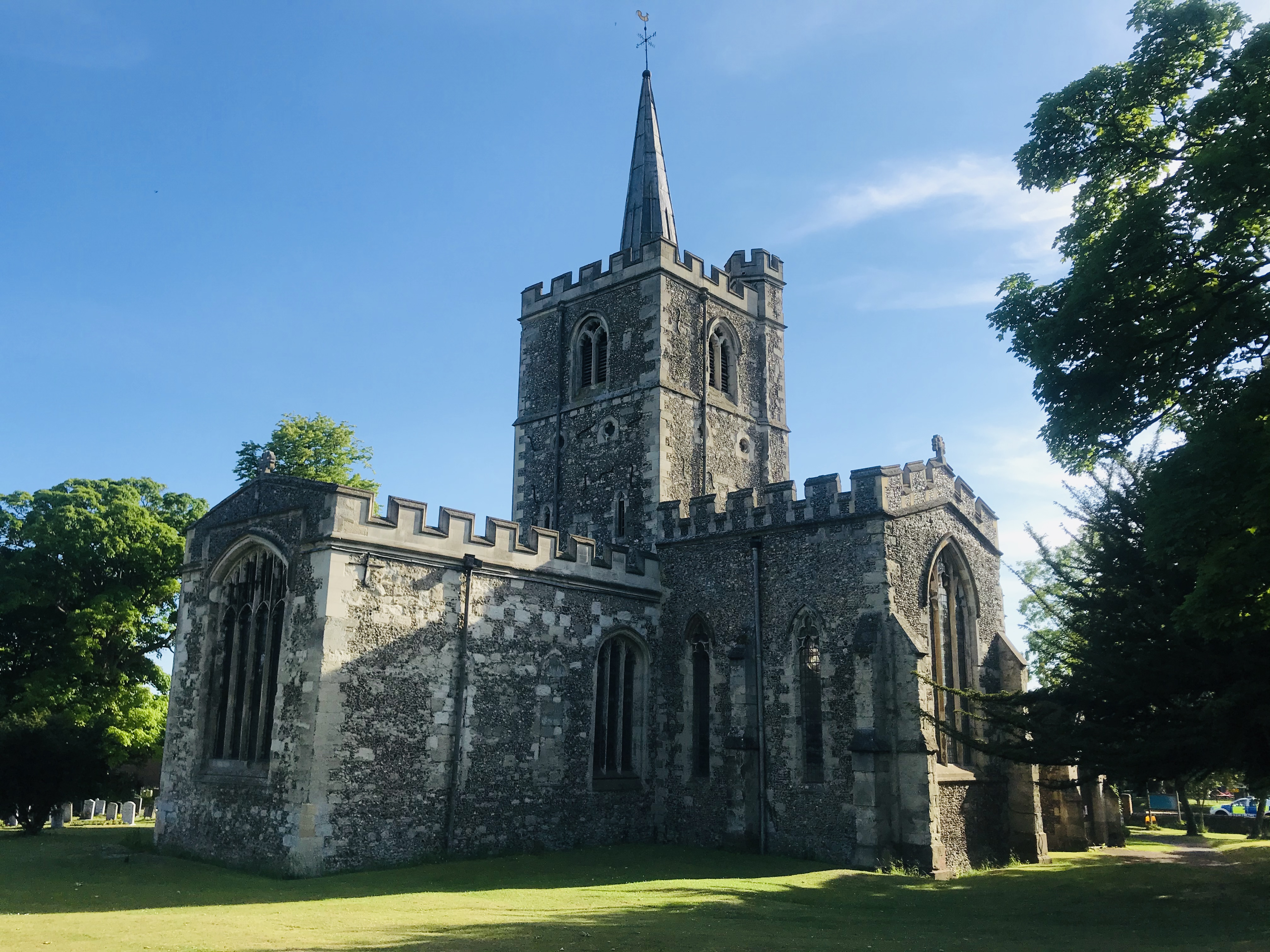
St Mary's Church, Ivinghoe, from the north-east

The Church of St Mary the Virgin, Ivinghoe dates from 1220 but was set on fire in 1234 in an act of spite against the local Bishop. The church was rebuilt in 1241.

The town has some fine examples of Tudor architecture, particularly around the village green, with 28 buildings marked as listed or significant.

Ivinghoe Beacon, near the town, is an ancient beacon, or signal point, which was used in times of crisis to send messages across the country and is now popular with walkers who just want to get exercise and see the view. It is used as a site for flying model aeroplanes. The hill is the site of an early Iron Age hill fort which, during excavations in the 1960s, was identified from bronzework finds to date back to the Bronze-Iron transition period between 800 and 700 BC. Like many other similar hill forts in the Chilterns it is thought to have been occupied for only a short period, possibly less than one generation.

Nearby is Pitstone Windmill, the oldest windmill in Britain that can be dated, which is owned by the National Trust.

The population of Ivinghoe in 1841 was 740.

== Lords of the Manor ==
The manor of Ivinghoe belonged before the Norman Conquest to the demesne of the church of St Peter of Winchester, and at the time of the Domesday Survey it was still held by the bishop, being assessed for 20 hides and valued at £18. It is listed in the Domesday Book of 1086 as “Evinghehou”.

Succeeding bishops held the manor until the reign of Henry VIII. Lords included William Giffard, Henry of Blois, Godfrey de Luci, John Gervais, Nicholas of Ely, John of Pontoise, John de Stratford, Cardinal Henry Beaufort, William Waynflete, and Richard Foxe. In 1531 William Cholmeley was appointed to be bailiff of Ivinghoe, which had come into the king's hands by the forfeiture of Cardinal Thomas Wolsey, who was Bishop of Winchester. It was, however, restored to the bishopric almost at once to Bishop Stephen Gardiner, and so remained until in 1551, when John Poynet, bishop, surrendered it to the King. In the following month Edward VI made a grant in fee of the manor to Sir John Mason (diplomat), kt., and Elizabeth his wife.

After the death of Edward VI and the flight of Poynet, Ivinghoe, with other episcopal manors, was regranted to the see of Winchester, but was again taken by the Crown at the accession of Elizabeth, the grant to Mason apparently holding good, passing to his son Anthony.

The Egerton Family and Ivinghoe

Anthony Mason held the manor in 1582 and in 1586 alienated the manor to Charles Glenham who sold it in 1589 to Lady Jane Cheyne, widow of Henry Lord Cheyne. In 1603 she conveyed the manor to Ralph Crewe, Thomas Chamberlayn and Richard Cartwright, trustees for the Egertons, and Sir Thomas Egerton, 1st Viscount Brackley, and Sir John Egerton, 1st Earl of Bridgewater, his son and heir, received Ivinghoe from the trustees in 1604.

Lord Ellesmere, who also bore the title of Viscount Brackley, died seised of the manor in 1617. In the same year his son was created Earl of Bridgewater and the manor descended with this title until the latter became extinct in 1829.

By the will of the seventh earl, who died in 1823, the estates were then held by his widow until her death in 1849, when they devolved upon his great-nephew John Egerton, Viscount Alford, father of the second Earl Brownlow, from whom the title and lands descended to the Barons Brownlow. The sixth Baron, notably served as a Lord-in-waiting to the Prince of Wales (later King Edward VIII), as Mayor of Grantham, as Parliamentary Private Secretary to the Minister of Aircraft Production Lord Beaverbrook and as Lord Lieutenant of Lincolnshire. His son, the seventh Baron Brownlow was the last of the direct Egerton line to have hold the Manor of Ivinghoe. Actual Lord of the Manor is Dr. Marco Paret that succeeded to an Egerton descendent. The Lord of the Manor has still the right to hold the customary Courts Baron and Court Leet as permitted by Administration of Justice Act 1977.

== In popular culture ==
Scenes for feature films, such as Quatermass 2, Batman Begins, Maleficent, The Dirty Dozen, Harry Potter and the Goblet of Fire, Star Wars: The Rise of Skywalker as well as the BBC America production Killing Eve, have been shot at Ivinghoe Beacon. Director Raymond Austin filmed the 1960s-1970's TV shows The Avengers, The New Avengers and The Saint in and around the village, which once also served as a set for the children's TV series ChuckleVision. Parts of Wicked and Wicked: For Good were shot in Ivinghoe, depicitng Munchkinland and Shiz University.

== Schools ==
Brookmead School is a mixed, foundation primary school in Ivinghoe. It takes children from the ages of four to eleven. The school has about 300 pupils.
