= Hector Shand =

Scottish footballer

Personal information
- Full name: Hector MacKenzie Shand
- Date of birth: 1 May 1879
- Place of birth: Inverness, Scotland
- Date of death: 1942 (aged 62–63)
- Place of death: Middlesex, England
- Height: 5 ft 8 in (1.73 m)
- Position: Outside right

Youth career
- Citadel

Senior career*
Years	Team	Apps	(Gls)
- Inverness Thistle
1905	Southampton	1	(0)
1905–1906	Inverness Thistle		
1906–1907	Middlesbrough	2	(0)
1907–1909	Millwall Athletic		
- * Club domestic league appearances and goals

Hector MacKenzie Shand (1 May 1879 – 1942) was a Scottish professional footballer who played as an outside-forward for Inverness Thistle in Scotland and for Southampton, Middlesbrough and Millwall Athletic in England in the 1900s.

== Football career ==
Shand was born in Inverness and played his youth football with Citadel F.C. before joining Inverness Thistle. In 1905, he played in a trial match for Partick Thistle, scoring the only goal against Port Glasgow in a match to raise funds for the local Masonic Lodge.

In April 1905, he moved to the south coast of England to join Southampton who were having trouble filling the outside-left berth in an unsettled season, having won the title in each of the previous two years. The "Saints" had alternated between Charles Webb and Archie Turner at outside-left for most of the season, although Fred Mouncher and the veteran Jimmy Yates had both been tried there in the last six weeks of the season. Shand made his only first-team appearance for Southampton in the last match of the season, a 1–0 defeat at home to Queens Park Rangers on 29 April 1905, the Saints' fourth defeat in the final five matches of the season, which left them in third place, five points behind champions, Bristol Rovers.

With Southampton having signed Isaac Tomlinson to fill the outside-left position, Shand was unable to settle in southern England and returned to Scotland in the summer of 1905, to resume playing for Inverness Thistle.

He returned to England in August 1906, when he joined Middlesbrough of the Football League First Division for whom he made just two league appearances, before returning to the Southern League with Millwall Athletic in May 1907.
