= Leighton–Linslade =

Leighton-Linslade
- Civil parish
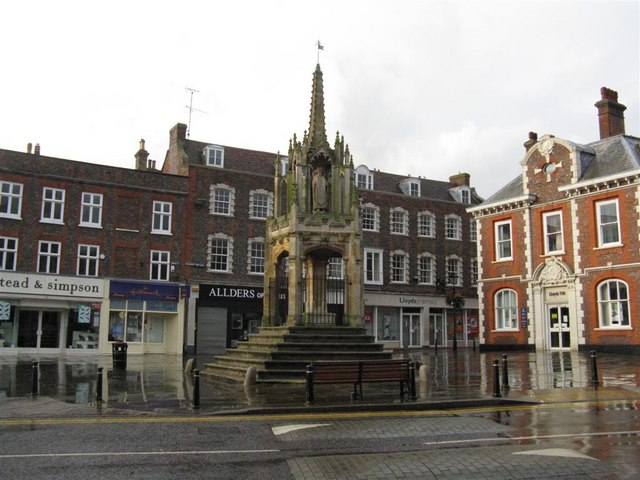
- Leighton Buzzard
- Interactive map of Leighton-Linslade
- Coordinates: 51.916°N 0.668°W
- Country: England
- Primary council: Central Bedfordshire
- County: Bedfordshire
- Region: East of England
- Status: Parish
- Main settlements: Leighton Buzzard; Linslade

Government
  - Type: Town Council
  - UK Parliament: South West Bedfordshire

Population (2011)
  - Total: 37,469
- Postal code: LU7
- Area code: LU
- Website: Leighton-Linslade Town Council

Leighton–Linslade is a civil parish in the district of Central Bedfordshire in Bedfordshire, England. It was formed in 1965 as a merger of Leighton Buzzard and Linslade, which prior to 1965 had been administratively separate urban districts. They had also been in separate counties, with Leighton Buzzard being in Bedfordshire, but Linslade in Buckinghamshire. By 1965, the two settlements had grown into one built-up area, with Leighton Buzzard on the east side of the River Ouzel (a narrow stream at this point) and Linslade opposite it on the west side.

Between 1965 and 1974 Leighton–Linslade was an urban district, with its council performing district-level functions. Since 1974 the parish has had a town council performing parish-level functions. The name Leighton–Linslade is generally only used in a local government context as the name of the parish and its town council. The built-up area is called Leighton Buzzard, which name is also used for postal addresses across the built-up area, including in Linslade.

The parish had a population of 37,469 at the 2011 Census.

== History ==
Leighton-Linslade
- Urban District
- Population
  - 1971: 20,140
- History
  - Created: 1 April 1965
  - Abolished: 31 March 1974
  - Succeeded by: South Bedfordshire
  - HQ: Leighton Buzzard
- Contained within
  - County Council: Bedfordshire
- Map of boundary as of 1971

Leighton Buzzard was the older settlement, being an ancient market town. The town centre and parish church lay immediately east of a bridge over the River Ouzel; the river was the parish and county boundary with Linslade in Buckinghamshire. The original village of Linslade was at what is now called Old Linslade, over a mile north from the bridge into Leighton Buzzard.

Following the completion of the Grand Junction Canal in 1800 and the opening of the London and Birmingham Railway in 1838, the area west of the River Ouzel between the canal and Leighton Buzzard railway station (both of which were in the parish of Linslade) began to be developed. Being in the parish of Linslade, the new development came to be known as Linslade, although when first laid out it was also known as Chelsea or New Linslade.

The parish of Leighton Buzzard was made a local government district in 1891; such districts were converted into urban districts in 1894. The parish of Linslade was made an urban district in 1897.

Leighton–Linslade Urban District was created on 1 April 1965 as a merger of Leighton Buzzard Urban District in Bedfordshire and Linslade Urban District in Buckinghamshire. The new urban district was placed entirely in Bedfordshire, thereby transferring Linslade from Buckinghamshire to Bedfordshire. The parishes of Leighton Buzzard and Linslade were merged into a single parish of Leighton–Linslade covering the same area as the urban district; as an urban parish it had no separate parish council.

Leighton–Linslade Urban District was abolished in 1974 under the Local Government Act 1972. District-level functions passed to the new South Bedfordshire District Council. A successor parish covering the area of the former urban district was created, with its council taking the name 'Leighton–Linslade Town Council'. Local government in Bedfordshire was reformed again in 2009 when South Bedfordshire was abolished and Central Bedfordshire Council was created, also taking over the functions of the abolished Bedfordshire County Council. Leighton–Linslade Town Council continues to function as a parish-level authority.

== Geography ==
It consists of the settlements of Leighton Buzzard and Linslade, which have a single town council. The River Ouzel provides the border between the parts, with Leighton Buzzard to the east and Linslade to the west. The two are served by Leighton Buzzard railway station, which is actually on the western side.

== Governance ==
The local council is Leighton–Linslade Town Council.

Leighton–Linslade is recognised as a Cycling town by Cycling England, from whom it receives funding to promote cycle use.

The parish participates in international town twinning:

- Coulommiers (France)
- Titisee-Neustadt, (Germany) – since 1991

== Premises ==
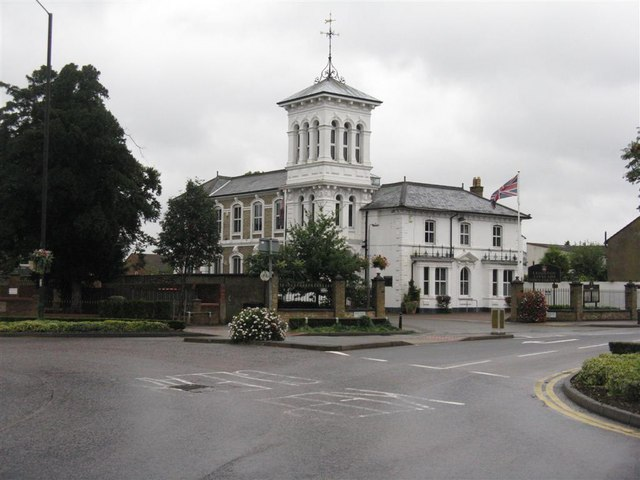
White House, 37 Hockliffe Street, Leighton Buzzard

The Leighton–Linslade Urban District Council created in 1965 inherited offices at 6 Leighton Road in Linslade from Linslade Urban District Council and at the White House, 37 Hockliffe Street in Leighton Buzzard from Leighton Buzzard Urban District Council. The White House was used as the urban district council's main offices throughout its existence. The White House now serves as the offices of Leighton–Linslade Town Council.

== Arms ==
Leighton–Linslade Urban District Council was granted a coat of arms on 5 January 1966, less than a year after the council's creation. The arms were transferred to Leighton–Linslade Town Council following local government reorganisation in 1974.

Coat of arms of Leighton–Linslade
Crest On a wreath of the colours a water ouzel displayed Proper perched upon two cog-wheels Or each issuant from a mural crown Argent. Escutcheon Quarterly Or and Gules a single-arched bridge throughout Argent masoned Sable the keystone charged with an ear of wheat Proper the whole between in chief two celestial crowns and in base a lily plant of three flowers counterchanged. Motto By Truth And Diligence.

== Freedom of the Town ==
The following people and military units have received the Freedom of the Town of Leighton–Linslade.

=== Individuals ===
- Walter "Wally" Randall: 10 November 2019.

=== Military Units ===
- RAF Stanbridge: 27 April 1987.
- 1003 (Leighton Buzzard) Squadron Air Training Corps: 29 January 2001.
