= John Shand Kydd =

British photographer (born 1959)

John "Johnnie" Shand Kydd (born 1959) is a British photographer. He is the youngest son of Peter Shand Kydd and Janet Munro Kerr. Kydd has exhibited at the National Portrait Gallery in London.

== Life and work ==
Shand Kydd studied art (and English) at Exeter University, but said that, by then, he had done enough painting to know that he did not want to pursue it, "There's so much crap art around and what's the point of being a mediocre artist?"

His most recent publication and photographic exhibition, Siren City (2010), is the result of eight years of photographic research in Naples, a place defined by Shand Kydd as one of the most radical cities in Europe.

== Publications ==
- Spit Fire: Photographs from the Art World, Thames & Hudson in association with Violette Editions, London, 1996/97
- Crash, Damiani, 2006
- Siren City, Other Criteria, London, 2009
- Ramsholt, Cheerio, 2026
