= Heath and Reach =

Village in Bedfordshire, England

Coordinates: 51.9430°N 0.6555°W

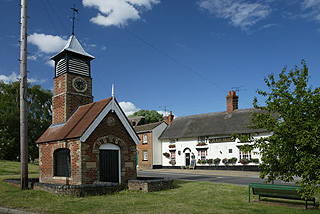
- Heath Green with pump house and Duke's Head public house

- Location within Bedfordshire
- Interactive map of Heath and Reach
- Population: 1,451 (parish)
- OS grid reference: SP925280
- Unitary authority: Central Bedfordshire
- Ceremonial county: Bedfordshire
- Region: East
- Country: England
- Sovereign state: United Kingdom
- Post town: LEIGHTON BUZZARD
- Postcode district: LU7
- Dialling code: 01525
- Police: Bedfordshire
- Fire: Bedfordshire
- Ambulance: East of England
- UK Parliament: Dunstable and Leighton Buzzard

Heath and Reach is a village and civil parish near the Chiltern Hills in Bedfordshire, England. It is 2 miles (3.2 km) north of Leighton Buzzard and 3 miles (4.8 km) south of Woburn and adjoins the county boundary with Buckinghamshire. Nearby places are Leighton-Linslade, Great Brickhill and the Duke of Bedford's Woburn Abbey, Woburn Safari Park and Woburn Golf Club.

St Leonard's Church dates from the 1580s.

Located 40 miles (64 km) from central London, the village is 6 miles (9.7 km) from the M1 and benefits from a non-stop fast train from nearby Leighton Buzzard to Euston in just 30 minutes.

== History ==
There was a sizeable Roman settlement at Heath and Reach. Fragments of pottery, coins and traces of buildings were found in 1971 near Overend Green Farm, by the Roman road, Watling Street. The village was originally two small hamlets in the Royal Manor of Leighton and records are found for Heath in 1220 and Reach in 1216.

Heath and Reach was part of the parish of Leighton and was the property of the King of England. In 1539 a Muster Roll during the reign of Henry VIII listed the fighting men of the village, those aged 16–60, as "25 males who could be relied upon to fight in Henry's wars with France and the defence of Calais."

As a prominent Royalist, Lord Leigh's estates were seized in 1644 and given to Parliamentarians: the Royal Manor of Leighton, which included Heath and Reach, handed to Colonel John Okey, commander of the New Model Army dragoons and a signatory to the execution of Charles I. When Okey was executed for treason at the 1660 Restoration Charles II transferred the royal manor lease back to Lord Leigh whose line continued as lords of the manor into the 19th century.

Lieutenant Robert Strong, who was killed in action near Ypres in 1915, was from Heath and Reach. First born son of Robert Strong of Gig Lane, Robert Jr was British Army bandmaster in India prior to the war and a noted sportsman. Lieutenant Arthur Pearson was also from Heath and Reach, a pilot of 29 Squadron, Royal Flying Corps, was awarded the Military Cross in the Battle of the Somme for "conspicuous gallantry". He was shot down in flames and killed 1917 by von Richthofen.

== Governance ==
'Heath and Reach' is the name of the constituency that sends a Councillor to Central Bedfordshire Council. It includes the villages of Heath and Reach, Hockliffe, Eggington, Stanbridge, Tilsworth, Tebworth and Wingfield. The seat has been held by Councillor Mark Versallion since its creation in 2011.

== Geography ==
The parish is bounded in the south-west by the River Ouzel, in the north-east by the A5 (Watling Street), and includes the Kings's Wood nature reserve and the 400 acres (160 ha) Rushmere Country Park woods. The highest point is 480 feet (150 m) above sea level.

== Education ==
The village lower school St Leonard's was founded in 1846 by the Church of England and educates 100 children aged 4–9. There is also an on-site pre-school. The school's key stage 1 results remain "exceptionally above national and local averages" and Ofsted rate the school Outstanding.

== Culture and community ==
The village's annual Pancake Race organised every Shrove Tuesday by the Heath and Reach Women's Institute is a major feature of village life, raising money for charity. Leighton Buzzard Children's Theatre, run by Sally and David Allsopp, has been based in Heath and Reach since 1996. The group has raised over £120,000 for various charities through musical theatre and drama productions starring local children aged 4 to 18 who regularly perform at the local Library Theatre and School Theatres.

=== Community facilities ===
There are 622 homes in the parish and besides the church, school and golf club, the village has two pubs and a village store and a thriving Royal British Legion. There is also a sports association with tennis courts, playing fields and pavilion and a separate recreation ground. The village benefits from several community use meadows, public footpaths and bridleways. There is also a fishing club at the ten-acre Jones Lakes. Leighton Buzzard Golf Club lies just to the southwest of the village. Heath and Reach is also home to a heritage narrow gauge railway, which maintains the largest collection of narrow-gauge locomotives in the UK.

== Notable buildings ==
There are 26 structures within Heath and Reach civil parish that are listed by Historic England for their historical or architectural interest. No building is listed as Grade I, the designation of highest significance, and Heath Manor is listed as Grade II*.

== Filming location ==
The disused quarry on the outskirts of Heath and Reach has been used for film purposes, most notably The Mummy Returns (2001), The Da Vinci Code (2006), and Singularity (2012).

== Notable residents ==
In 1898 renowned American maritime artist Frederick Judd Waugh was recorded as living at Penlynn in Heath and Reach. The world relay gold medallist and TV presenter Kriss Akabusi MBE lives in Heath and Reach.
