= Leighton Buzzard =

Town in Bedfordshire, England

Coordinates: 51.9165°N 0.6617°W

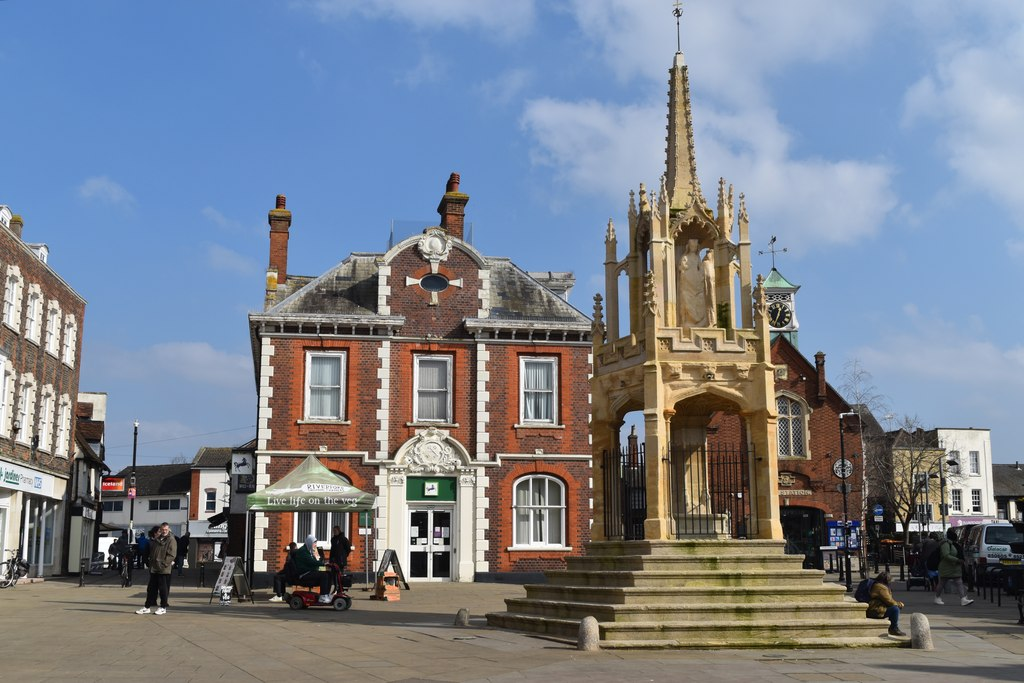
- Market Cross

- Location within Bedfordshire
- Interactive map of Leighton Buzzard
- Population: 42,727
- OS grid reference: SP921250
- Civil parish: Leighton-Linslade
- Unitary authority: Central Bedfordshire
- Ceremonial county: Bedfordshire
- Region: East
- Country: England
- Sovereign state: United Kingdom
- Post town: LEIGHTON BUZZARD
- Postcode district: LU7
- Dialling code: 01525
- Police: Bedfordshire
- Fire: Bedfordshire
- Ambulance: East of England
- UK Parliament: Dunstable and Leighton Buzzard

Leighton Buzzard (/ˈleɪtən ˈbʌzərd/ LAY-tən BUZ-ərd) is a market town in the civil parish of Leighton–Linslade, in the Central Bedfordshire district, in Bedfordshire, England, in the southwest of the county and close to the Buckinghamshire border. It lies between Aylesbury, Tring, Luton/Dunstable and Milton Keynes, near the Chiltern Hills.

It is 36 miles (58 km) northwest of Central London and linked to the capital by the Grand Union Canal and the West Coast Main Line. The built-up area extends on either side of the River Ouzel (here about 2 metres (6 ft 7 in) wide) to include its historically separate neighbour Linslade, and is administered by Leighton-Linslade Town Council.

== History ==
=== Foundation and development ===
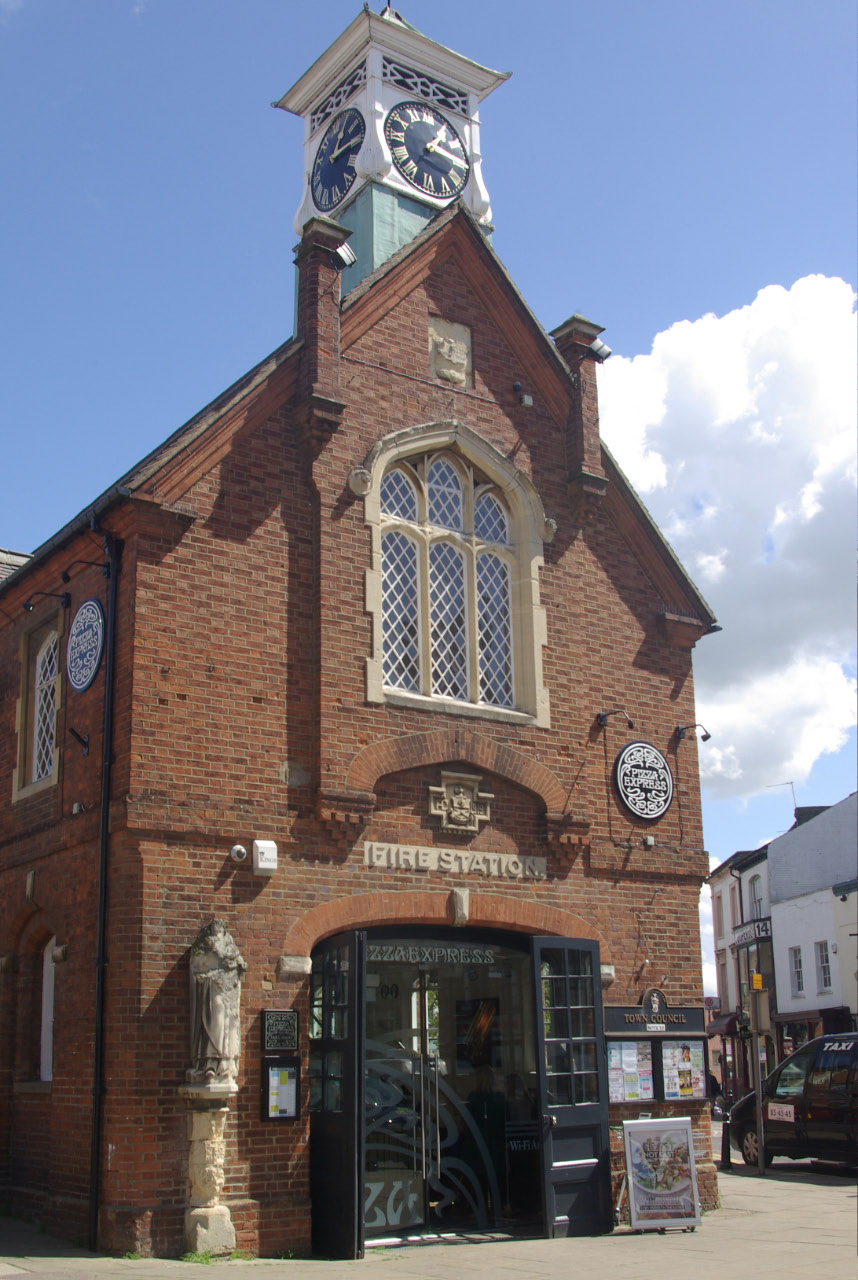
The Old Town Hall

It is unclear when the town was initially founded, although some historians believe that there may have been settlement in the area from as early as 571. There are a number of theories concerning the derivation of the town's name: ‘Leighton’ came from Old English Lēah-tūn, meaning 'farm in a clearing in the woods', and one version of the addition of ‘Buzzard’ was that it was added by the Dean of Lincoln, in whose diocese the town lay in the 12th century, from Beau-desert. Another version is that having two communities called ‘Leighton’ and seeking some means of differentiating them the Dean added the name of his local Prebendary or representative to that of the town. At that time it was Theobald de Busar and so over the years the town became known as Leighton Buzzard. The other Leighton became Leighton Bromswold. In the Domesday Book of 1086, Leighton Buzzard and Linslade were both called Leestone. A further variation may be seen in a legal record of 1424, where "William Dagenale of Leytun Busherd, Beds" appears as a defendant.

Leighton Buzzard developed into a thriving market town supported by good road, canal and, later, rail links to the agricultural hinterland and London. The town's market charter was granted in 1086 and is still active today. The High Street has numerous historical buildings, more than 70 of which are listed. They include the notable Bank Building on the Market Square (now home to Barclays Bank), designed by the eminent architect Alfred Waterhouse, designer of London's Natural History Museum, London. They also include the Old Town Hall, later used as a fire station and now as a restaurant.

=== Relationship to Linslade ===
The Grand Junction Canal opened in 1800. It skirted the western edge of the town, but lay just over the parish and county boundary (the River Ouzel), being in the neighbouring parish of Linslade in Buckinghamshire. The London and Birmingham Railway was built in the 1830s and passed just over half a mile west of the centre of Leighton Buzzard; Leighton railway station opened with the line in 1838. Although named after Leighton Buzzard, the station (like the canal) was actually in the parish of Linslade. When built, the station was in open countryside, with Linslade village lying 1 mile (1.6 km) north of the station at what is now known as Old Linslade. New development was subsequently laid out between the station and the canal, known initially as Chelsea or New Linslade, before assuming the name Linslade.

Linslade has always had Leighton Buzzard postal addresses, forming part of the Leighton Buzzard post town. Linslade remained administratively separate from Leighton Buzzard until 1965, when it was transferred from Buckinghamshire to Bedfordshire, and the urban districts of Leighton Buzzard and Linslade merged into a single Leighton-Linslade Urban District. The Office for National Statistics uses the name Leighton Buzzard for the whole built-up area, including Linslade.

=== Rothschild family ===
The town has had a long association with the Rothschild family, since Lionel de Rothschild bought neighbouring farmlands to the west of the town in 1873. Over time the farm developed into the Ascott House estate located less than 2 miles (3 km) from the town. In the late 19th century, Baron Ferdinand de Rothschild used the now demolished Leighton House and its stabling, on the High Street, as a hunting box. The family still maintain links with the town through their ownership of Southcourt Stud in Southcote.

=== Non-conformism ===
The town has a strong history of dissenters and is home to one of the oldest Friends meeting houses in the region. Established in the 18th century, local Quakers continue to meet in the Meeting House on North Street.

=== Poor law union ===
After the Poor Law Amendment Act 1834 Leighton Buzzard became the centre of a poor law union that consisted of 15 surrounding parishes with the union workhouse (still standing) being sited in Grovebury Road.

=== Leighton Buzzard Isolation Hospital ===
In 1847, additional land was obtained adjacent to the workhouse on which to build an isolation hospital. It had twenty beds over three wards, one each for patients with diphtheria, scarlet fever and typhoid. Jane Sarah Downer was appointed nurse-matron of the hospital in 1899, and worked there until at least 1911. Downer had trained under Eva Luckes at The London Hospital between 1895 and 1897, and then worked on the Private Nursing Staff for one year, before her appointment as matron in Leighton Buzzard.

=== World War II ===
During World War II, RAF Leighton Buzzard, a secret communications facility described as "the largest telephone exchange in the world", was located to the south of Stanbridge Road. Also the headquarters of No. 60 Group RAF, which controlled the air defence radar network across Britain, operated from Oxenden House (now demolished) off Plantation Road.

=== The Great Train Robbery ===
The Great Train Robbery took place in 1963 at Bridego Bridge just outside Leighton Buzzard. The robbers were held at the Old Police Station on Wing Road Linslade while waiting to be seen by the local magistrate after being captured a month after the robbery.

Leighton Buzzard station was the location for part of the film Robbery, which is based on the ‘Great Train Robbery’.

=== Telephone exchange ===
The UK's first and only TXE1 electronic telephone exchange went into service here in 1968. The large building, built on the site of the former Lake House, that housed this and later exchanges, can be found in Lake Street.

=== Expansion ===
The population of Leighton-Linslade was originally recorded in the 2001 census as 32,417. Part of Billington parish was transferred in 2003 to Leighton-Linslade, and the revised census result including this area was 32,753. At the 2011 census, the population of the Leighton-Linslade built-up area was recorded by the Office for National Statistics as 37,469, and was estimated to have reached 43,203 in 2020.

The town is expanding southwards, with the development of sites in southern Leighton Buzzard through the Southern Leighton Buzzard Development Brief. It is also expanding eastwards, with several developments forming the Eastern Leighton Linslade Urban Extension Scheme.

== Places of interest ==
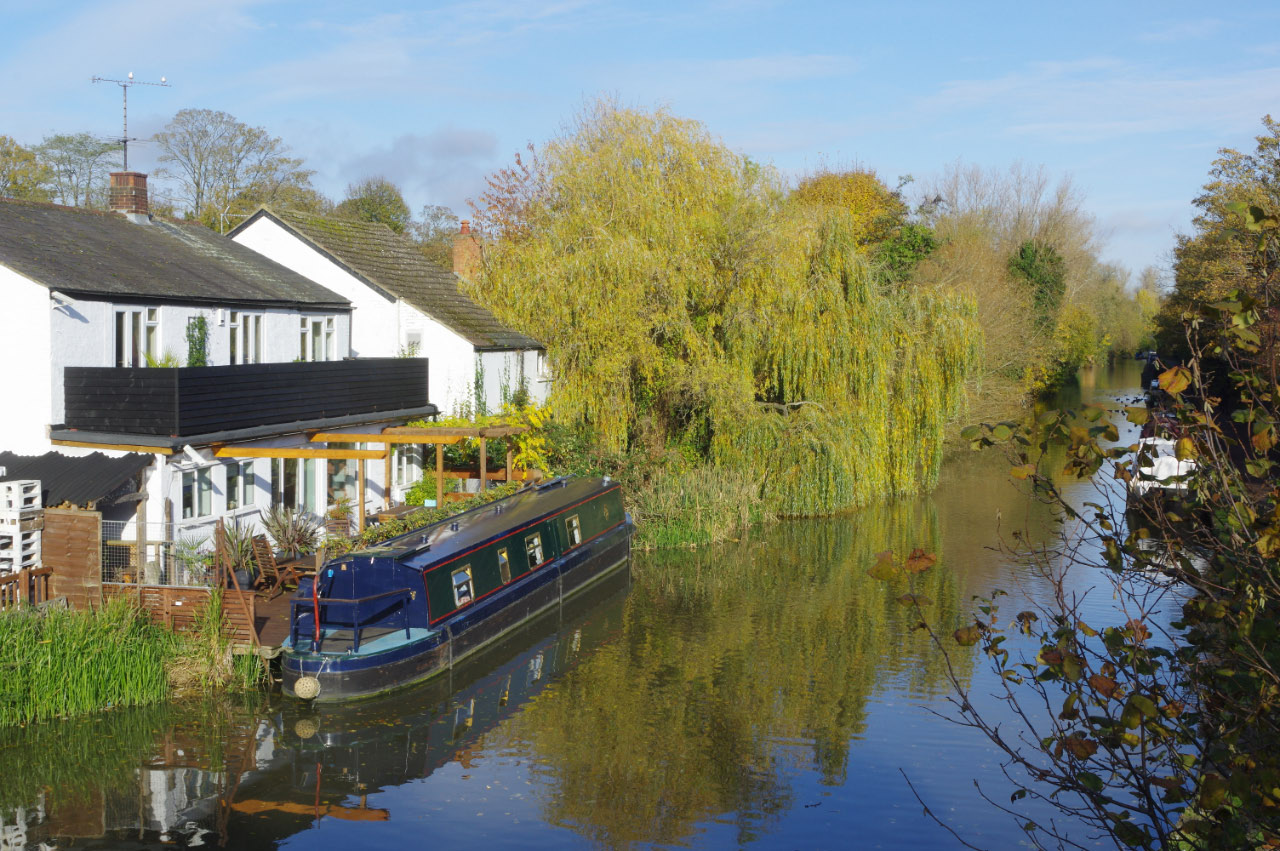
The Grand Union Canal, seen from the bridge on Leighton Road

The town is home to the Leighton Buzzard Light Railway, a narrow-gauge heritage railway, one of England's longest at just under 3 miles (4.8 km) long and oldest narrow-gauge lines, with an extensive collection of locomotives and rolling stock.

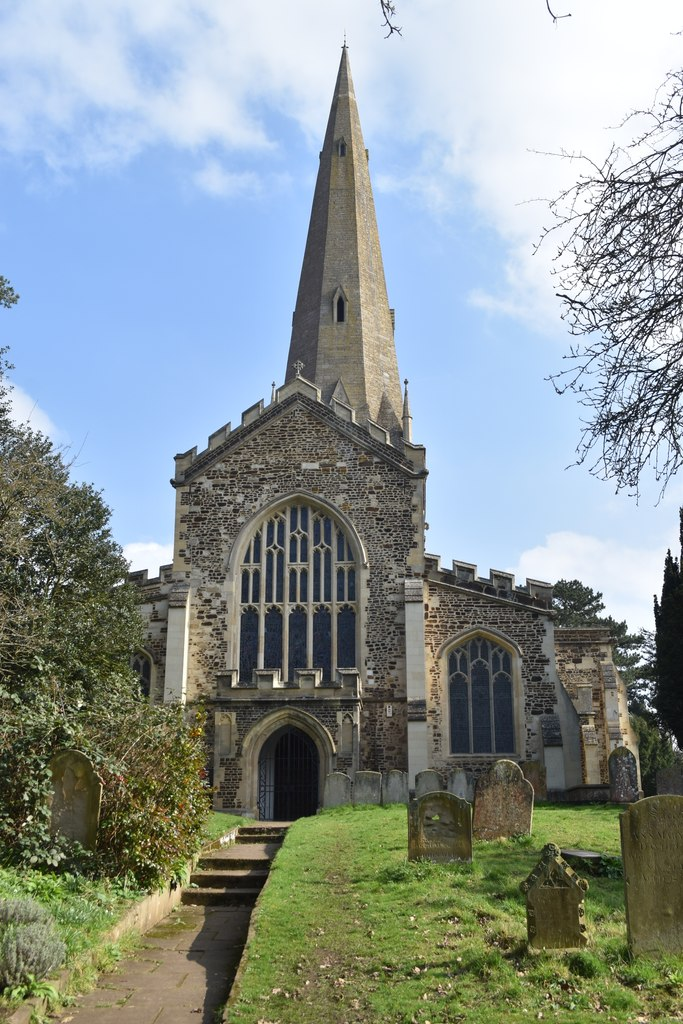
All Saints' Church

The Grand Union Canal runs through the town, alongside the River Ouzel.

All Saints' Church, an Early English parish church dating from 1277. The church is the starting point for the annual Wilkes Walk, described as "a curious procession of the church choir, clergy, and churchwardens across town to the alms houses in North Street." The church was damaged by fire in the 1980s, but has since undergone restoration. For information on the origin of the Medieval choir stalls see Tracy 1991.

The town has a combined library and theatre (called the Library Theatre) where both live events and film screenings are regularly held.

Rushmere Country Park and Stockgrove Country Park are in nearby Heath and Reach. The National Trust-operated country home Ascott House is located 2 miles (3 km) from the town in neighbouring Buckinghamshire.

== Transport ==
Leighton Buzzard is close to the M1 motorway and A5 road, and is served by London Northwestern Railway services on the West Coast Main Line railway at Leighton Buzzard railway station (in Linslade). The railway operates non-stop commuting services to Euston railway station, with the fastest journey times at 30 minutes.

The majority of Leighton Buzzard's bus services are operated by Arriva Shires & Essex. Services X2 and X3 provide a direct bus rapid transit service to Milton Keynes and Luton via the Luton to Dunstable Busway, with an onward connection to Luton Airport Arriva also operate the X4 service through the town to Aylesbury. Z&S and Red Rose also operate bus services into Leighton Buzzard which serve local estates and surrounding villages, with local, town services operated by Centrebus.

== Economy ==
Leighton Buzzard is now home to several UK head offices for national and international firms. Connells Group, the estate agents' chains, have their head offices in the town, as do the UK operations of Tupperware and Grundfos. FTSE 250 company Rightmove had their first ever office in the town, which at the time consisted of just 25 employees. Leighton Buzzard is also home to the Vinci SA Technology Centre, where technology for London's new Crossrail stations was tested. Since 2014, the town has had its own brewery.

The town has a sizeable sand quarrying industry, with good enough quality 'building' sand to export to Egypt. The town is, or has at one time been, the home to various other industries including B/E Aerospace (Aircraft Interiors), Polyformes, Lipton Tea which has now closed down, Gossard clothing, and Lancer Boss (forklifts, etc.).

== Governance ==
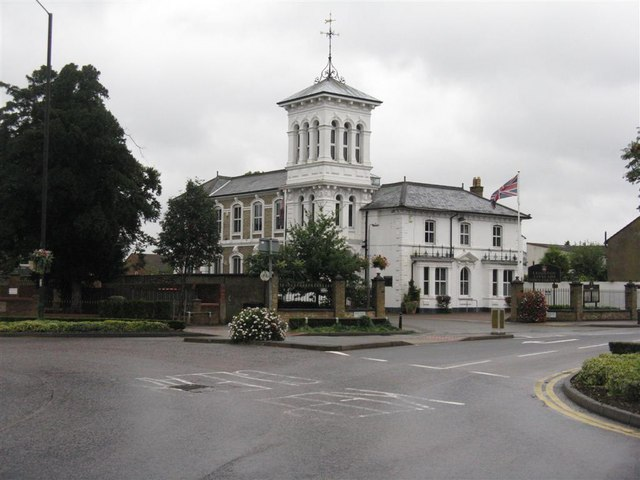
White House, Hockliffe Street: Leighton-Linslade Town Council offices

There are two tiers of local government covering Leighton Buzzard, at civil parish (town) and unitary authority level: Leighton-Linslade Town Council and Central Bedfordshire Council. The town council is based at the White House on Hockliffe Street.

=== Administrative history ===
Leighton Buzzard was an ancient parish. The parish historically comprised five townships, being Billington, Eggington, Heath and Reach, Stanbridge and a Leighton Buzzard township covering the town itself and adjoining areas. Such townships were all reclassified as civil parishes in 1866.

In 1891 the civil parish of Leighton Buzzard was made a local government district, administered by an elected local board. Such local government districts were reconstituted as urban districts under the Local Government Act 1894.

The Leighton Buzzard Urban District was abolished in 1965, merging with Linslade Urban District to become Leighton-Linslade Urban District. The merged council was based at the White House, which had previously been the headquarters of the Leighton Buzzard Urban District Council. In 1961 (the last census before the merger) the parish and urban district of Leighton Buzzard had a population of 11,745.

Leighton-Linslade Urban District only existed for nine years; it was abolished in 1974 under the Local Government Act 1972. District-level functions passed to South Bedfordshire District Council, which in turn was replaced by the unitary Central Bedfordshire Council in 2009, which also took over the functions of the abolished Bedfordshire County Council. A successor parish covering the abolished urban district of Leighton-Linslade was created in 1974, with its council taking the name Leighton-Linslade Town Council.

== Sport ==
Leighton Buzzard is represented by the sporting teams of Leighton Town F.C. who play football in the Spartan South Midlands Football League. Also at the Bell Close Site are Leighton Buzzard Tennis Club who have been a part of the town since the 1930s. Leighton Buzzard Hockey Club established in 1901, play field hockey and run four men's and four ladies teams of all ability. The men's teams play in the South Hockey League and the ladies teams play in the Five Counties Hockey League. Leighton Buzzard Hockey Club also have junior sides; starting age of 5. Leighton Buzzard R.F.C. play rugby union in South West 1 East and the Ladies rugby team play in NC South East North 2.

Leighton Buzzard Golf Club was established in 1925 and there is also an active running club, Leighton Buzzard Athletics Club. Established in 2011 Leighton Buzzard Road Cycling Club is a cycling club for riders of all abilities. Their race team LBRCC-Solgar compete in local, as well as national, cycling events. Established in 2000, Leighton Linslade Croquet Club, a member of the Croquet Association, have three croquet lawns in Pages Park next to the pavilion.

A greyhound racing track was opened by the Leighton Buzzard Greyhound Racing Association. The track which was located on Bridge Meadows, a flood plain and wharfage between the Grand Union Canal and the River Ouze, south of Bridge Street and is believed to have opened during 1931. The racing was independent (not affiliated to the sports governing body the National Greyhound Racing Club) known as a flapping track, which was the nickname given to independent tracks. The date of closure is not known.

== Media ==
Local news and television programmes are provided by BBC East and ITV Anglia.

Local radio stations are BBC Three Counties Radio on 103.8 FM, Heart East on 97.6 FM, Greatest Hits Radio Bucks, Beds and Herts (formerly Mix 96) on 96.2 FM.

The Leighton Buzzard Observer is the town's local newspaper.

== Education ==
=== Lower schools ===
- Beaudesert Lower School – Apennine Way
- Clipstone Brook Lower School – Brooklands Drive
- Greenleas School – Derwent Road
- Greenleas School, Sandhills – Kestrel Way
- Dovery Down Lower School – Heath Road
- Heathwood Lower School – Heath Road
- Leedon Lower School – Highfield Road
- Linslade Lower School – Leopold Road
- Mary Bassett Lower School – Bassett Road
- Pulford VA C of E Lower School – Pulford Road
  - As this is a religious school, distances to houses are not considered for admission, and no Leighton Buzzard residence will have it deemed as the closest school for priority admission purposes.
- The Rushmere Park Academy – East Street
- St Leonard's (Heath & Reach) V A Lower School – Thrift Road
- Southcott Lower School – Bideford Green

The education authority, for Leighton Buzzard, since September 2019, calculates distances from each residence to the nearest lower school (in most circumstances) and uses that to determine priority admissions; the education authority uses computer systems to do this. Designated catchment zones are, as of 2024, no longer used for lower schools in Leighton Buzzard.

=== Middle schools ===
- Brooklands Middle School – a school near the south east edge of the town.
- Gilbert Inglefield Academy – next door to Vandyke Upper School.
- Leighton Middle School – in the centre of the town, Mary Norton, who wrote The Borrowers books, lived there in her childhood.
- Linslade School (Middle) – situated over the road from Cedars.

=== Upper schools ===
- Cedars Upper School – Located on the west edge of town, in Linslade, adjoined to Tiddenfoot Leisure Centre. Cedars was once a grammar school.
- Vandyke Upper School – Situated on the east edge of town, on Vandyke Road.

=== Other schools ===
- Oak Bank School – located on Sandy Lane.

=== Further education ===
- Central Bedfordshire College has a campus near the town centre of Leighton Buzzard.

== Twin towns ==
Leighton Buzzard was twinned with Coulommiers in France in 1958. The twinning was renewed in 1982. It was also twinned with Titisee-Neustadt in Germany in 1991.

== Notable people ==
Ferdinand de Rothschild, ca.1880

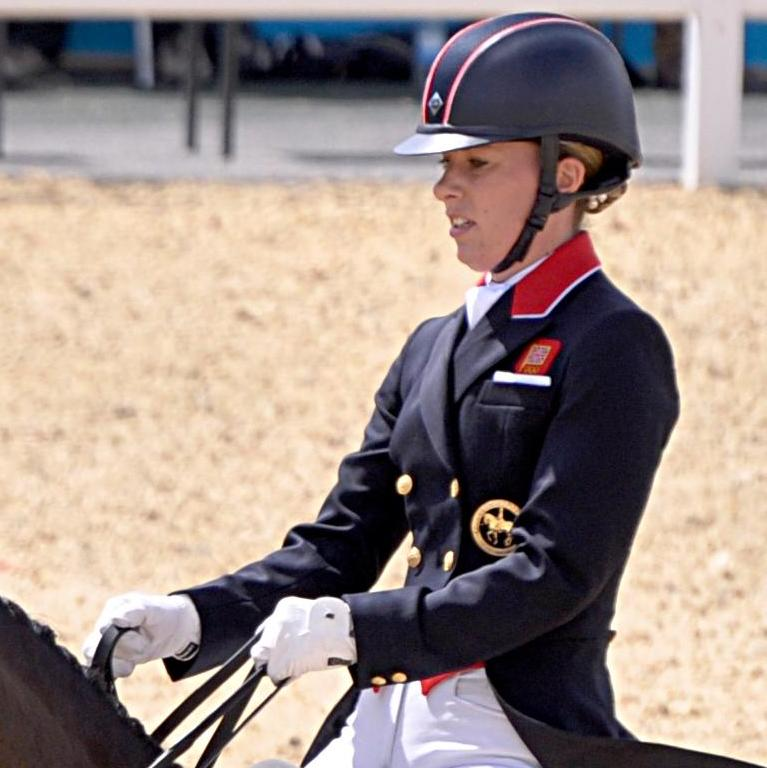
Charlotte Dujardin, 2012

- Edward Backwell (ca.1618–1683), a goldsmith-banker and politician.
- Alan Biley (born 1957), former footballer.
- Sir Nicholas Cosmo Bonsor, 4th Baronet (1942–2023), a Conservative politician.
- Harry Brown (1863–1925), Australian politician, mayor of Perth, member of the Legislative Assembly of Western Australia.
- Samuel Claridge (1828–1919), early settler of the Muddy River Valley in Nevada and Thatcher, Arizona.
- Francis Augustus Cox (1783–1853), Baptist minister, writer, abolitionist.
- Adam Cunnington (born 1987), former footballer.
- Louise Dearman (born 1979), who played Glinda in the West End production of Wicked, was brought up in Leighton Buzzard, attending Linslade Middle School and Cedars Upper School.
- Jonathan Dollimore (born 1948), academic, philosopher.
- Charlotte Dujardin (born 1985), triple Olympic gold medallist, was brought up in the town and attended Vandyke Upper School.
- George Felt (1601–ca.1693), a founder of Charlestown, Massachusetts.
- Rusty Goffe (born 1948), actor, lives in the town.
- Fred Hartley (1905–1980), Scottish pianist and composer of light music, died at his home, 3 Pulford Road in April 1980.
- Julie Hilling (born 1955), politician, former MP for Bolton West.
- Albert Kempster (1874–1952), soldier, athlete, sport shooter, Olympic bronze-medallist.
- Jim Kempster (1900–1945), an international speedway rider.
- Alexander Muddiman (1875–1928), magistrate, civil servant and administrator of the British Raj.
- Mary Norton (1903–1992), children's writer, famous for The Borrowers series, was brought up at The Cedars on the High Street, now the site of Leighton Middle School. The building now hosts a blue plaque in commemoration.
- Philip O'Connor (1916–1998), writer and surrealist poet, was born in the town.
- Martin O'Donnell (born 1986), an internationally ranked professional snooker player, lives in the town with his family.
- Harry Pantling (1891–1952), former footballer.
- Edgar Allison Peers (1891–1952), academic, educationist, known for his pseudonym "Bruce Truscot" in which he criticised British universities, coined "red-brick university".
- J. E. M. Pritchard (1889–1921), British military officer, aviator.
- Derek Reid (1927–2006), academic, mycologist.
- Baron Ferdinand de Rothschild (1839–1898), lived in Leighton House in the High Street before building and moving to Waddesdon Manor.
- William Sclater (1575–1626), an English clergyman and controversialist.
- Cyril Seedhouse (1892–1966), sprinter, Olympic bronze-medallist.
- John Samuel Swire (1825–1898), businessman, founded the Swire Group.
- Christian Tindall (1878–1951), officer in the Indian Civil Service and first-class cricketer.
- Hayley Tompkins (born 1971), artist
- Sue Tompkins (born 1971), artist, singer.

- The Barron Knights (formed 1959), a humorous pop rock group were formed in the town.
- Kajagoogoo (founded 1978), a new wave band, were formed in the town.

== Climate ==
Leighton Buzzard experiences an oceanic climate (Köppen climate classification Cfb) similar to almost all of the United Kingdom.

Climate data for Leighton Buzzard
Month	Jan	Feb	Mar	Apr	May	Jun	Jul	Aug	Sep	Oct	Nov	Dec	Year
Mean daily maximum °C (°F)	6 (43)	7 (45)	10 (50)	12 (54)	16 (61)	19 (66)	21 (70)	22 (72)	18 (64)	14 (57)	9 (48)	6 (43)	13 (55)
Mean daily minimum °C (°F)	3 (37)	3 (37)	4 (39)	5 (41)	8 (46)	10 (50)	12 (54)	13 (55)	11 (52)	8 (46)	5 (41)	3 (37)	7 (45)
Average precipitation mm (inches)	69.3 (2.73)	59.4 (2.34)	46.5 (1.83)	70.1 (2.76)	58.1 (2.29)	58.9 (2.32)	46.0 (1.81)	68.9 (2.71)	51.7 (2.04)	84.3 (3.32)	93.9 (3.70)	80.9 (3.19)	788.0 (31.02)
