= Architecture of Aylesbury =

Architecture of County town of Buckinghamshire

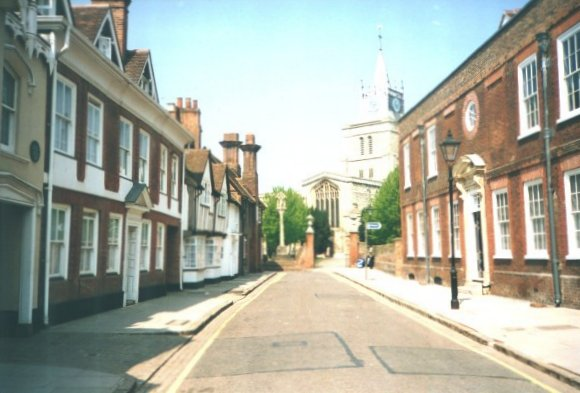
An 18th century street, Aylesbury.

The architecture of Aylesbury, the county town of Buckinghamshire, reflects that which can be found in many small towns in England, with provincial designers adapting metropolitan fashions to more modest budgets.

This recreation and interpretation of a certain style were not confined to private houses, but to civic architecture too: an illustrious architect added to civic pride; and when an architect was too expensive for the civic coffers, for a fraction of the price he would judge a competition between local architects, for the privilege of designing a town hall or church. This is exactly what happened in Aylesbury. John Vanbrugh judged two sets of plans for the County Hall (now Aylesbury Crown Court).

== Saxon to Medieval period ==
=== Aylesbury Castle ===
Aylesbury's one-time castle is today only remembered by the name of Castle Street. It is thought that it was a Norman structure consisting of just a motte and bailey, likely situated within Anglo-Saxon fortifications later known as Castle Fee. Built immediately after the conquest, it was probably demolished after outliving its requirement following the quelling of the civil insurrections of the early 12th century. Archaeological excavations in the 1960s uncovered part of the castle wall and it is from these excavations that we get most of what we know about the castle today.

=== The Parish Church of St. Mary ===
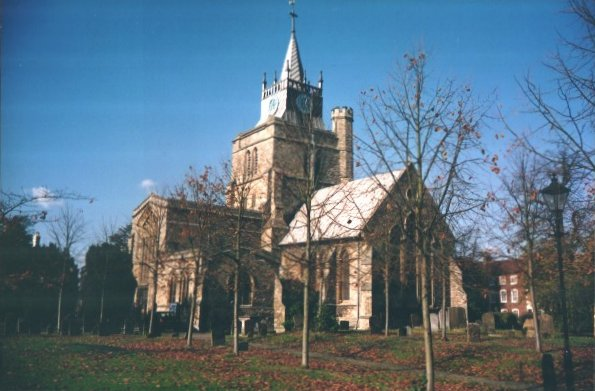
St Mary's Church, Aylesbury

The parish church, dedicated to St Mary, is the oldest building in Aylesbury. Cruciform in design, it follows a common layout of English churches - the tower in the centre, the nave with aisles in the west, leading to the chancel in the east, and chapels in the north and south transepts. Beneath the eastern chapel (known as Lady Chapel) is a crypt containing Saxon brickwork; Aylesbury was a Saxon settlement known as Aeglesburge. It is thought a Norman church, of which only the font remains, then stood on the site. The present church was built during the first half of the 13th century and has later Perpendicular battlements. The tower is crowned by a small spire dating from the reign of Charles II. Between 1850 and 1869 the church was restored under the direction of Sir George Gilbert Scott. Pevsner describes this restoration as "so reckless both exterior and interior look mostly Victorian". Scott certainly removed some interesting features such as the completely enclosed and intricately carved manorial pew, the "three-decker" pulpit and replaced some perpendicular windows with the more Gothic triple lancet windows beloved of the Victorians (the original east window can now be found in the gardens of Green End House in Rickford's Hill). However, in fairness to Scott the church was in a dilapidated state, the roof was perilous, and innumerable internal burials had undermined the foundations, in addition to this much of the church was left to local organizations, the local fire service kept three fire engines in one of the chapels, and the local regiment and militia stored their stock of gunpowder in part of the church. Many fine architectural details did survive the neglect and following restoration – the large west window, the perpendicular roofs to the transepts, the late 12th-century font and the four misericords besides some well-carved stone monuments and memorial tablets. In the 1970s the church was again considered perilously unstable, and at one time appeared to be facing demolition. It was eventually saved by a further, more tactful, restoration, and is today still the town's principal Church of England place of worship.

=== The Friarage ===
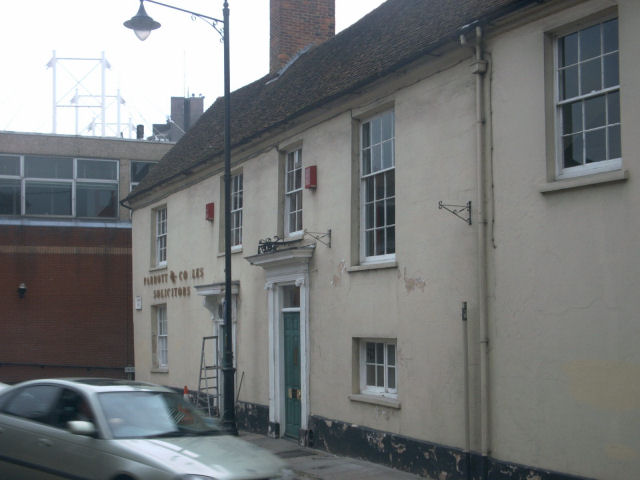
The old friarage building

This building, the former friarage at 14, Bourbon Street is the oldest building in Aylesbury that was used as a residential dwelling. Constructed circa 1386 as a Franciscan priory the substructure remains intact although the exterior is more modern. Part of the original foundation of the building can still be seen at the side of the Friarage Passage.

It is possible that the building was re-fronted shortly after the dissolution of the monasteries by King Henry VIII in the 16th century. Re-fronting was a common practice in British building techniques and involves stripping away the external shell of the older building, sometimes just the front, and then adding a new shell.

This building in particular is discernible as a much older building than it looks because of the uneven windows at the front. One will notice that no two windows are on the same level or of the same size: this indicates a more organic growth of the building over many years rather than one that has been specifically designed to look a particular way – this is a common feature of buildings of this age.

There is a high likelihood that the building was re-fronted for a second time or had extra features added to it in the 18th century: the front door, for instance, is of a much later design than the 16th century. However, records suggest that the size of the doorway and the position of the windows are original features of the 14th-century structure.

Today the building is the main office for a firm of solicitors, who have been based in this building since the firm was founded: it had been the private residence of one of the firm's first partners.

== 15th century to 18th century ==
Aylesbury is and always has been quintessentially a market town, with the Market Square being the heart of the town. The Market Square is still at the centre of the town and is still fairly well used with four markets a week being held regularly and other events on special occasions. However, it is the siting of the medieval market stalls both semi-permanent and temporary which has given the Market Square an unusual architectural phenomenon. As the stalls, or allocated lots, of the traders in the square, became less transient so the stalls began to become permanent buildings within the confines of the square itself, thus many of the square's oldest buildings such as the King's Head Inn are hidden in what appear to be back alleys on the periphery of the square. This encroachment continued into the 16th century until the western area of the square (where the Dark Lantern public house is today) was a complex of alleys and lanes. This curious maze-like complex existed until the 1960s redevelopment of the town, and the King's Head still appears to be partially hidden by buildings in front of it.

=== Parsons Fee ===
Parsons Fee has its name steeped in history. Aylesbury remained a feudal manor until the 13th century when new smaller landholdings were formed. These new small manors created by royal grant were often known as fees: Aylesbury had several fees circa the reign of Henry II. These included the Castle Fee held by the principal lord of the manor of Aylesbury, who also held the Lord's fee; Otterers fee which was granted to Roger Foll, the King's otter hunter in 1179 and Church Fee endowed to the church, which eventually in Aylesbury was allowed a small degree of autonomy as a prebend of the Diocese of Lincoln. Hence church fee was controlled by the "parson" or priest of Aylesbury, and thus Church Fee came to be known as Parson's Fee.

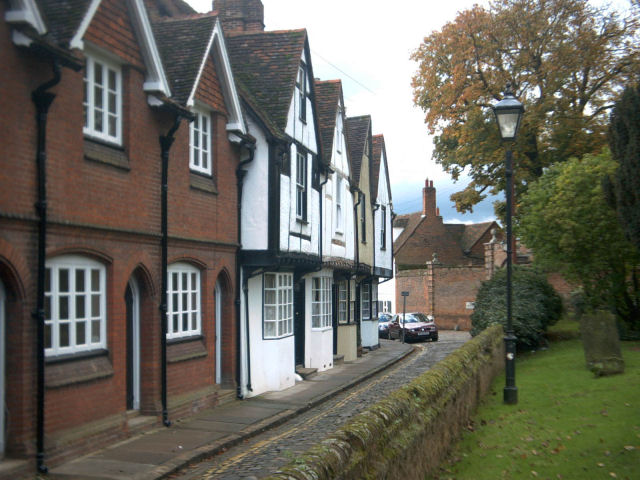
Houses in Parson's Fee

This row of cottages adjacent to the parish church are some of the oldest dwellings in Aylesbury. These timber framed dwellings which date from the 17th century have oversailing upper stories, a common feature of the period, which had the advantage of increasing the space of a small land site.

The brick-built cottages to the left of the picture (just visible) are almshouses belonging to the Thomas Hickman charity. Thomas Hickman was a resident of Aylesbury in the 17th century who left money in his will to provide money for dwellings for the old and infirm. These dwellings were built in the 19th century to look like their neighbours.

== 18th century architecture ==
While the church cannot be called architecturally outstanding, it does form an integral part of a townscape seemingly unchanged from the 18th century. Sited upon a hill, it is surrounded by narrow streets, and squares of substantial 18th-century townhouses, which were not included in the large replanning and development of the town in the late 1960s. This area compromising Castle Street, Church Street, Temple Square (named after the Temple family of Stowe House), and Church Square including Parson's Fee gives a clear indication of how Aylesbury must have appeared in the 18th century and has an architectural ambiance quite different to the remainder of the town.

=== County Hall (County Court) ===
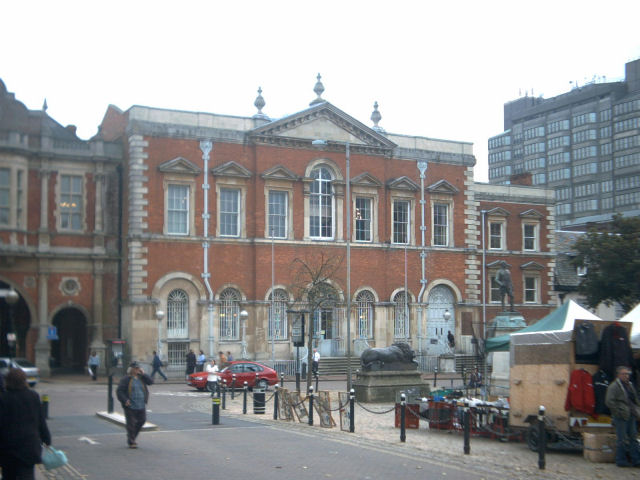
In the shadow of its Brutalist replacement, the former County Hall, Aylesbury. John Vanbrugh received the credit, the true architect Thomas Harris was forgotten. This building now houses the Crown Court.

Aylesbury has many public buildings which reflect its position as the county town of Buckinghamshire, a position it has held since the 16th century when King Henry VIII transferred the status from Buckingham. Legend states it was a move to impress Anne Boleyn's father, who held the manor at the time, but this is probably apocryphal. As county town it is the seat of Buckinghamshire County Council, a body responsible for the minor day-to-day running of an English county. It was also the home of the local assizes today known as the Crown Court. Thus the town has always had a structure known as County Hall: today the building known by that name houses merely the offices of the County Council. In previous centuries it housed not only the administrative offices of the county but also the county court chamber, where crimes such as murder, treason and those felonies too serious for a small town magistrate's court were tried. In addition, the County Hall often had an assembly room where entertainment and balls would take place for the more worthy members of the county and their families. Thus in the 18th century County Hall was a reflection of county prestige.

In the early 18th century the elders of Aylesbury decided to build a new County Hall. Plans were submitted by two architects, Mr Brandon and Thomas Harris. The plan was selected by John Vanbrugh.

The building was finally completed in 1740, despite its lack of an illustrious architect it is a handsome red brick building of seven bays and two stories. The windows are round topped on the lower floor and pedimented on the upper. The three central bays are unified under a pediment. The whole style of the building is Palladian with some baroque influences. One feature on the principal facade shows the building's provincial pedigree, Vanbrugh or Wren would have left the facade undecorated, or the windows interspersed by pilasters, here in rural Aylesbury the architect chose to place a humble drainpipe symmetrically between the windows, in London plumbing was discrete or hidden. The interior contained a panelled courtroom and a council chamber.

Almost from the moment of the building's completion, the 18th-century County Hall was not large enough. As local government became more complex and bureaucratic more office space was required and so judges' lodgings were constructed in 1849–1850 on the back of County Hall. Following the Local Government Act 1888 the newly established Buckinghamshire County Council based itself here, thus further council rooms, including a mayor's parlour, were added too.

=== Ceely House ===
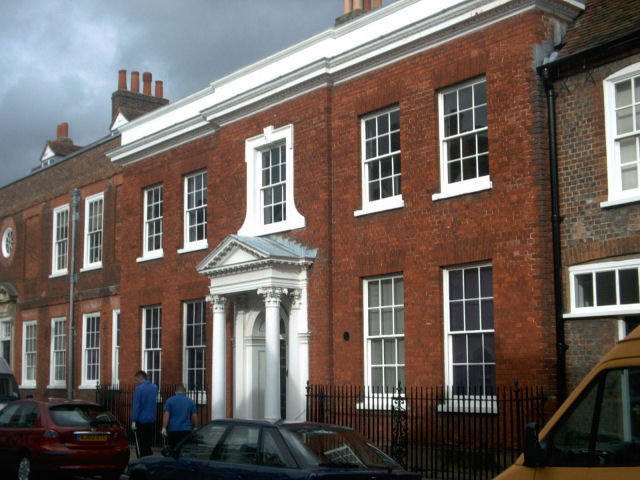
Ceely House

Ceely House is one of Aylesbury's larger houses. Of medieval origin it was the brotherhood house of the Fraternity of the Virgin Mary. In the mid 18th century it was converted to a private house and given a new classical front, by the Aylesbury lawyer Hugh Barker Bell. Constructed of red brick, its main facade is five bays. The centre bay projects slightly to accentuate the main entrance, which is protected by a porch in a loose palladian style of two unfluted Corinthean columns supporting a pediment. The pitched roof is hidden by an unusual parapet masquerading as an undecorated entablature, showing the unknown architect had an interest in a purer form of classicism than he was permitted to design in Aylesbury. By this date, architectural engravings of works by the master architects in Rome and elsewhere were widely available, and it is likely that this is the source of the inspiration behind some of the more interesting features of Ceely House, including its porch which is a miniature portico. As in the case of the Friarage however Ceely House is another example of a much older building with a new front: medieval wall paintings may be found in the upper storeys of the house, which is now part of the Buckinghamshire County Museum.

=== Ardenham House ===
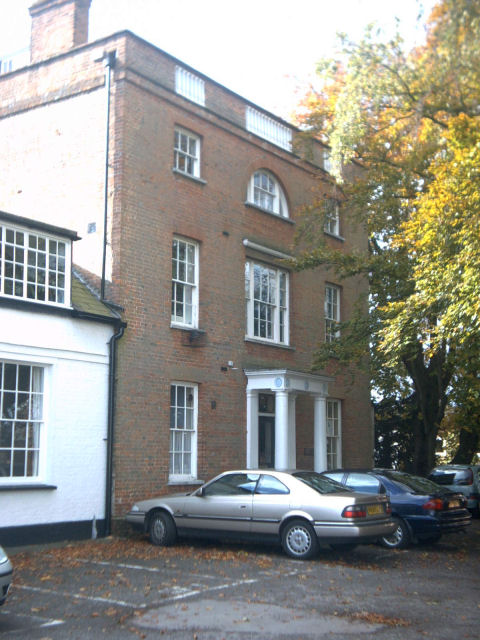
Ardenham House designed by Joseph Nollekens

Ardenham House is one of Aylesbury's most important late Georgian houses by virtue of it being one of the few buildings in the town accredited to a notable designer albeit a sculptor rather than an architect. Joseph Nollekens is said to have designed this large neoclassical house for his sister-in-law a "Miss Welch". The daughter of Justice Saunders Welch, (a friend of both Samuel Johnson and William Hogarth) Nollekens had married her younger sister Mary in 1772. This means the house can be no earlier than this date. Miss Welch is reported to have been a great intellectual, using Ardenham house as a literary salon. The large square red-bricked edifice is of a simple design – a three bayed front of three floors. The severity of the facade is only alleviated by a porch with tuscan columns, with a tripartite window above, and above that a tripartite lunette window. The roofline is hidden by a broken parapet. The design of this facade is typical of the more simple neoclassical approach to architecture of the late 18th century.

== 19th century ==
It has been said "It is a well-known fact that the nineteenth century had no art style of its own". While to an extent this may be true, during this period there was also a far stretching philosophy determining the reasoning behind the variation in styles used. This included not just international politics and religion, but also a huge increase in patrons outside of the church and upper classes (the sectors traditionally the principal patrons of architecture). This was a direct result of the new wealth created by the industrial revolution. This was certainly the case in Aylesbury where the 19th century proved to be a period of huge expansion, with the creation of a large amount of new buildings both private and public in a variety of revival styles.

The 19th century saw a period of unprecedented expansion to the town brought about by improved methods of transport allowing increased industry: in 1814 the Grand Union Canal reached the town which then had a population of 3,450. When the London and Birmingham Railway arrived in 1839, the population was 5,000. The second railway, the Great Western in 1863, served a population of 6,170. By this time, the town had the first of its large national employers the printers Hazel, Watson and Viney. By the end of the century, Aylesbury had a population of 10,000, all of whom had to be housed, many in the solid 19th century houses which grew up on the roads approaching the town – Tring Road, Bierton Road and Wendover Road. Many of these large Gothic villas still stand today.

Two of Aylesbury's earliest notable 19th century buildings were at the time of their erection built for social reasons in open countryside, opposite each other, on the road to Bierton immediately adjacent to the town. These were the Union Workhouse in 1844, and the County Gaol in 1845.

=== The Union Workhouse ===
Workhouses were a necessity of 19th century life in that they provided refuge for paupers. In exchange for work the destitute of all ages received board and lodging. In reality husbands and wives and their children were often strictly separated into different parts of the workhouse according to age and sex. In defence of the workhouse system it can be said that it was an ordered and regulated improvement on the scant almost non existent systems which existed before. Pevsner dismisses Aylesbury Workhouse as "Red brick, gabled, dull". Workhouses were frequently designed to be as austere and forbidding as possible in order to deter the undeserving. In fact Aylesbury's workhouse built of a mellow redbrick, with large bay windows and tall decorative chimneys was obviously designed by the architects Strethill Oakes Foden and Henry W. Parker to resemble an inviting Tudor manor house. The large gatehouse (to the right in the illustration) reminiscent of those of an Elizabethan or Jacobean Manor in fact was designed to provide, the barest legal, accommodation for passing vagrants on whom the town did not wish to spend its money. These unfortunates were allowed one night's refuge before being sent outside of the town's confines. While it is debatable if the architect truly achieved his goal, the Workhouse was certainly an architectural and aesthetic improvement on many of its contemporaries. The building still stands, and houses the Tindal Centre, a hospital for people experiencing mental illness. Thus 160 years after its completion still serves the community of Aylesbury.

=== The County Gaol ===
The County Gaol, Aylesbury, 1900

If the Workhouse was designed to be inviting and warm, the County Gaol most definitely was not. Designed by a Major J. Jebb in 1845 the layout of the original design was to serve one of the Victorian eras most controversial methods of penal reform. Prisoners were kept in complete solitary confinement, and silence, for the duration of their sentences. 250 men were kept in individual cells in which they ate, slept and washed alone and in silence. They left their cells only to worship. The prison chapel (described by Pevsner as "elegantly built" had 247 seats designed that while the convicts could see the priest, they could not see each other.

The architecture externally of the Gaol could be described as typical 19th century prison architecture, the principal facade facing onto the Bierton Road, the only part of the prison visible to the public has classical pretensions. Built of red brick with dressed stone quoining the focal point is the large central bay containing the arched entrance. The bay has an entablature but no pediments. The frieze bears the date 1845 in Roman numerals. The central bay is flanked by two short wings containing administrative offices leading to two large cubed blocks which were the residences of the governor and his deputy. An unexplainable architectural mystery here is that the short flanking wings are dwarfed by massive chimneys containing far more chimney pots than the rooms within could possibly require. Behind this severe public face of the prison, all attempts at attractive architecture ceased. Tall red brick cell blocks several stories high under a slate roof surrounded the central courtyard. The architecture was utilitarian in the extreme. The prison still stands, the main facade largely unchanged. It remains a prison. See Aylesbury Prison.

=== The Old Bank ===
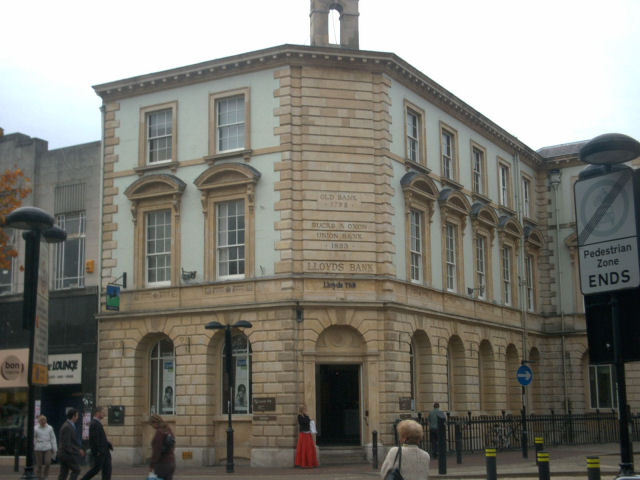
Lloyds Bank

The Old Aylesbury Bank was founded in 1795 by a local entrepreneur William Rickford and was for many years the only banking establishment in the town. The quality of the bank's architecture is a good barometer of the wealth that came from being the sole financial depository within a large rural area. The building dates from 1853. It seems that the highly fashionable Gothic revival had not yet reached Aylesbury, as the owners of the bank selected an Italianate classical style. The ground floor is rusticated but the blocks of ashlar are imitation, as is the quoining on the floors above. The upper floor, which would have been the banks administrative offices, suggests a piano nobile, with tall sash windows crowned by segmental pediments. The Bank standing on the junction of Market Square and Kingsbury Square has a canted facade in order to suit the triangular junction cause by the meeting of the two squares and a common street. The building in style is very reminiscent of those buildings of Thomas Cubitt and Edward Blore in London at this period. The possibility of a notable architect is likely as in nearby Leighton Buzzard the great Gothic revival architect Alfred Waterhouse was commissioned to design an equally small provincial bank (the Basset Bank) in the town's High Street and there was great rivalry between the small rural banks. The appearance of the Bank itself was seen not only as a sign of prestige, but also financial security, both evaluated by small local businessmen and farmers when entrusting their money.

=== The Corn Exchange ===
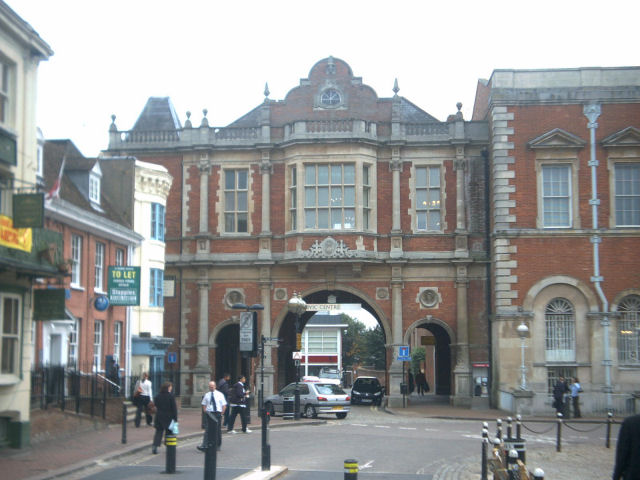
The old Corn Exchange (from 1901, Aylesbury Town Hall)

From the beginning of the 19th century, most towns in England had a building known as the corn exchange. Here farmers and grain merchants bartered for, and fixed the price of grain. In a rural community, where the greatest percentage of the community was directly involved with agriculture, this was a very important building, as here was decided the economy of the district. Often other agricultural commodities such as wool, were traded here. The corn exchange was often a grand imposing building which doubled as a venue for public entertainments, such as concerts and plays. The corn exchange in Aylesbury is less grand than some of its contemporaries: at nearby Leighton Buzzard the corn exchange was an Italianate palace. The building was erected by a consortium of local business men known as the Aylesbury Market Company, with capita of £18,000. They purchased and demolished the White Hart Inn replacing it with a new cattle market and the Corn Exchange. The site adjoined the County Hall which conveniently reflected its intended importance in the community. Designed by D Brandon in 1865, the Corn Exchange takes the form of a red brick tripartite triumphal arch leading to further council offices. Above the arches the reception rooms have large mullioned and transomed windows. This Jacobethan building sits incongruously in the corner of the Market Square next to the classical county hall and opposite a bow fronted regency public house with an ornate entablature. However, this siting of opposing styles of architecture, and constant change is the essence of character of an English market town. The agricultural depression which occurred from the 1870s resulted in a steep decline in the value of grain, the corn exchange never realised the profits its builders intended and in 1901 it was eventually sold to the Urban District Council as the new Aylesbury Town Hall.

The Corn Exchange today houses council conference rooms and a youth coffee bar.

=== The Clocktower ===
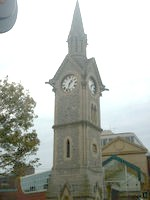
Aylesbury Clocktower (1876)

Market Square is the historic trading centre of the town, and indeed markets are still held here weekly today. The site at the centre of the square was formerly occupied by the market house which served on the ground level as an open covered market. Stall holders would pay extra to have their market stall here, above it would have been a town meeting room, where the stallholders' fees were collected and kept. Often these upper chambers also served as a form of town hall, a similar market house is at the nearby town of Amersham. The Market House was demolished in 1866: by this time markets while still a popular occurrence had been replaced in importance by regular and permanent shops. Ten years later on the site was built the clocktower, constructed of local stone, in the Gothic revival style, designed by the local architect D Brandon, also responsible for the Corn Exchange and many other public buildings in the town. The clocktower complete with spire sits on a slightly raised dais from the rest of the square and has been used as a platform from which important speeches have been made in the past. The horse troughs that had been placed adjacent to the clocktower when it was constructed have since been removed.

=== Aylesbury's smaller churches ===
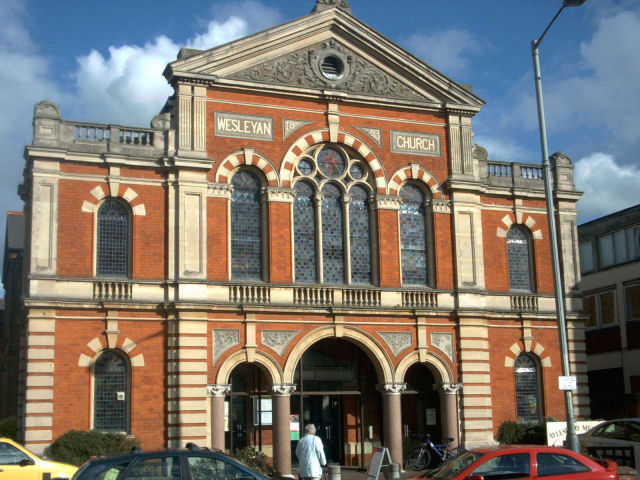
Aylesbury Methodist Church, described by Pevsner as in "terrible Italianate style".

Other places of worship in the town include the remainder of the Congregational Church in the High Street designed by Rowland Plumbe in 1874. It originally had a simple asymmetrical facade though now only the tower remains and is used as offices. In Buckingham Street is the Methodist Church of 1893 designed by James Weir, and described damningly by Pevsner as of a "terrible Italianate style". This description is a little harsh, as the church also displays not only Italianate features but also some Byzantine and Romanesque features too.

In the high street is the Roman Catholic Church dedicated to Saint Joseph built in the 20th century and in Walton is the Holy Trinity Chapel built in 1845.

== 20th century and modernist period ==
=== County Offices ===
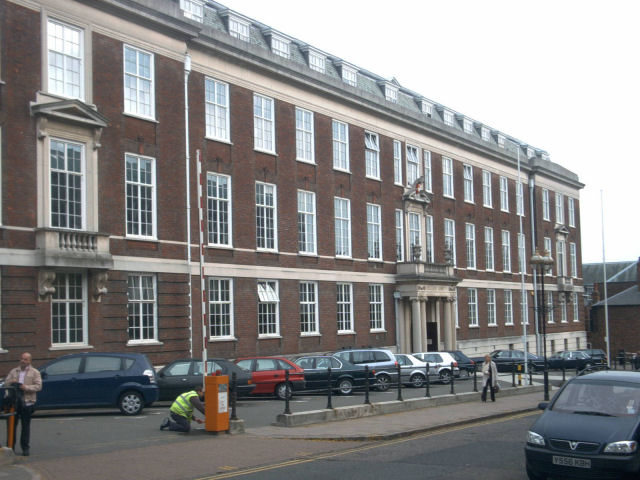
County Offices later known as County Hall

Circa 1929 it was realised that County Hall, and the office complex behind the Corn exchange was too small for the increasing bureaucracy of Buckinghamshire County Council. The county architect C. Riley was commissioned to design a large office block in keeping with the perceived architecture of the town. The resultant County Offices was a three-storey building of 17 bays in an almost Second Empire design. The flat facade is given interest by slight projection of the terminating bays, and a low stone portico at the centre. On the first floor the centre window, and the windows at the centre of the terminating bays were given pediments. Otherwise the facade beneath a mansard roof is unadorned. This unremarkable building, completed in 1939, is indistinguishable from the street architecture found in any English city of that era, and adds little to the market town architecture of Aylesbury. In time the County Offices came themselves to be regarded as the County Hall, as the machinery of the County Court gradually took over the older County Hall in its entirety. If the architecture of the 1930s County Hall was considered out of keeping with the town, 30 years later came an even more, albeit of greater architectural interest, controversial building – Aylesbury's most recent and present County Hall.

=== (New) County Hall ===
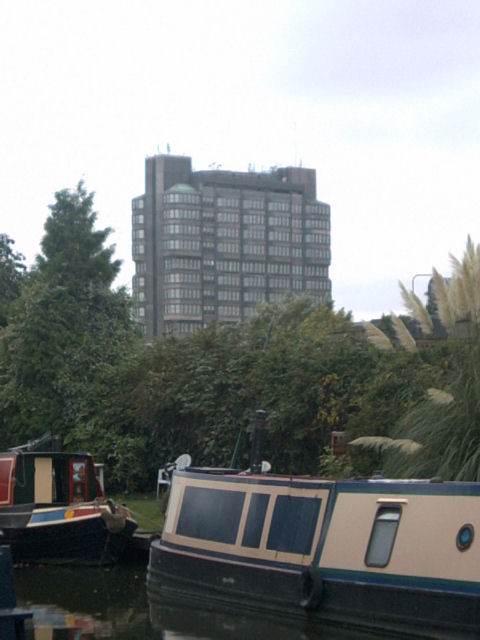
Buckinghamshire County Hall viewed from the Grand Union Canal basin

In the mid-1960s a decision was taken to redevelop and replan a large central part of the town, providing a new shopping centre, bus station, and County Hall. Following Aylesbury's long history of using the "in house" county architect rather than employing a more eminent one, Frederick B. Pooley came to design his most monumental and controversial work. Pooley was experienced in the design of schools having drawn the plans for three educational establishments in the town Quarrendon County Secondary School in 1959, The Grange Secondary Modern School in 1954, and Oak Green Primary School in 1950. Pooley's choice of architecture was Brutalist, an architectural style sometimes referred to as "the celebration of concrete" – its chief building component, the first example of this style in the town. Many old shops and historic buildings were demolished to clear the site. The new town centre was tiered, an underground bus station, had above a three floored department store; while on the same level as the bus station was what was commonly referred to as an underground market – a large hall containing an assortment of small market time stalls and boutiques. Above this was an open pedestrian square around which were larger shops and a cafeteria. The cafeteria in itself was an amazing feat of architectural engineering, as it was built high in stilts, the better to view the 1960s architecture. While this form of town planning is often scorned today, at the time it provided exactly what was required by its consumers, greater shopping choices with easy access and convenient public transport all in a modern environment contrasting with the war time building restrictions which had lingered, in Britain, until the previous decade.

While at the time the people of Aylesbury and the surrounding district were mostly happy with their new shopping centre, more controversial was the new County Hall, the foundation stone of which was laid on 22 October 1964 by Sir Henry Floyd, Lord Lieutenant of Buckinghamshire. This building entirely of concrete and glass stands 200 ft. high and consists of 15 floors. Not particularly remarkable compared to the Sears Tower, but dominating a predominantly 18th century town of low brick houses, it proved to be a conversational piece of architecture. The new County Hall sits above a complex containing the County Reference Library, Aylesbury Register Office, and the County Record Office. Inside it bought together for the first time all the departments and machinations of Buckinghamshire County Council. The building is visible from many villages and towns several miles distant, thus residents of Buckinghamshire are constantly aware of the location of their seat of local Government. Often referred to locally as "Pooley's Folly" (after the architect) the building took just two years to build and was completed in 1966 at a cost of £956,000.

Analytically, if not architecturally, the new County Hall is in keeping with the town's architecture, its design history is as provincial as its more classical predecessors. While its design is a bold conception freely using works by such architects as Frank Lloyd Wright, Le Corbusier and De Stijil and it has similarities to Paul Rudolph's School of Art and Architecture at Yale completed in 1963. However, as early as 1904 Auguste Perret designed a block of flats in the Rue Franklin, Paris which has similar angles, bayed windows and canted recesses to County Hall in Aylesbury, and these flats too were constructed of concrete. With its Brutalist roots in the 1940s, and earlier, Aylesbury's County Hall was, like its classical predecessor, already dated by the time of its 1966 completion: by then architecture was moving on to the cleaner and straighter lines and sheets of plate glass advocated by such architects as Mies van der Rohe. County Hall though does possess identity and boldness of design, and an architectural abrasiveness accentuated by the heavy contrasts of glass and dominating concrete. Today its architectural merit is recognised, and the building is listed for preservation as Grade II. Though never at the cutting thrust and pioneering end of modern architecture, as its patrons required, the new County Hall is now as much a part of the landscape, in its way it is as much part of the provincial architecture as any of its older neighbours. It prevents the town appearing as a time capsule, and represents the reality of a busy, functioning industrial town as opposed to a museum piece which some other historic town centres have become.

=== Jarvis Building ===
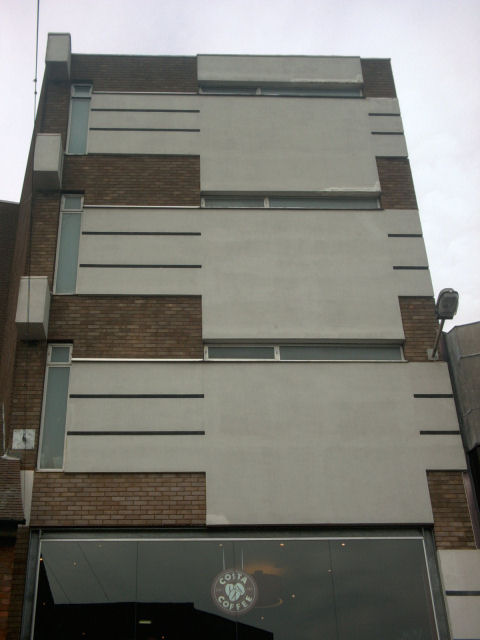
Former department store

The Jarvis building was originally intended to be one wing of a large department store, extending from the High Street to the Market Square. This tower in the High Street, was to have been joined to the original shop with its own 1960s tower (now demolished) in Cambridge Street. This tower (pictured right) was constructed in the 1980s and was given a slightly retrospective 1960s design in order to blend with the now demolished part of the building. Hence can be seen a blending of two modernist styles separated by twenty years. The wooden painted panels beneath the many windows of the 1960s block are here accentuated, almost caricatured, to become the most dominant features of the facade and the windows become of negligible value.

== Late 20th and 21st century architecture ==
During the late 20th century, Aylesbury began to expand industrially at a rapid pace and for the first time established international businesses from outside the immediate vicinity began to relocate to Aylesbury. Besides bringing with them the obvious increased prosperity and employment to the town, for the first time they bought completely contemporary architecture to the town. Aylesbury's architecture now ceased to be provincial.

=== Hampden House ===
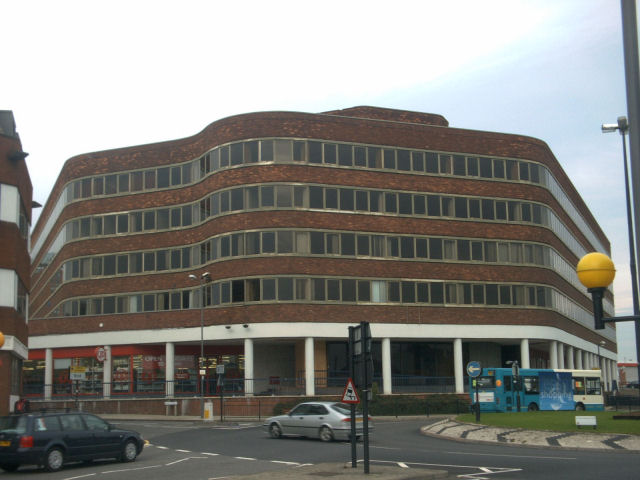
Hampden House

Hampden House at the junction between the High Street and Vale Park Way is one of the town's most interesting modern buildings. It is in a style seldom seen elsewhere. Conceived as an office block for an international company, its curved facades hint at a revival of the Streamline Moderne: this is further enhanced by the upper floors themselves appearing as bands of brickwork and glass. The large store on the ground floor is recessed into a faux arcade of a lighter stonework than the upper floors, providing a mixture of light and shade in an almost Baroque effect of chiaroscuro to the more solid floors above.

=== Equitable Life Building ===
This large office building in Walton Street constructed in 1982, designed by GMW Partnership.

=== Exchange Street Offices ===
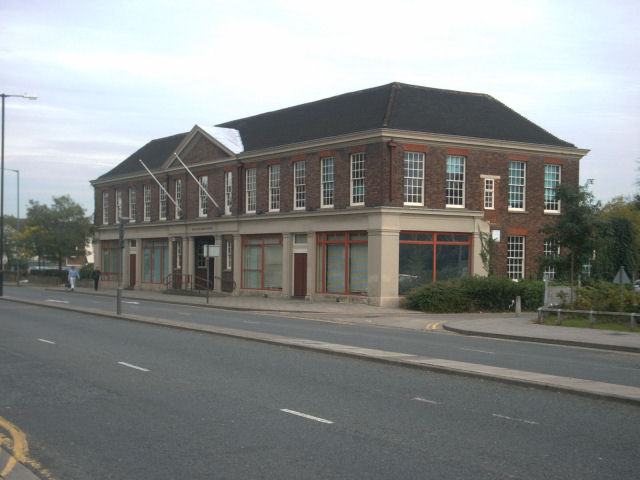
Office block in Aylesbury, now demolished

Today this building known as Aylesbury Vale District Council's Exchange Street Offices is part of the administration centre of the local government. Completed in 1931 This building's original use was industrial – the home of the electricity board. The ground floor being showrooms, with offices above, while at the rear of the building was the power station supplying the town with electricity.

The architecture of the building is a subtle form of the classical united with the Baroque. The sophisticated proportions and design of the building are unusual for a mundane utility building of the early 1930s – a period of general depression when cost and economy of design took precedence over the aesthetics of architecture. The ground floor suggests the open loggias of town architecture of the Renaissance, where open arcades provided covered space for market stalls and vendors, while above was living accommodation. However, here, to suit both the 2oth century and more northern climate, the arcade is closed. The windows above are slim and elongated redolent of those used by such architects as Vanbrugh and Hawksmoor during the English Baroque period of the early 18th century.

The facade is given an importance and a focal point by a low pediment very much in the English Queen Anne style which immediately followed the short lived English Baroque period.

The building was demolished in November 2007 by Aylesbury Vale District Council in order to make way for the new Waterside development.

== Notable buildings that have been demolished ==
Other buildings in Aylesbury have been demolished over the years such as the Church of St John in Cambridge Street and the former Wesleyan Chapel, in Friarage Passage.

Other notable buildings that have disappeared that have not already been mentioned elsewhere in the article include the Railway Hotel (described by Pevsner affectionately as: "an engaging little horror built in 1898") in Great Western Street, the Baptist Chapel in Walton Street, the public baths in Bourbon Street and the Union of London & Smith Bank in High Street.

== Gallery of images ==
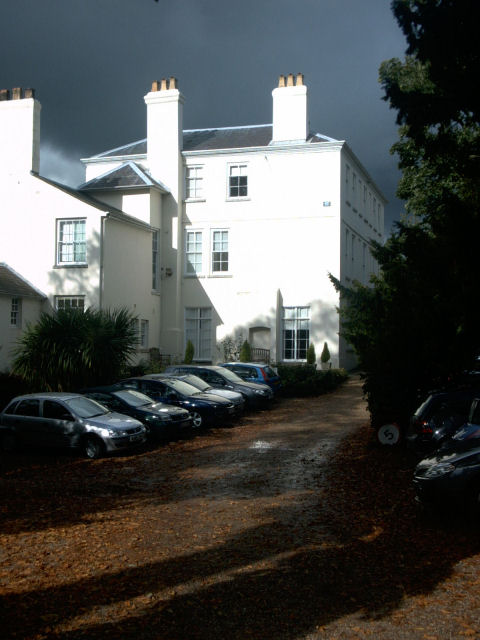
Side view of Prebendal House, former residence of John Wilkes now used as offices

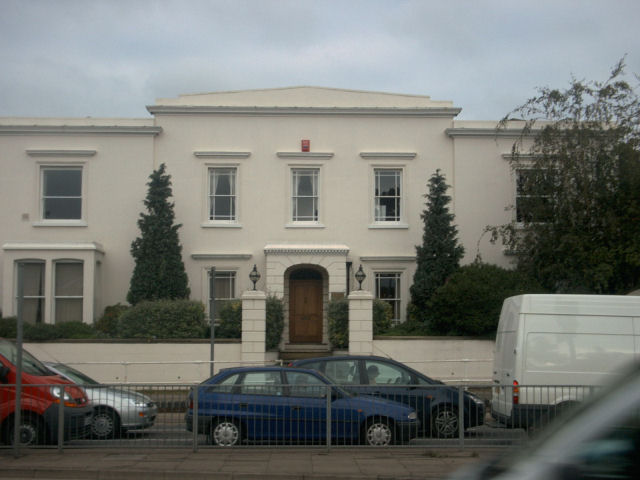
Walton Lodge, Walton – a Grade II listed building

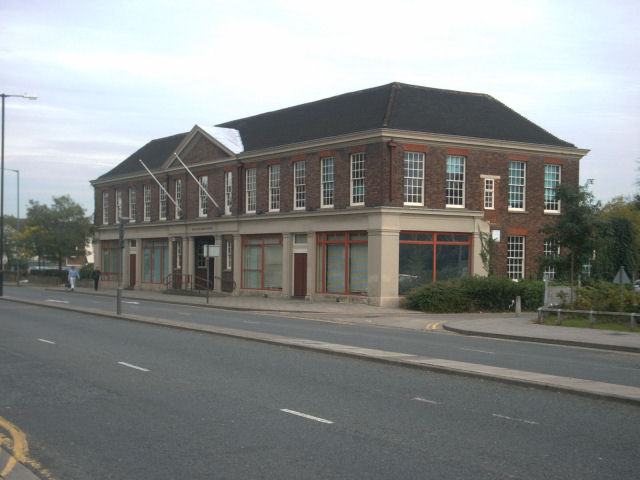
AVDC's Exchange Street Offices. This building's original use was industrial – it was where the electricity board was based with its showrooms (main building) and out the back was the power station. Construction was completed in 1931.

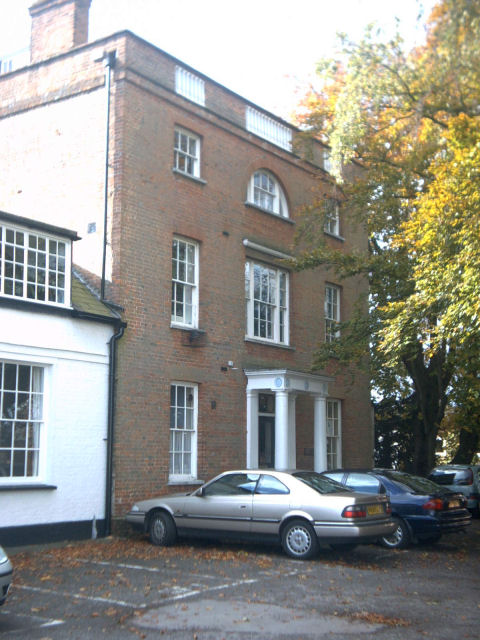
Ardenham House – original use residential, now offices

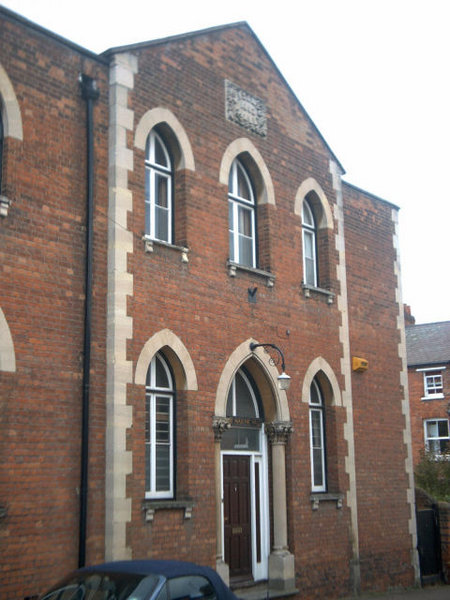
The Masonic Hall in Ripon Street

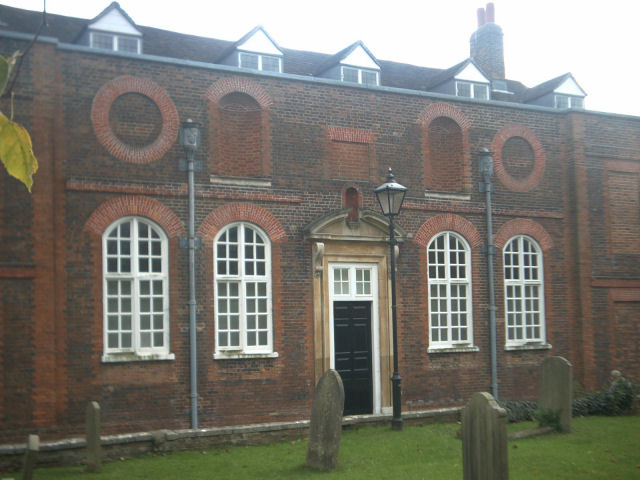
The Old Grammar School in the church square – now part of the Bucks County Museum complex

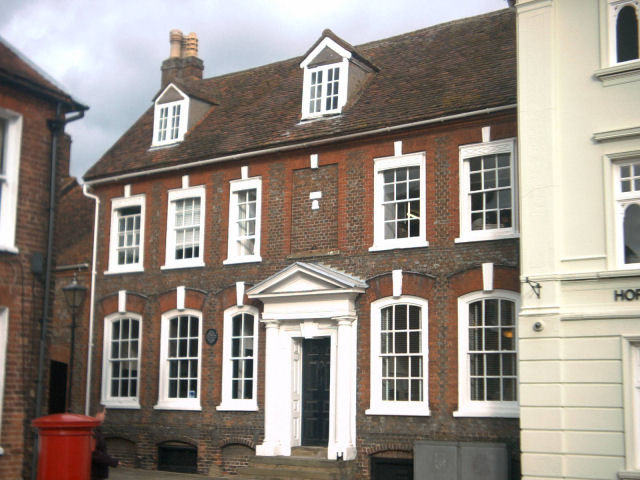
Thomas Hickman's house in Temple Square

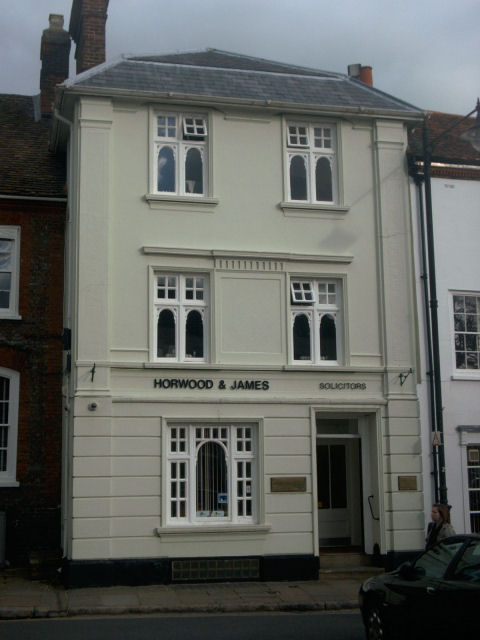
James James's house in Temple Square, he was the founder of the Horwood and James firm that still occupies the building

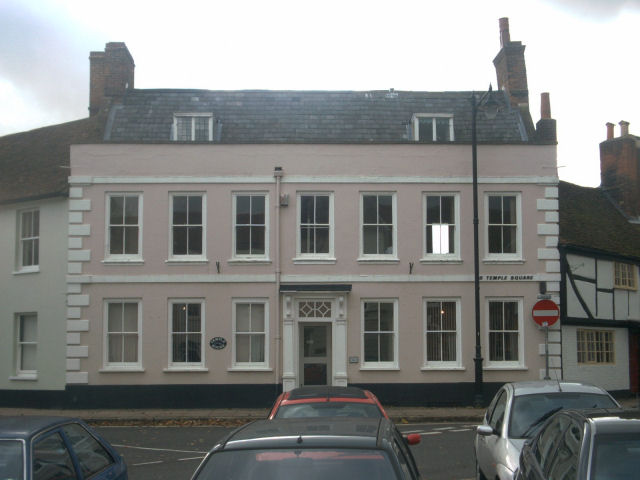
Another house in Temple Square

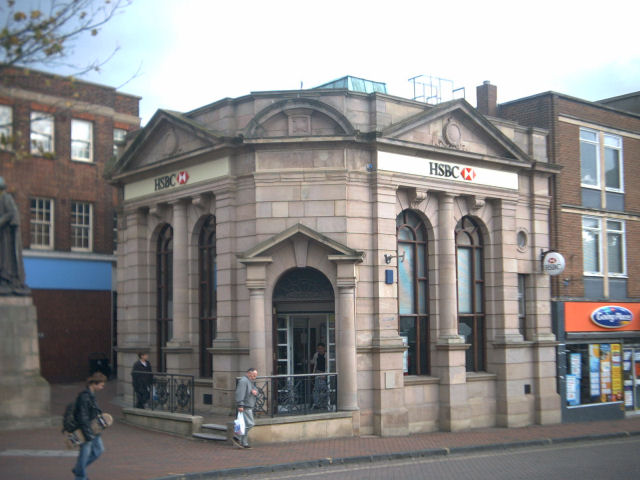
The HSBC bank in Market Square

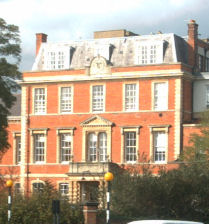
Part of the Royal Bucks Hospital

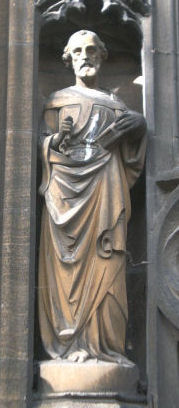
One of the statues on the south door of St Mary's

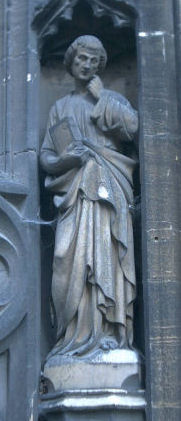
The other statue

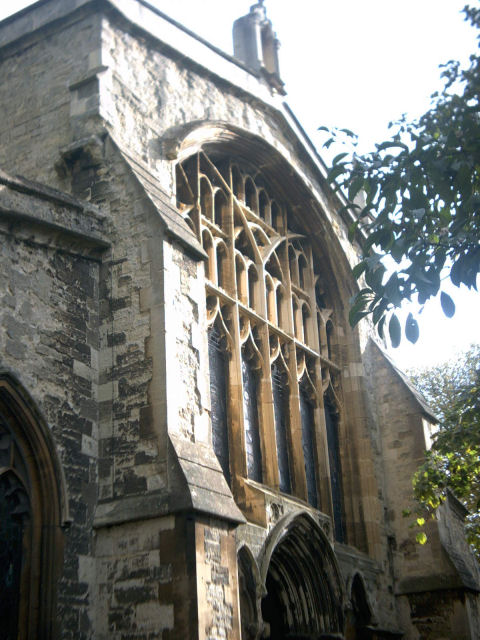
The west window

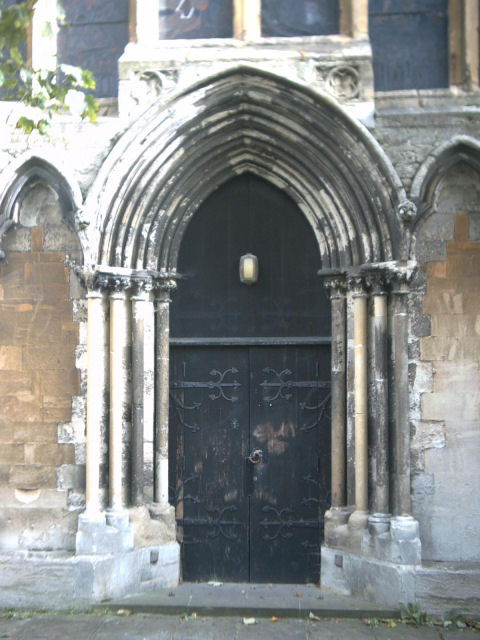
The west door

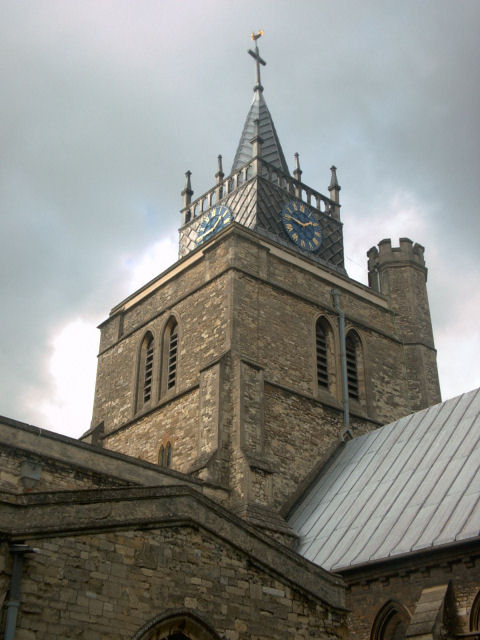
Detail of the tower and spire
