= Fred Pooley =

British architect

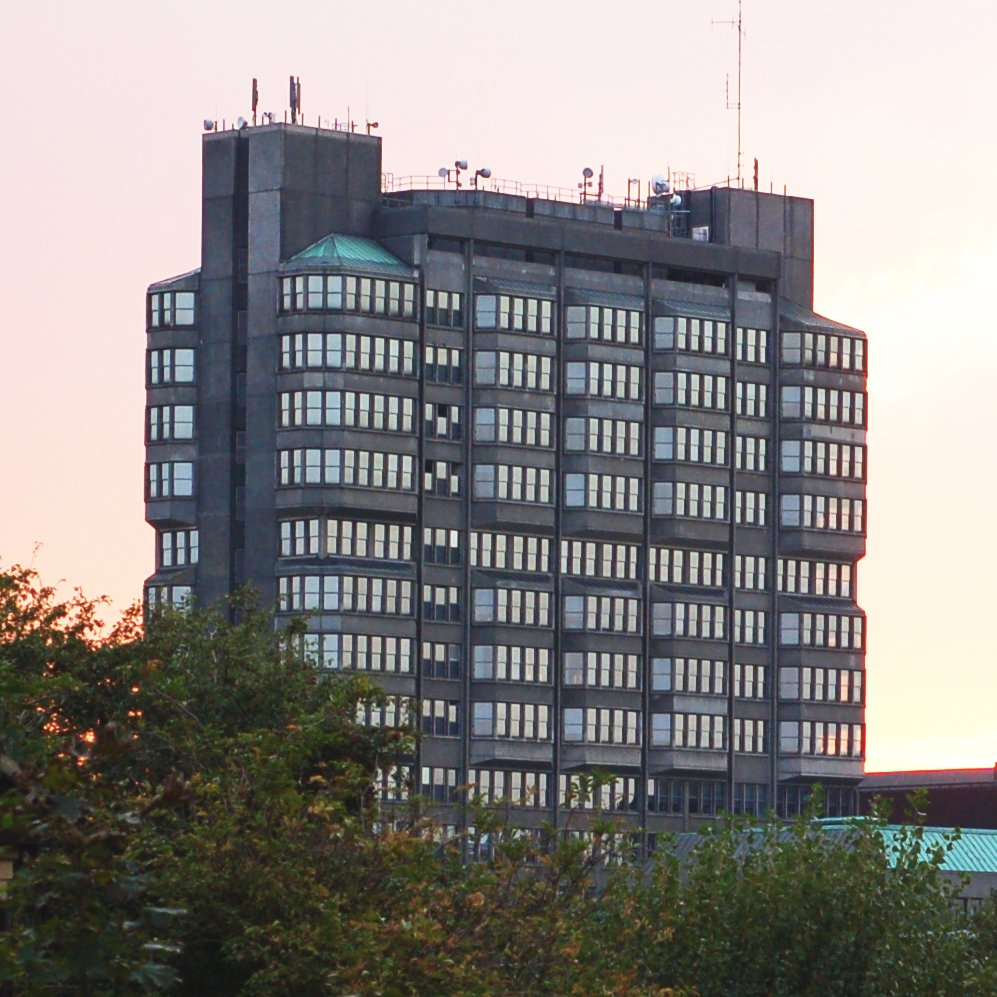
- Pooley's Buckinghamshire County Hall in Aylesbury
- Born: 18 April 1916
- Died: 11 March 1998 (aged 81)
- Occupation: Architect
- Spouse: Hilda
- Children: Three daughters

Frederick Bernard Pooley CBE (18 April 1916 – 11 March 1998) is best known as the county architect of Buckinghamshire, and for his futuristic monorail proposals for a new town in north Bucks that eventually became Milton Keynes. Pooley was born in West Ham, east London and trained at the Northern Polytechnic in the evenings, while working in the West Ham engineer's department by day. He qualified as an architect, planner and surveyor before serving with the Royal Engineers during World War II. He also qualified as a structural engineer and arbitrator.

Pooley was a supporter of mid-ranking architects and ensured that project architects' names were put on all Buckinghamshire County Council buildings, and not just that of the county architect, promoting this idea to the wider profession. He was noted for his strong support of public transport, firstly for his monorail proposals for the new city that became Milton Keynes, and later for his later role in Greater London, where he identified the growing problem of the impact of traffic on the city.

== Career ==
After the Second World War, Pooley joined the borough of West Ham as deputy architect and planner and then moved to Coventry in the same role where he helped plan the country's first pedestrianised city centre. In 1953 he moved to Buckinghamshire County Council to become County Architect.

Following his modern work in West Ham and Coventry, and his dramatic 1966 county hall building in Aylesbury, his architectural style became restrained; being more contextual and rural, predominately being brick with pitched roofs.

In 1973 he became president of the Royal Institute of British Architects for two years. As well has sorting out various conflicts within the institute, he used his time to promote the broader benefits of architects at all levels of government, and in 1974 he was quoted in Parliament by Sydney Chapman with regards to the boom and bust construction cycles: "The hand operated tap that used to produce stop-go in the building industry must be replaced by an automatic ball valve designed to allow sufficient work to flow to the industry to keep it working at the right level."

One of Pooley's last important works for the county was the establishment of Buckingham as a university town, which eventually became Buckingham University, Britain's first independent university. He also created the Buckingham Development Company to regulate and enable development around the small market town.

Due to the local government reorganisation in 1974, he left Buckinghamshire County Council for a new role of Controller of Transport and Planning at the Greater London Council In 1978 he took on the additional responsibility of architecture after the post of Architect to the GLC, held by Sir Roger Walters, was not filled. One of his successes was how he badgered the railway authorities into creating Thameslink. He was also involved with resolving major developments around London including Piccadilly, Liverpool Street, St Katharine's Dock, and took part in the initiation of the London Docklands development. He retired in 1980.

The Architects' Journal said of Pooley: "Liked by almost everyone who worked with him, he was a quiet-voiced pragmatist – but one whose leaps of imagination could surprise".

== Personal life ==
Pooley married Hilda Dyer in 1944. They had three daughters and lived in Whiteleaf, outside Aylesbury, Buckinghamshire.

== Notable buildings and projects ==
- Beaconsfield Library (1957)
- Chalfonts Community College (1961)
- Plan for Aylesbury town centre (1962)
- Royal Latin School New Block, Buckingham (1963)
- County Hall, Aylesbury (1966). A 12-storey tower that became known as "Fred's Fort" and "Pooley's Folly"
- Chalfont St Peter library (1966)
- Lady Spencer Churchill College of Education, Wheatley, Oxfordshire (1966). Now Oxford Brookes University, Wheatley Campus (acquired 1976).
- North Bucks New City. Precursor to Milton Keynes, based on a monorail connecting high density residential areas with a central core, sometimes referred to as "Pooleyville"
- Prototype mini-home, Buckingham (1970)
- The Walnuts School, Simpson, Milton Keynes (1970)
- Milton Keynes Development Corporation offices, Wavenden Tower, Milton Keynes

== Awards ==
He was appointed CBE in 1968.
