= HM Prison Aylesbury =

Prison in Aylesbury, England

Coordinates: 51.8220°N 0.7997°W

HMP Aylesbury
- HMP Aylesbury, shortly after construction in 1847
- Interactive map of HMP Aylesbury
- Location: Aylesbury, Buckinghamshire
- Security class: category C
- Capacity: 402
- Population: 395 (February 2023)
- Opened: 1847
- Managed by: HM Prison Services
- Governor: Kevin Marshall-Clarke
- Website: Aylesbury at justice.gov.uk

His Majesty's Prison Aylesbury is a category C training prison situated in Aylesbury, Buckinghamshire, England. It is located on the north side of the town centre, on Bierton Road and is operated by His Majesty's Prison Service.

== History ==
There has been a prison or gaol of some description in Aylesbury since 1810. The current prison has been on its present site since 1847. It is of early Victorian design and was modelled on Reading County Gaol, The site was in an area of public buildings that also included the workhouse (formerly the Tindal Centre) and the Manor House Hospital.

Since construction, the prison has gone through a variety of changes, starting as a county gaol, then became an adult women's prison in 1890, changing to a girls' borstal in the 1930s, and between 1959 and 1961 was an adult male prison, after which it became a male YOI, and since 1989 has held only male long-term prisoners.

== Operation ==
In 1998 HMP Aylesbury was criticised after an inspection report highlighted its poor health regime, which saw the rapid turnover of five senior medical officers in two years. The report opened up a wider debate about the pay of medical staff in UK prisons compared to those in the NHS.

In 2001 the Imam for HMP Aylesbury was suspended after allegations of inappropriate comments after the September 11 New York terror attacks. A year after this a study of prisoners' diets at Aylesbury (conducted by Surrey University) found that adding vitamins, minerals and other nutritional elements to the diets of prisoners 'remarkably' reduced their antisocial behaviour.

HMP Aylesbury prison was back in the headlines in 2007 after it was revealed to have a higher rate of self-harm by inmates than any other Young Offenders Institution in England Following the introduction of the Prison Service's ACCT (Assessment, Care in Custody, and Teamwork) system the rate of self-harm has reduced significantly.

In December 2008, police officers and Prison Service 'Tornado Teams' were called in to contain a disturbance at Aylesbury Prison, officially described as a 'Concerted Indiscipline'. The incident lasted six hours, and involved a number of inmates who were taking part in Eid celebrations. A number of these were charged with 'Prison Mutiny'.

In November 2009, a Prison Officer from HMYOI Aylesbury was jailed after it emerged that she had become pregnant after having a sexual relationship with an inmate. The Prison Officer was also convicted of smuggling three mobile phones into HMYOI Aylesbury.

== The prison today ==
Aylesbury holds prisoners as cat C between the ages of 18 and 40. Accommodation comprises single cells in seven residential wings and one segregation unit.

There are full and part-time education programmes at the prison, which range from basic and key skills courses up to Art, French and Sociology at A Level and Physical Education. Vocational courses and work programmes include Construction, Painting and Decorating, Bricklaying, Motor Vehicle Mechanics, Industrial and General Cleaning, Laundry, Catering, Gardening and Waste management. Young Offenders also have opportunities to pursue award-based courses including the Duke of Edinburgh's Award.

In February 2013 HMP Aylesbury appeared in an ITV documentary focusing on the lives of inmates and officers.

In July 2017 a serious violent incident took place involving many inmates and Prison Officers were injured some needing hospital treatment. In April 2018, a riot occurred, hospitalising four Prison Officers. Prisoners were frustrated because they spent the whole week locked in their cells and only had one chance a week to shower.

== Notable inmates ==
=== Former inmates ===
==== Women ====
- Violet Bland, Suffragette imprisoned and force-fed in 1912. She wrote of her experiences in Votes for Women.
- Kitty Byron, convicted in 1902 of murdering her lover Arthur Reginald Baker, was released from Aylesbury in December 1908.
- Edith Carew convicted in 1897 in the British Court for Japan in Yokohama for murdering by poisoning her husband, Walter Carew. Carew was transferred from Yokohama (via Hong Kong) in 1897 and released in 1910
- Mathilde Carré, a French Resistance agent during World War II who turned double agent. Carré was held at Aylesbury for the last years of the war where she acted as an informant against other detainees. Carré was deported to France after the war ended.
- Constance Markievicz, first woman MP, commuted death sentence 1916 following the Easter Rising, released 1917.
- Florence Maybrick, a former United States citizen who was imprisoned at Aylesbury for murdering her considerably older English husband. Maybrick was released in 1904.
- Eileen Mackenney, author of "Borstal Girl" was an inmate from 1949 - 1951

==== Men ====
- Jade Braithwaite was at HMYOI Aylesbury for a time after being convicted of the murder of 16-year-old Ben Kinsella. He was ordered to serve a minimum of 19 years.
- Ryan Herbert was transferred to HMYOI Aylesbury from HMP Stoke Heath in 2012, he was convicted in 2008 of killing Sophie Lancaster and sentenced to 15 and a half years
