= Buckinghamshire Council =

Local authority in England

- Council logo

Type
- Type: Unitary authority

History
- Founded: 1 April 2020 (Note: It was formed in 1889 as "Buckinghamshire County Council" then reformed with different boundaries in 1974 as "Buckinghamshire County Council" then reformed with the same boundaries as "Buckinghamshire Council" in 2020.)
- Preceded by: Buckinghamshire County Council

Leadership
- Chair: John Chilver, Conservative since 20 May 2026
- Leader: Steve Broadbent, Conservative since 21 May 2025
- Chief Executive: Zina Etheridge since April 2026

Structure
- Seats: 97
- Political groups: Administration (50) Conservative (50) Other parties (47) Liberal Democrat (26) Independent (12) Labour (3) Reform UK (2) Green (2) Wycombe Independents (2)

Elections
- Voting system: First past the post
- Last election: 1 May 2025
- Next election: May 2029

Meeting place
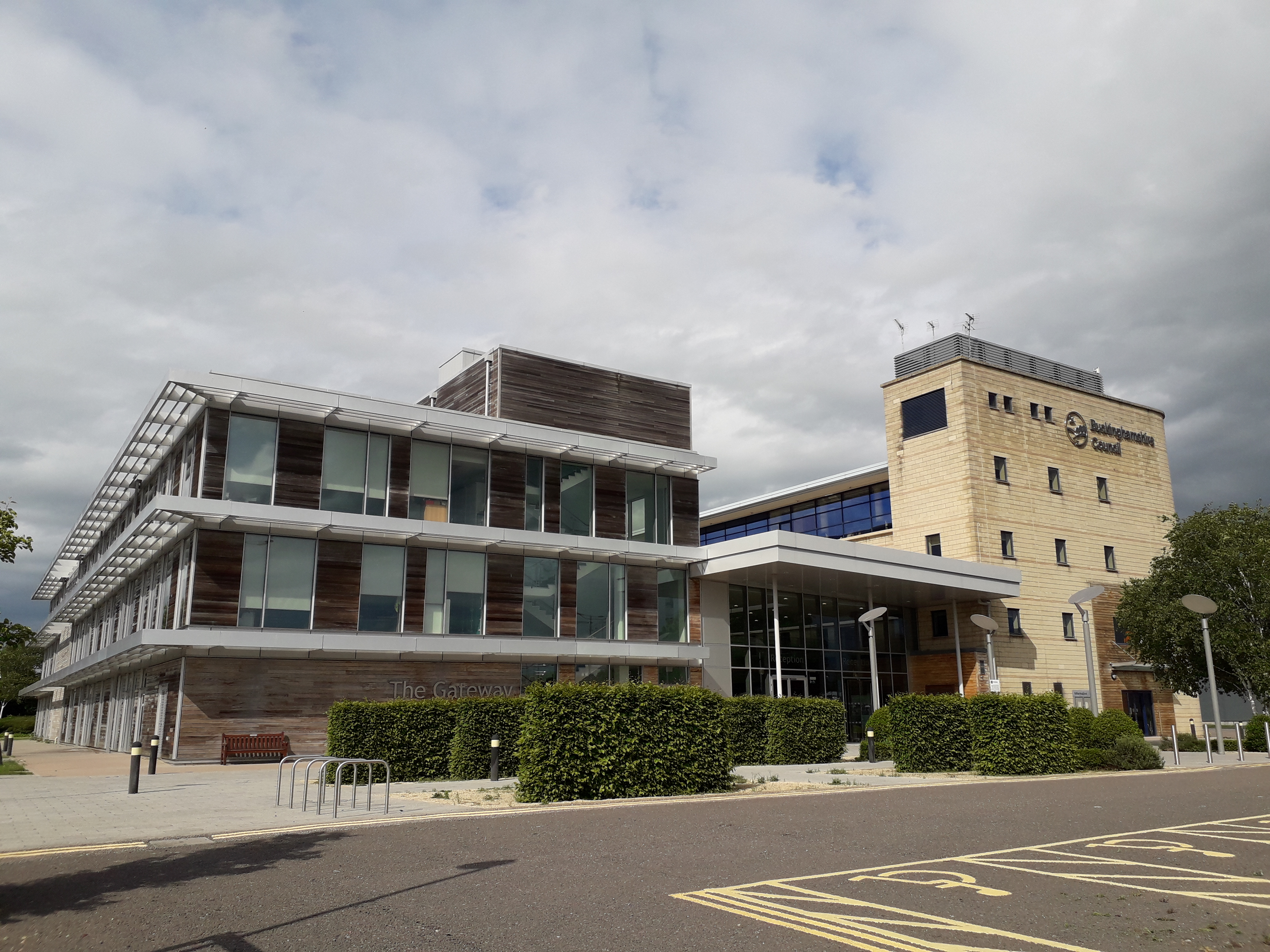
- The Gateway, Gatehouse Road, Aylesbury, Buckinghamshire, HP19 8FF

Website
- www.buckinghamshire.gov.uk

Buckinghamshire Council is the local authority for the Buckinghamshire district in England. It is a unitary authority, performing both county and district-level functions. It was created on 1 April 2020, replacing the previous Buckinghamshire County Council and the councils of the four abolished districts of Aylesbury Vale, Chiltern, South Bucks, and Wycombe. The district, which is also legally a non-metropolitan county, covers about four-fifths of the area and has about two-thirds of the population of the wider ceremonial county of Buckinghamshire, which also includes the City of Milton Keynes.

The county council had been established in 1889. The county was reformed in 1974, when it ceded Slough, Eton and nearby villages to Berkshire. In 1997, the Borough of Milton Keynes was detached to become a non-metropolitan county in its own right.

The council has had a Conservative majority since a change of allegiance in January 2026, having previously been under no overall control since the 2025 election. Prior to the 2025 election, the council had been under majority Conservative control from its creation, as had been the predecessor county council between the reforms of 1974 and its abolition in 2020.

== History ==
=== County council ===
Elected county councils were created in 1889 under the Local Government Act 1888, taking over administrative functions which had previously been performed by unelected magistrates at the quarter sessions.

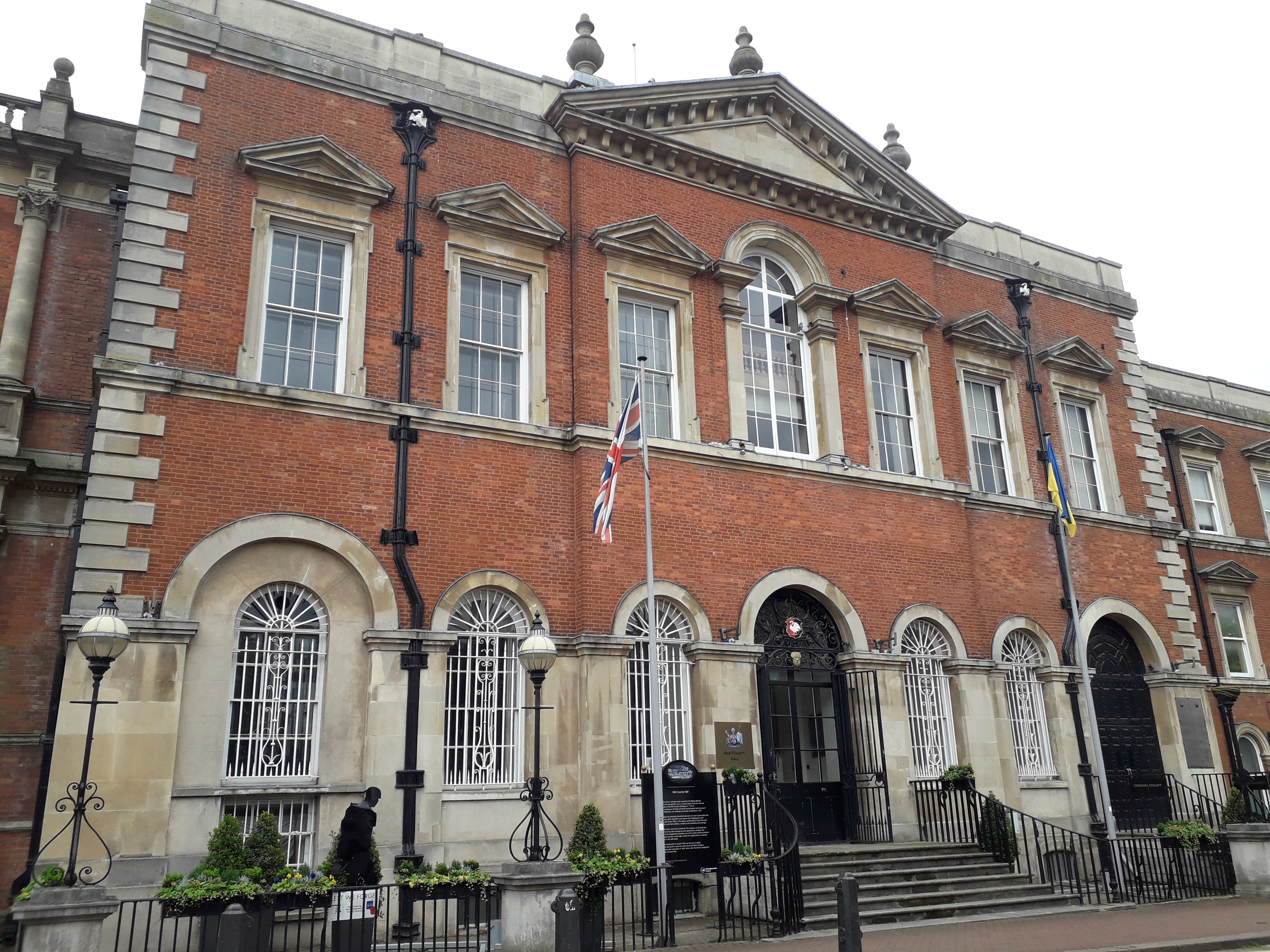
Old County Hall, Aylesbury: County Council's meeting place 1889–2012

The first elections were held in January 1889 and the county council formally came into being on 1 April 1889, on which day it held its first meeting at County Hall in Aylesbury, the courthouse (completed 1740) which had served as the meeting place for the quarter sessions which preceded the county council. The first chairman was Henry William Cripps, a QC from Marlow, who was also chairman of the quarter sessions.

There were occasional changes to the county's boundaries, notably following the Local Government Act 1894, which said that parishes and districts could no longer straddle county boundaries. Linslade was transferred to Bedfordshire in 1965.

Buckinghamshire was redesignated as a non-metropolitan county in 1974 under the Local Government Act 1972, which also transferred Slough, Eton, and nearby villages to Berkshire. Until 1974 the lower tier of local government comprised numerous municipal boroughs, urban districts and rural districts. They were also reorganised as part of the 1974 reforms into five non-metropolitan districts: Aylesbury Vale, Chiltern, Milton Keynes, South Bucks (called 'Beaconsfield' until 1980), and Wycombe.

In 1997 the borough of Milton Keynes was removed from the non-metropolitan county to become its own unitary authority. The City of Milton Keynes remains part of the ceremonial county of Buckinghamshire for the purposes of lieutenancy.

Between 2016 and 2019 the government considered options for introducing unitary forms of local government across the whole county. The county council proposed abolishing the four remaining districts in its area and having one unitary authority. The four districts proposed instead one unitary authority covering Aylesbury Vale and another covering the combined area of Chiltern, South Bucks and Wycombe. The government ultimately decided to pursue the single unitary authority as proposed by the county council. The three southern districts considered seeking a judicial review of the government's decision, but ultimately decided against. The statutory instrument confirming the changes was issued in May 2019.

On 12 March 2020, the last meeting of the county council took place, during which the council celebrated 131 years of service.

=== Unitary authority ===
A shadow authority was established to oversee the transition to the new council, comprising all 202 councillors from the old county council and four district councils. The new unitary authority formally came into being on 1 April 2020.

The first elections to the new council had been due to be held in May 2020, but due to the COVID-19 pandemic the first election was postponed until the 2021 local elections. It was therefore announced on 18 March 2020 that all the current shadow authority members would automatically become councillors and the shadow executive members would form the cabinet. They would stay in post until the inaugural election took place in May 2021.

== Governance ==
Map of Buckinghamshire Council within the ceremonial county of Buckinghamshire

As a unitary authority, Buckinghamshire Council provides both district-level and county-level functions. Legally, it is a district council which also performs the functions of a county council. Most of its area is also covered by civil parishes, which form an additional tier of local government for their areas. The only exception is High Wycombe, which is an unparished area; the Buckinghamshire councillors for the town serve as charter trustees instead of it having a town council.

=== Political control ===
The council has had a Conservative majority since a change of allegiance in January 2026, which saw the party regain the majority it had lost at the 2025 election, after which the Conservatives had been the largest party and had formed a minority administration.

From the reforms of 1974 until its abolition in 2020, the Conservatives held a majority of the seats on the county council. They held a majority of the seats on the new council from its formation in 2020 until 2025. On 19 January 2026, Reform UK Councillor Kathy Gibbon defected to the Conservatives, giving them overall control of the council.

Buckinghamshire County Council

Party in control	Years
Conservative	1974–2020

Buckinghamshire Council

Party in control	Years
Conservative	2020–2025
No overall control	2025–2026
Conservative	2026–present

=== Leadership ===
The leaders of the county council from 2001 until its abolition in 2020 were:

Councillor	Party	From	To
David Shakespeare	Conservative	28 Jun 2001	26 May 2011
Martin Tett	Conservative	26 May 2011	31 Mar 2020

As leader of the outgoing county council, Martin Tett automatically became leader of the shadow authority set up in 2019 to oversee the transition. He remained leader when the shadow authority was converted into the new Buckinghamshire Council on 1 April 2020. The leaders since 2020 have been:

Councillor	Party	From	To
Martin Tett	Conservative	1 Apr 2020	21 Apr 2025
Steve Broadbent	Conservative	21 Apr 2025	

=== Composition ===
Following the 2025 local elections, and a subsequent change of allegiance later in May 2025, and then again in January 2026, the composition of the council was:

Party	Councillors
Conservative	49
Liberal Democrats	27
Independent	12
Labour	3
Reform UK	3
Green	2
Wycombe Independent	2
Total	97

The Labour, Green, Wycombe Independent, and independent councillors form the 'Impact Alliance' group. The next election is due in 2029.

== Elections ==
From May 2025, elections are to be held every four years. New ward boundaries were drawn up to come into effect from the 2025 election, reducing the number of councillors to 97. There are now 49 wards, each electing between one and three councillors. Before that, the council also had 49 wards, but each of them elected three councillors, making a total of 147.

== Premises ==
The council has its headquarters and meeting place at The Gateway on Gatehouse Road in Aylesbury, being the former Aylesbury Vale District Council building, prior to which it was offices of Rexel. The building had been built in the 1990s as offices and was bought and substantially extended in 2008–2009 by Aylesbury Vale District Council, with the extensions including a council chamber.

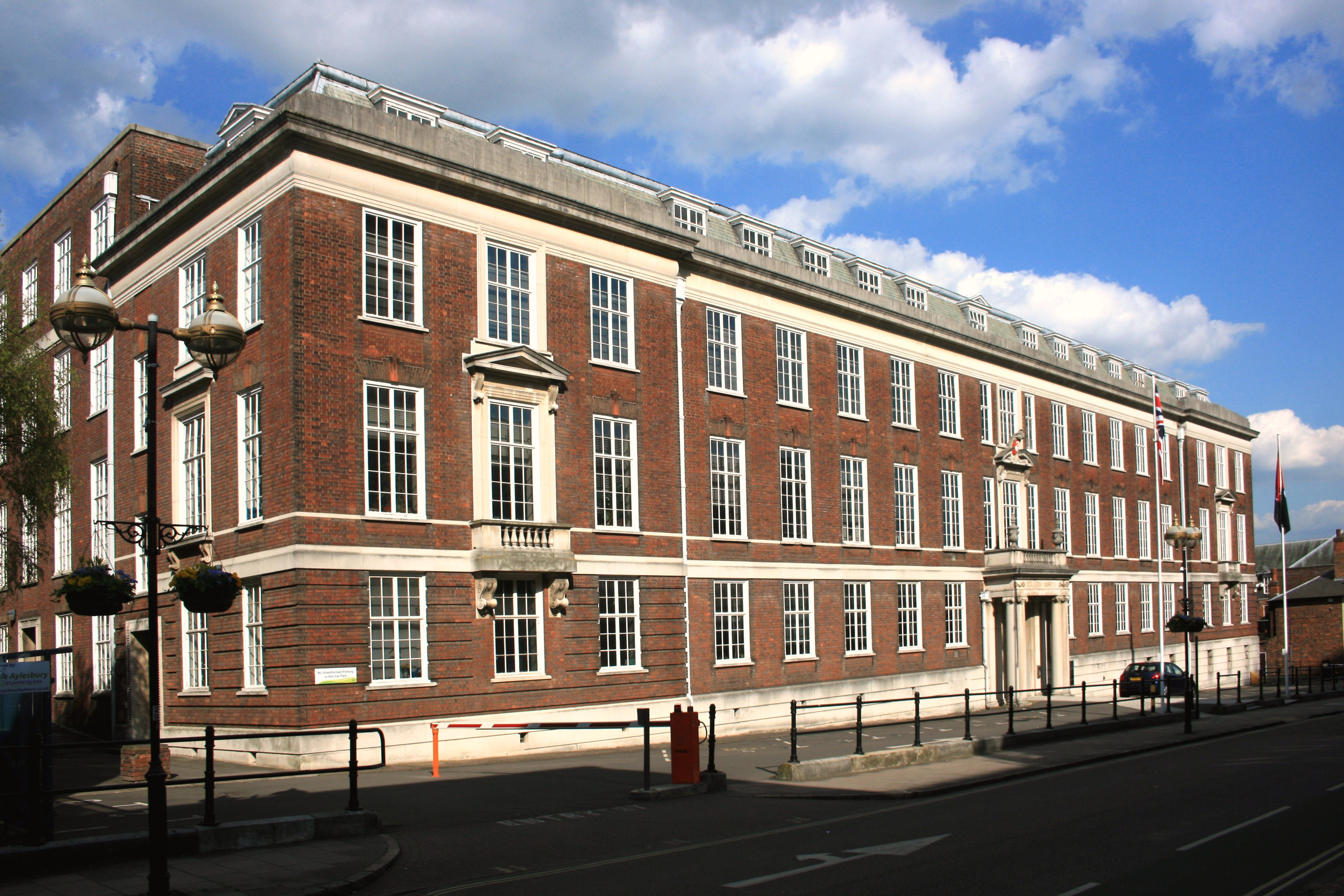
County Offices, Walton Street, Aylesbury, built 1929

For most of its existence, the county council met at the old County Hall in the Market Square in Aylesbury. As the council's responsibilities grew, it needed additional office space. A new building called County Offices was built on Walton Street in 1929, immediately behind County Hall.

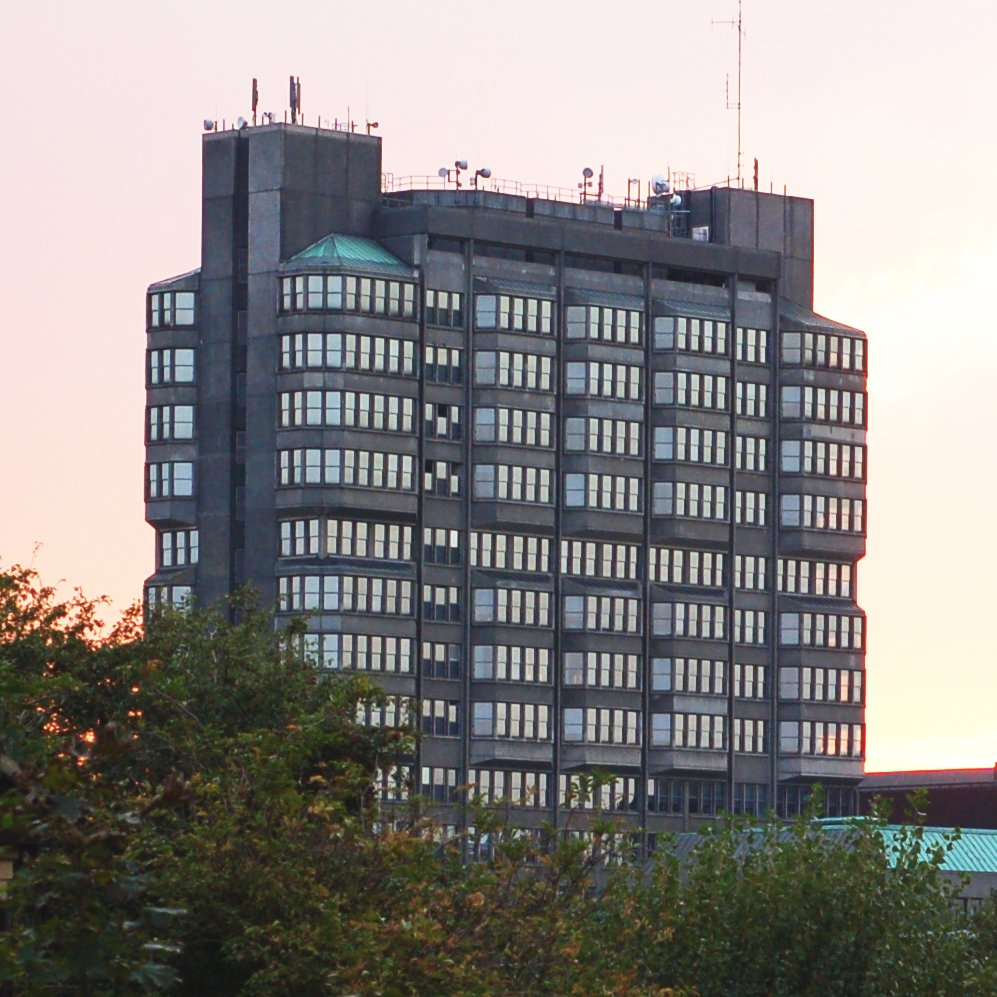
New County Hall, Walton Street, Aylesbury, completed 1966

A much larger office building was built on Walton Street opposite the County Offices in 1964–1966, known as New County Offices or New County Hall, being a 12-storey tower block designed by the county architect, Fred Pooley. The building also became known as "Fred's Fort", or less flatteringly as "Pooley's Folly".

At the basement floor of the County Hall comprises the record office for Buckinghamshire, which is known as Buckinghamshire Archives formerly the Centre for Buckinghamshire Studies, renamed on 1 July 2020, exactly three months after the launch of the new unitary authority. It houses various collections and historical records within Buckinghamshire as well as Milton Keynes and the Paralympics.

Neither of the Walton Street buildings included a council chamber. Full council meetings continued to be held at the Old County Hall until 2012, when the council started meeting at the new council chamber that Aylesbury Vale District Council had built at The Gateway. When Buckinghamshire County Council and the constituent districts merged to become a unitary authority in 2020, consideration was given to where the new council should be based. One option considered was the creation of a council chamber within New County Hall. It was decided instead that the Aylesbury Vale District Council building at The Gateway should be the new council's headquarters, with New County Hall continuing to be used as additional office space.

In late 2023, the council confirmed the planned sale of the former Chiltern District Council building in Amersham, potentially to be followed by the New County Hall tower block in Aylesbury.

== Coat of arms ==
Arms of Buckinghamshire County Council 2022-Present

Buckinghamshire Council received a grant of arms from the College of Arms on 11 November 2022. They are blazoned as follows:

Per pale Gules and Sable a Swan wings displayed and inverted proper gorged with a Coronet attached thereto a Chain reflexed over the back and terminating in an Annulet issuant from the base of a Bordure Or in chief and conjoined to the border a Barrulet wavy also Or. And for the Crest on a Helm with Wreath Argent Gules and Sable Within a circlet of six Roundels four manifest Argent a Beech Tree proper crowned with a Saxon Crown Or Mantled dexter Gules and sinister Sable lined Argent. Supporters: On either side a Fallow Buck guardant proper that on the dexter resting the dexter forefoot on the hilt of a Bronze Age Sword erect proper that on the sinister supporting with the sinister foreleg a Civic Mace Or both on a Compartment comprising a Chalk-edged Grassy Mount cut in the centre foreground with the Whyteleaf Cross all proper.

These replaced the arms granted to Buckinghamshire County Council on 23 March 1948:

Arms of Buckinghamshire County Council 1948-2020

Arms: Per pale Gules and Sable a Swan rousant proper ducally gorged with Chain reflexed over the back Or on a Chief of the last a Roundel per chevron a Cross at the point Vert and Argent.

Crest: On a Wreath of the Colours on a Mount a Beech Tree eradicated proper enfiled with a Saxon Crown Or.

Supporters: On the dexter side a Stag and on the sinister side a Swan rousant both proper.

== Logo ==
The logo until 2020

The logo of the new Buckinghamshire Council consists of a blue circle with a white swan flying above hills, with a row of three trees. The words 'Buckinghamshire Council' and 'est.2020' are written above and below respectively. The old logo of Buckinghamshire County Council was a swan in a black circle.

== Notable members ==
- Frederick Verney (1846–1913), member from 1889 to 1907
- Tonman Mosley, 1st Baron Anslow (1850–1933), Chairman from 1904 to 1921
- Sir William Carlile, 1st Baronet (1862–1950)
- William Joseph Ashby (1885–1953)
- Sir Henry Aubrey-Fletcher, 6th Baronet (1887–1969)
- Sir Aubrey Ernest Ward (1899–1987), Chairman from 1963 to 1974
- Edward Curzon, 6th Earl Howe (1908–1984), Vice-Chairman 1974 to 1978
- John Darling Young (1910–1988)
- Sir Ralph Verney, 5th Baronet (1915–2001)
- Guthrie Moir (1917–1993), member from 1949 to 1975
- Brian White (1957–2016), later member of parliament for Milton Keynes

== See also ==
- 2019–2023 structural changes to local government in England
- Buckinghamshire Archives
