= County Hall, Aylesbury =

County building in Aylesbury, Buckinghamshire, England

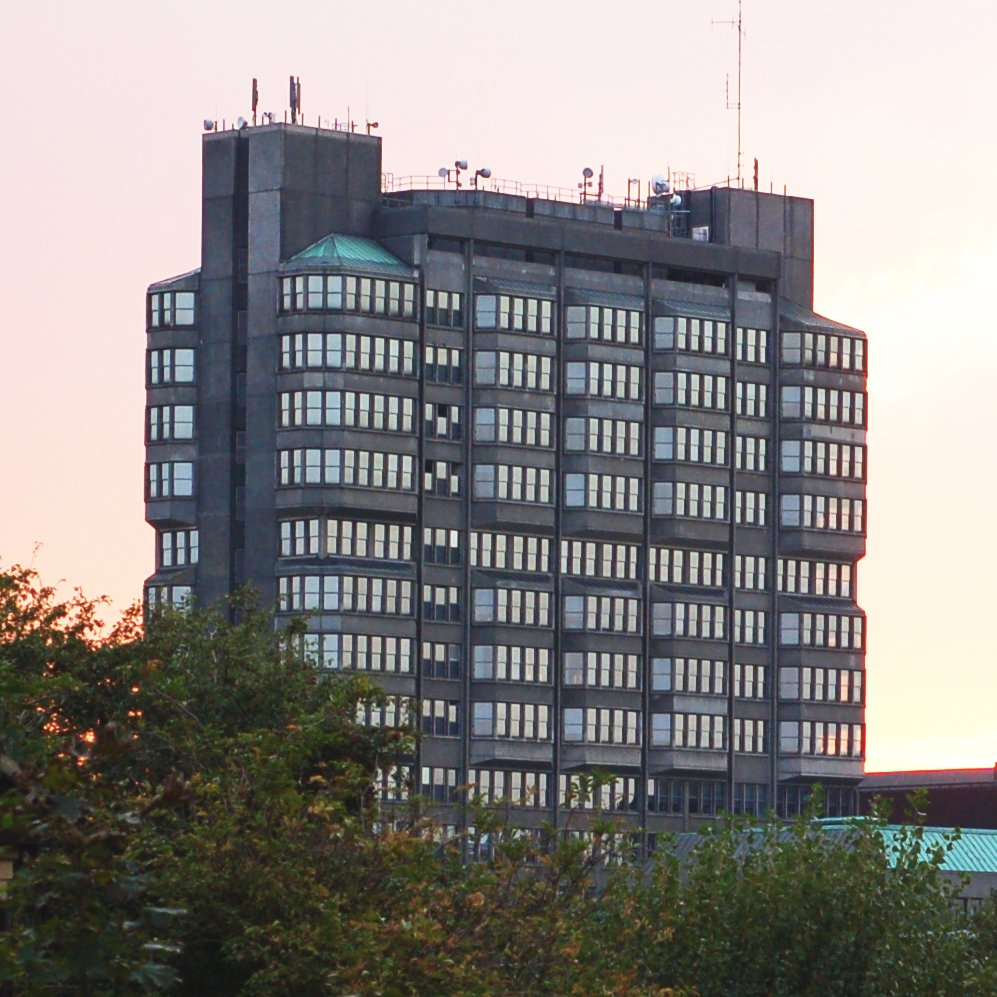
- County Hall

- Location within Buckinghamshire

General information
- Architectural style: Brutalist style
- Location: Aylesbury, United Kingdom
- Coordinates: 51.81461°N 0.81206°W
- Completed: 1966

Height
- Height: 200 ft (61 m)

Technical details
- Floor count: 15

Design and construction
- Architect: Fred Pooley

County Hall is a high-rise tower block in Walton Street in Aylesbury, in the county of Buckinghamshire in England. It was built to house the former Buckinghamshire County Council. Following local government reorganisation in 2020 the building is now owned by Buckinghamshire Council. County Hall continues to be used as offices by the new council, but meetings of the council are held at The Gatehouse in Aylesbury, the former offices of Aylesbury Vale District Council.

== History ==
The original County Hall in Aylesbury was an 18th-century building in Market Square.

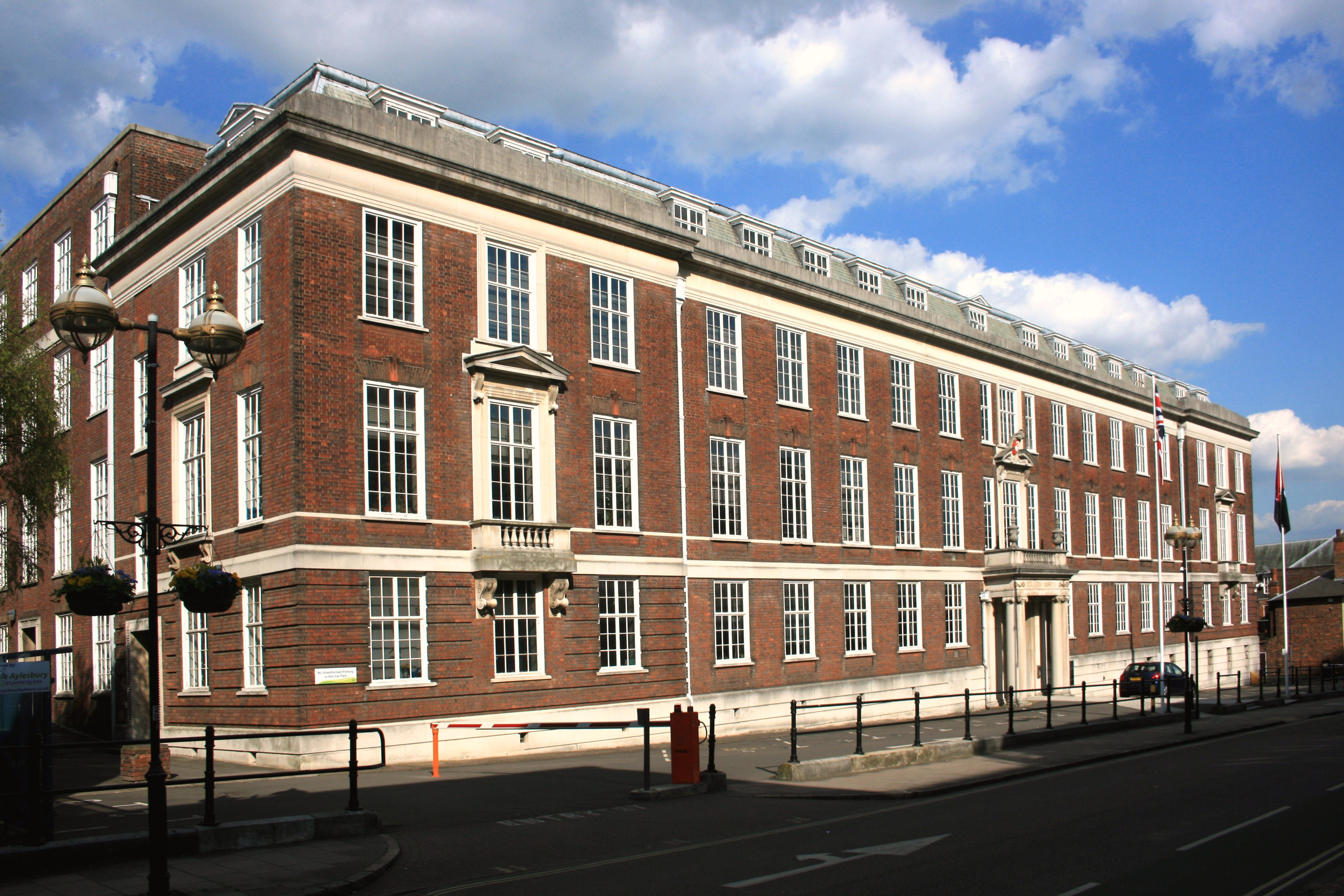
County Offices, built 1929

In 1929 a building called "County Offices" was erected on Walton Street in Aylesbury, which served as the council's main offices in conjunction with the nearby County Hall.

After deciding that the old County Hall and County Offices were inadequate for their needs, county leaders chose to procure a new county headquarters: the site selected was directly opposite the County Offices on Walton Street, and had previously been occupied by a residential property known as "Willowbank" and later as "the Old House".

The foundation stone of the new concrete and glass County Hall was laid by the Lord Lieutenant of Buckinghamshire, Sir Henry Floyd, on 22 October 1964. The block was designed by county architect Fred Pooley and completed in 1966. The design involved a tower which stood 200 ft (61 m) high and consisted of 15 floors sitting above a complex containing the County Reference Library, Aylesbury Register Office and the County Record Office. The county council continued to use the 1929 County Offices (or "Old County Offices") building as secondary office space, with the new County Hall sometimes being called "New County Offices" to distinguish it from the 1929 building. Full council meetings were not generally held at New County Hall, but continued to be held at Old County Hall in Market Square until 2012, when they transferred to Aylesbury Vale District Council's new council chamber (called the Oculus) at The Gateway on Gatehouse Road, Aylesbury.

The new County Hall was visible from many villages and towns several miles distant. Dominating a predominantly low-rise 18th-century town, it proved to be a conversational piece of architecture. Often referred to locally as "Pooley's Folly" or "Fred's Fort" (after the architect) the building took just two years to build and was completed at a cost of £956,000 in 1966.

Analytically, if not architecturally, the new County Hall is in keeping with the town's architecture, its design history is as provincial as its more classical predecessors. While its design is a bold conception freely using works by such architects as Frank Lloyd Wright, Le Corbusier and the characteristics of De Stijl and it has similarities to Paul Rudolph's School of Art and Architecture at Yale completed in 1963. However, as early as 1904 Auguste Perret designed a block of flats in the Rue Franklin, Paris which has similar angles, bayed windows and canted recesses to County Hall in Aylesbury, and these flats too were constructed of concrete. With its Brutalist roots in the 1940s, and earlier, Aylesbury's County Hall was, like its classical predecessor, already dated by the time of its 1966 completion: by then architecture was moving on to the cleaner and straighter lines and sheets of plate glass advocated by such architects as Mies van der Rohe.

Works of art in County Hall include a portrait by Godfrey Kneller of John Egerton, 3rd Earl of Bridgewater, a portrait by Joshua Reynolds of George Nugent-Temple-Grenville, 1st Marquess of Buckingham and a copy of a painting by Peter Paul Rubens depicting a hunting party being attacked by wolves.

When Buckinghamshire County Council and the constituent districts merged to become a unitary authority in 2020, consideration was given to where the new council should be based. One option considered was the creation of a council chamber within New County Hall. It was decided instead that the Aylesbury Vale District Council building at The Gateway, with its relatively new council chamber, should be the new council's headquarters, with New County Hall continuing to be used as additional office space.
