= Aylesbury Crown Court =

County building in Aylesbury, Buckinghamshire, England

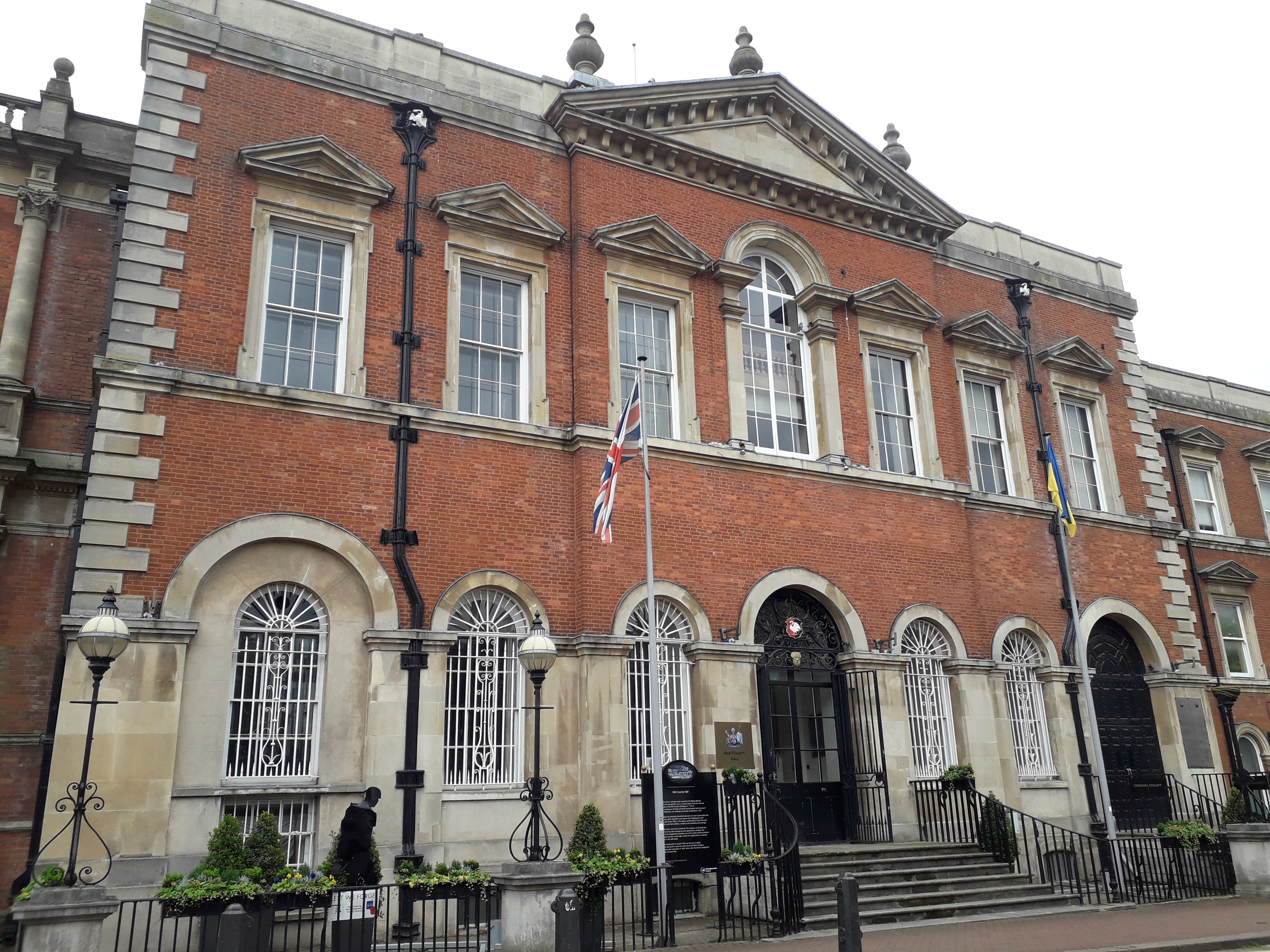

- Location within Buckinghamshire
- 51.8157°N 0.8120°W
- Location: 38 Market Square, Aylesbury

History
- Built: 1740

Site notes
- Architect: Thomas Harris
- Architectural style: Palladian style

Listed Building – Grade II*
- Designated: 7 April 1952
- Reference no.: 1117935

Aylesbury Crown Court, also known as Old County Hall, is a former judicial facility and municipal building in Market Square, Aylesbury, Buckinghamshire, completed in 1740. The building served as the meeting place of Buckinghamshire County Council from 1889 until 2012, and was used as a court until 2018. It is a Grade II* listed building.

== History ==
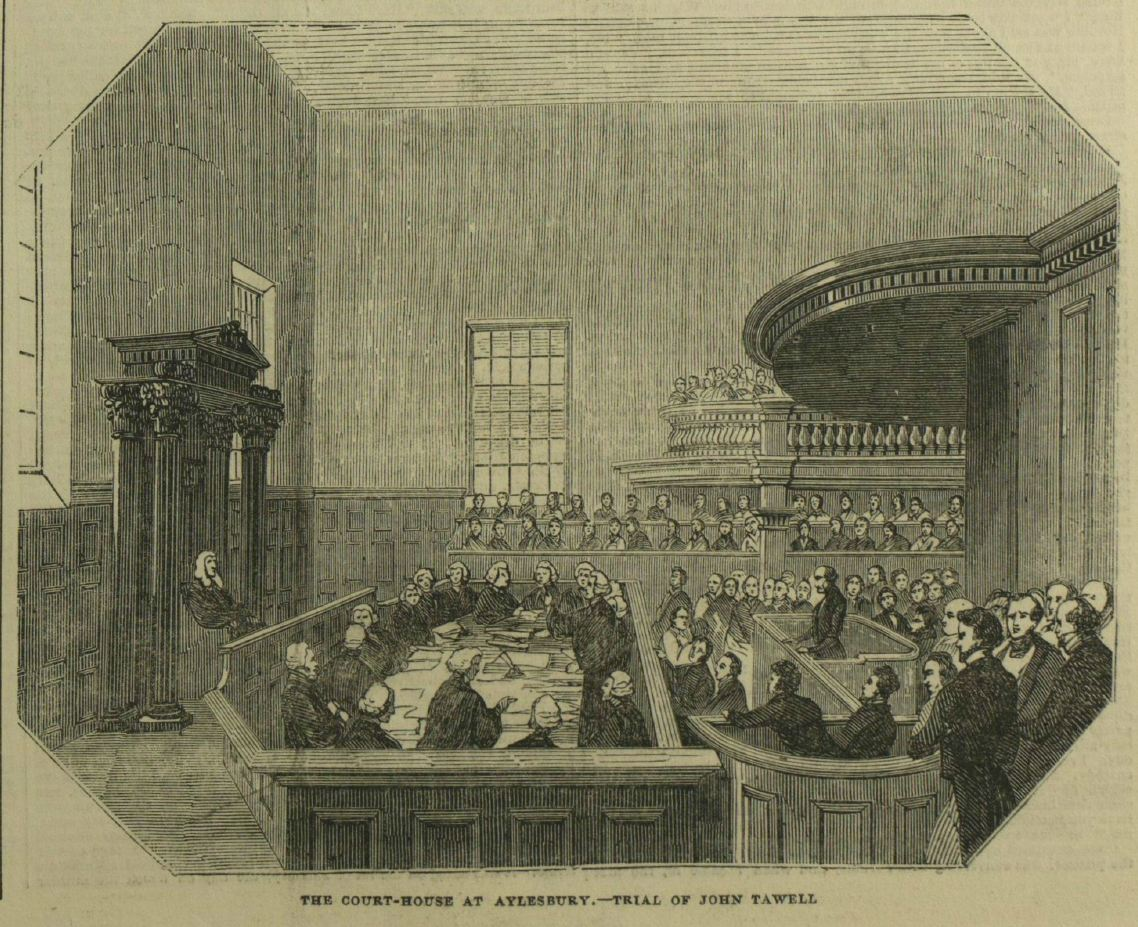
The trial of John Tawell in 1845

Construction work on the building commenced in 1722. It was designed by local architect Thomas Harris in the Palladian style following a design competition supervised by John Vanbrugh but, because of funding difficulties, it was only completed in 1740. The design involved a symmetrical main frontage with seven bays facing onto the Market Square; the central section of three bays, which slightly projected forward, featured a doorway on the ground floor with a wrought iron grill in the tympanum flanked by round-headed windows in a similar style; there was a round-headed window flanked by Doric order pilasters and pedimented windows on the first floor and a large pediment at roof level topped with three urns. Internally, the principal room was the courtroom.

The murderer, John Tawell, who was arrested after police sent a telegraph message to Paddington Station, was tried in the courtroom and then executed from the balcony (now vanished) facing the Market Square in 1845. An extension to the rear to accommodate the judge's lodgings was built to the designs of Edward Buckton Lamb and completed in 1850, while an extension to the south west, this time to accommodate the county constabulary headquarters, was built to the designs of David Brandon in a similar style to the main building and completed in 1865.

The building continued to be used as a facility for dispensing justice but, following the implementation of the Local Government Act 1888, which established county councils in every county, it also became the meeting place of Buckinghamshire County Council. It was the scene of the trial of the suffragette, Elizabeth Anne Bell, charged with carrying a loaded pistol outside the walls of HM Prison Holloway in 1913.

The courtroom was used for a court scene in the Miss Marple film Murder Most Foul which was released in September 1964. It was badly damaged in a fire on 9 February 1970 and subsequently restored. The building was then used for exterior court scenes in the television series Judge John Deed in the early 2000s.

The county council moved most of its staff to a new building called County Offices (later known as Old County Offices) on Walton Street in 1929, adjoining the back of the County Hall. This was further supplemented in 1966 by the New County Offices, also known as New County Hall, on the opposite side of Walton Street. Both Walton Street buildings were primarily office space, and council meetings continued to be held in Old County Hall until 2012, when they moved to Aylesbury Vale District Council's new council chamber (called the Oculus) at The Gateway on Gatehouse Road. An attempt to bring council meetings back to Old County Hall in 2016 was abandoned after one meeting due to concerns about the building's limited disabled access and difficulties of broadcasting meetings.

After the Crown Court moved to the magistrates' courts building further south along Walton Street in March 2018, Buckinghamshire County Council indicated an intention to develop the old building as a hotel. However, the proposal, which would have involved stripping the interior of the building, including the courthouse, met strong opposition from local people and a petition against the proposal was launched in October 2018. As of November 2023, no progress had been made on any redevelopment and, instead, the courthouse was being used for the filming of television shows such as The Gold about the Brink's-Mat robbery, which starred Hugh Bonneville and was released in February 2023.

== See also ==
- Grade II* listed buildings in Aylesbury Vale
