= Tindal Centre =

Tindall Centre
- Oxford Health NHS Foundation Trust
- Shown in Buckinghamshire

Geography
- Location: Aylesbury, Buckinghamshire, England
- Coordinates: 51.8232°N 0.8038°W

Organisation
- Care system: National Health Service
- Type: Psychiatric

History
- Founded: Late 19th century

Links
- Lists: Hospitals in England

The Tindal Centre (formerly Tindal Hospital) was a centre for the treatment of mental disorders in Aylesbury, Buckinghamshire, England. It was managed by Oxford Health NHS Foundation Trust.

== History ==
The facility had its origins in a workhouse infirmary built for the Aylesbury Poor Law Union Workhouse at Bierton Hill and completed in the late 19th century. The workhouse became Tindal Hospital during the Second World War and, more recently, the main block became home to a mental health facility known as the Tindal Centre. After services had transferred to the Whiteleaf Centre in Aylesbury, the Tindal Centre closed in 2014.

The gate lodges and piers which date from 1844 are Grade II listed.
