= Impact and legacy of Illmatic =

Legacy of the 1994 album

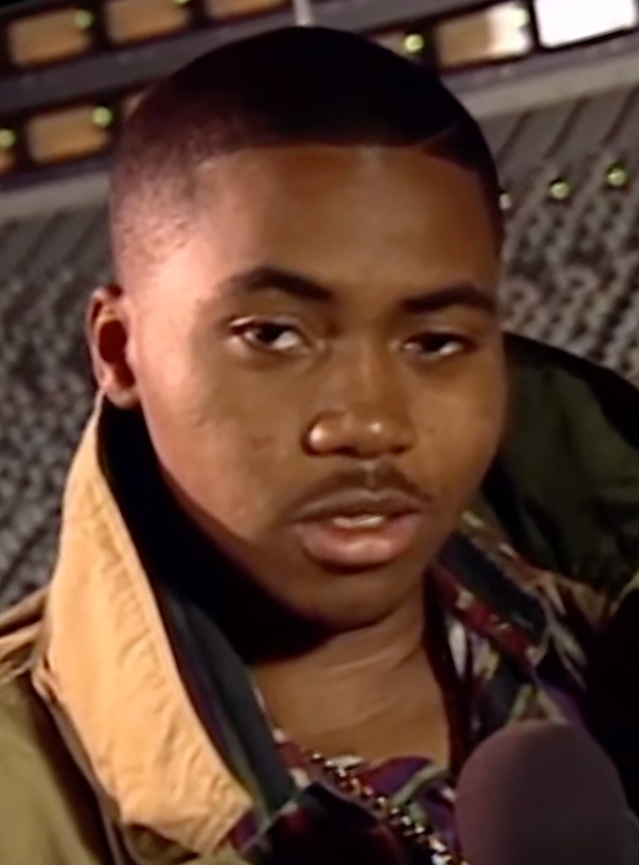
Nas in 1993, a year before the release of Illmatic.

Illmatic, the 1994 debut album by Nas, made a significant impact on the hip hop genre. The album has been credited as one of the pivotal works that returned East Coast hip hop, particularly Queensbridge's hip hop scene, to prominence in a time when public attention was focused on West Coast releases. Nas' lyricism and storytelling on Illmatic has been regarded as setting a new standard for lyrical sophistication in major hip hop releases. The production of Illmatic has also been viewed as influential in cementing the characteristic sound of New York hip hop.

Many other hip hop artists have described Illmatic as having influenced them. Additionally, the album has received substantial discussion in academic and literary fields, including in the 2009 book Born to Use Mics. When reviewing Nas' later albums, critics have frequently compared those albums to Illmatic; in particular, Nas' albums from the later 1990s were often criticized for their departures from Illmatic's style.

== East Coast hip hop ==
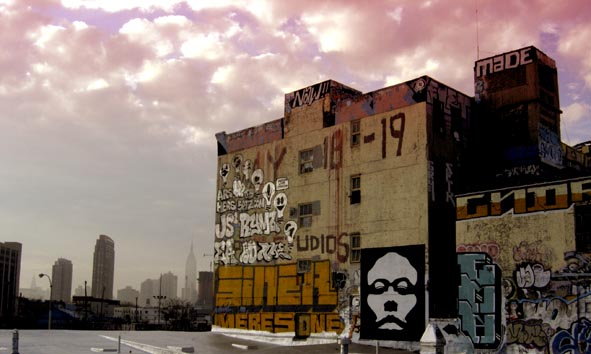
Illmatic was critical in "restoring interest" in East Coast hip hop, particularly New York's hip hop scene.

Illmatic has been noted as one of the most influential hip hop albums of all time, with pundits describing it as an archetypal East Coast hip hop album. Jeff Weiss of Pitchfork writes: "No album better reflected the sound and style of New York, 94. The alembic of soul jazz samples, SP-1200s, broken nose breaks, and raw rap distilled the Henny, no chaser ideal of boom bap." Citing Illmatic as part of a string of notable albums released in 1994, David Drake of Stylus Magazine writes "This was the critical point for the East Coast, a time when rappers from the New York area were releasing bucketloads of thrilling work". John Bush of AllMusic compares Illmatic to another DJ Premier production, The Sun Rises in the East (1994), as "one of the quintessential East Coast records". Along with the critical acclaim of the Wu-Tang Clan's debut album Enter the Wu-Tang (36 Chambers) (1993) and the success of The Notorious B.I.G.'s debut Ready to Die (1994), Illmatic was instrumental in restoring interest in the East Coast hip hop scene. "Rarely has the birthplace of hip-hop," wrote Rob Marriott of Complex, "been so unanimous in praise of a rap record and the MC who made it." As Nas later recounted: "It felt amazing to be accepted by New York City in that way ... at the time a lot of West Coast hip-hop was selling; East Coast wasn't selling as much, especially for a new artist. So back then you couldn't tell in the sales, but you could tell in the streets".

=== Production ===
Illmatic has been noted as a creative high point for East Coast hip hop, since it featured production from renowned New York-based producers Large Professor, Pete Rock and DJ Premier. The album solidified the reputation of these producers, whose contributions to Illmatic became influential in shaping the soundscape of New York's regional scene. According to music writer Rob Marriott, Illmatic helped to establish DJ Premier as "the go-to producer for the jazz-and-blues-inflected knock that became so central to East Coast sound."

Following the album's release, hip hop artists increasingly began to draw upon a broad stable of producers for their projects. At the time, the assembly of big-name producers was unprecedented, since most hip hop albums had primarily been the work of one dedicated producer and sometimes an embedded production team. Yet author Adam Mansbach reflects on the impact of Illmatic's noteworthy producers, writing: "The psychological impact on the listener of having all these elite producers – some of whom, like Q-Tip, really weren't known yet for doing outside production work at all – coming together to lace the debut of this kid from Queensbridge was tremendous." This same template would be used by other successful East Coast rappers. In an article on New York hip hop, Mosi Reeves of Creative Loafing wrote that "Nas' Illmatic ... is the first to draw together top hip hop producers in the recording industry. That formula, most successfully mined by the late Notorious B.I.G. (1997's Life After Death), Puff Daddy (1997's No Way Out) and Jay-Z (1998's Vol. 2... Hard Knock Life), is what most N.Y. prospects still use today." Jon Caramanica of The New York Times writes that after Illmatic's release, "[I]t became commonplace for rappers to search around for different producers who could enhance their sound."

Yet while hip-hop artists continue to draw upon this template for album production, the practice has earned some criticism. In an article titled, "How Nas' "Illmatic" Ruined Hip-Hop," Insanul Ahmed of Complex argues that one "unintended consequence" of Illmatic was the overall decline in the cohesion and quality of rap albums: "Next thing you knew, rap albums started having a different producer for every song. And like a film that has a different director for every scene, albums became unfocused affairs. This meant that producers weren't tied to artists anymore."

=== Queensbridge ===
We used to always hear it [Illmatic] chillin' with Nas [in Queensbridge]. What's funny about it was he was humble with it. I would listen to it and the songs were so ill, it made you wanna cry. He was just calm, like, 'How you like it?' We was hearing it piece by piece, so when it came out, it wasn't surprising to hear everybody's reaction. Everybody was going crazy. You could not walk through the 'hood without hearing Illmatic. It was on your brain.

— Hip hop artist and childhood friend Havoc, reflecting on the local impact of Illmatic in a 2004 interview

Illmatic is credited with reviving the Queensbridge rap scene. Once home to prestigious pioneers such as Marley Marl, MC Shan, Roxanne Shanté, Queensbridge had been one of the most productive hip hop scenes in the country during the 1980s. In an April 2006 article, an XXL columnist wrote of the history and impact of the Queensbridge hip hop scene, stating "Since the 1980s, New York City's Queensbridge Housing Projects has been documented perhaps better than any other geographic location. Starting with super producer Marley Marl's dominant Juice Crew in the '80s all the way through '90s mainstays like Nas, Cormega and Capone, the Bridge has produced the highest per-capita talent of any 'hood." Yet during the early 1990s, the Queensbridge rap scene was otherwise stagnant. According to Nas: "I was coming from the legacy of Marley Marl, MC Shan, Juice Crew kind of vibe. Knowing these guys out in the neighborhood. At that time, the Queensbridge scene was dead. Dropping that album right there said a lot for me to carry on the legacy of the Queensbridge pioneers."

Following Illmatic's release, Queensbridge returned to prominence after years of obscurity, with the ascendancy of the influential hardcore rap group Mobb Deep (whose affiliation with Nas garned them credibility) and later with the emergence of the trend-setting underground duo Capone-n-Noreaga. Nas appeared on Mobb Deep's critically acclaimed studio album The Infamous (1995), in addition to their next two studio albums, Hell on Earth (1996) and Murda Muzik (1999). The album is credited with launching the career of the East New York-based rapper AZ, who later joined Nas's rap group The Firm. AZ, who gained instant exposure and underground credibility due to his appearance on "Life's a Bitch", became a frequent collaborator of Nas, who appeared on his debut album Doe or Die (1995).

=== Decline of alternative hip hop ===
Illmatic was one of the first major recordings to emerge from New York's burgeoning hardcore hip hop scene, at a time when much of East Coast hip hop was still dominated by alternative hip hop acts such as A Tribe Called Quest and De La Soul (groups known for their jazz-inspired production, socially conscious lyrics, and playful sensibilities). Adam Heimlich of The New York Press comments on the appeal of alternative hip-hop in New York City's music scene, and points out that, "In 1994, there appeared likely to be more money (and definitely more cultural rewards) in working with Arrested Development or Digable Planets." Yet according to Heimlich, Illmatic provided an "explosive, explicit rejection of the cultural assimilation of most previous hip-hop," due to its rugged use of language and its uncompromising portrayal of crime. Professor Sohail Dalautzai of the University of Southern California comments on Illmatic's indebtedness to hardcore hip hop: "[B]ecause in bridging the gap and embodying the street swagger of Kool G Rap, the metaphysics of Rakim, and the revolutionary lumpen philosophies of Ice Cube, Nas ... unified the disparate threads of urban rebellion that were conflagrating from hip-hop's street corner ciphers."

Heimlich cites Nas' role in the resurgent hardcore movement, writing: "[Nas] came on the scene as hardcore's golden child. Along with Wu-Tang Clan, Nas and Mobb Deep ... all but invented 90s New York rap, back when the notion of an 'East Coast gangsta' still meant Schoolly D or Kool G. Rap. Those three ... designed the manner and style in which New York artists would address what Snoop and Dre had made rap's hottest topics: drugs and violence." Similarly, Duke University Professor, Mark Anthony Neal, writes, "Nas was at the forefront of a renaissance of East Coast hip hop" in which "a distinct East Coast style of so-called gangsta rap appeared," as heard in similarly styled recordings such as Wu-Tang Clan's "C.R.E.A.M." and Notorious B.I.G.'s "Everyday Struggle". Steve Huey of AllMusic concludes that while Illmatic contains strong elements of jazz rap, it nonetheless signaled a major regional shift towards hardcore aesthetics, marking "the beginning of a shift away from Native Tongues-inspired alternative rap."

== West Coast hip hop ==
The critical acclaim surrounding the album helped to shift attention away from the melodious, synth-driven, and funk-induced G-funk subgenre, which dominated the charts for some time after Dr. Dre's The Chronic (1992). Citing the example of Snoop Dogg's wildly popular Doggystyle (released six months prior to Nas' debut) author Matthew Gasteier writes, "The first thing immediately noticeable about the [Source magazine] review, is that, like essentially every other review about Illmatic in publications like Vibe, Spin, Rolling Stone, and The New York Times, it mentions Snoop Doggy Dogg's Doggystyle in the first paragraph." That nearly every reviewer felt the need to contextualize their response to Illmatic within the frame of West Coast G-Funk "is a reminder of just how pervasive the style was within the hip hop world and the music community as a whole."

Yet according to writer Mickey Hess, Illmatic was among those East Coast records that helped "create sparse, rough and rugged soundscapes that clearly differed from Dre's multi-layered melodies." As AllMusic's Steve Huey writes, "It helped spearhead the artistic renaissance of New York hip hop in the post-Chronic era, leading a return to street aesthetics." Contrasting these aesthetics with the themes found in G-Funk, writer and filmmaker Dream Hampton writes, "Illmatic was a dirty bomb thrown at the orchestral sonic soundtrack that was The Chronic .... This wasn't a backyard bikini barbeque where the Ohio Players and DJ Quik were mashed up; this was a three-month bid on Rikers Island, a dirty dice game, blunts of brown Brooklyn sparked in the park after dark."

Despite these regional differences, Hampton credits Illmatic with providing a long-term artistic common ground for rappers on the West Coast and East Coast rap scenes. In the 2009 essay "Born Alone, Die Alone," she recounts the album's impact on West Coast artist, Tupac Shakur. While working as a journalist for The Source in 1994, Hampton covered three court cases involving Tupac. Around this time, she received an advance-copy of Illmatic and immediately dubbed a cassette version for Tupac, who became "an instant convert" of the album. The next day, she writes, Tupac "arrived in his assigned courtroom blasting Illmatic so loudly that the bailiff yelled at him to turn it off before the judge took his seat on the bench." In her essay, Hampton implies that Nas' lyricism might have influenced Tupac's acclaimed album Me Against the World, which was recorded that same year.

West Coast artist The Game recounts the impact of Illmatic for fans like himself outside of New York. In his collaboration with Nas on "Hustlers" (2006), he retells an episode taking place during his youth, where he decided to shoplift both Illmatic and The Chronic: "1995, eleven years from the day/I'm in the record shop with choices to make Illmatic on the top shelf, The Chronic on the left, homie/Wanna cop both but only got a twenty on me/So fuck it, I stole both, spent the twenty on a dub-sack/Ripped the package of Illmatic and bumped that/For my niggas it was too complex when Nas rhymed/I was the only Compton nigga with a New York State of Mind".

== Lyricism ==
During the time of its release, Illmatic brought a renewed focus on lyricism to hip hop—hearkening back to the heyday of Kool G Rap, Big Daddy Kane, and Rakim. Music journalist Kelefa Sanneh of The New York Times wrote of Illmatic, stating that Nas "perfected a dense, rat-a-tat rhyme style that built upon the legacy of 1980s pioneers like Rakim and Big Daddy Kane." In his book To the Break of Dawn: A Freestyle on the Hip Hop Aesthetic, William Jelani Cobb writes of Nas' impact on lyricism and the comparisons to eminent rapper Rakim at the time:

Nas, the poetic sage of the Queensbridge projects, was hailed as the second coming of Rakim—as if the first had reached his expiration date. ... Nas never became "the next Rakim", nor did he really have to. Illmatic stood on its own terms. The sublime lyricism of the CD, combined with the fact that it was delivered into the crucible of the boiling East–West conflict, quickly solidified [his] reputation as the premier writer of his time.

Despite its initial low sales, the album had a profound impact on the hip hop underground circuit, and marked a major stylistic change in hip hop music by introducing a new standard of lyricism. Before the album's release, hip-hop lyricism was mostly defined by two popular forms. One was characterized by a fast-paced ragga-flow accompanied with a whimsical, often nonsensical lyrical delivery, and had been popularized by the Brooklyn-based groups Das EFX and The Fu-Schnickens. The other was characterized by a slurred "lazy drawl" that generally sacrificed lyrical complexity for clarity and rhythmic cadence, and was exemplified by West Coast hip hop emcees including Snoop Doggy Dogg and Warren G. Nas' content, verbal pace, and intricate internal rhyme patterns inspired several rappers to modify their lyrical abilities. Music critic Rob Marriott notes, "[R]appers like Mobb Deep, Tragedy Khadafi, Nature, Cormega, Noreaga, Capone, Raekwon, Ghostface, and even the Windy City wordsmith Common seemed to find new inspiration in Nas' self awareness, internal rhyme schemes, and mastery of street detail", and describes the impact of Illmatic's "poetic approach" on Jay-Z, writing: "The Brooklyn MC switched his style up from his fast-talking Jaz-O days enough to produce Reasonable Doubt, an album marked by Nas-like introspection".

Many rappers have taken note of Illmatic's influence on their lyricism. Ghostface Killah recounted, "When I used to listen to Nas back in the days, it was like, 'Oh shit! He murdered that.' That forced me to get my pen game up .... The whole Illmatic album forced you to go ahead and do shit .... It was inspiration." Detroit rapper Elzhi states, "[A]round the time Nas did Illmatic, it made me wanna step my game up .... He's one of the reasons I did go off into storytelling because his pictures were so vivid. When he displayed his rhyme schemes and his word play and his songs, it made me wanna create visual pictures as well." Casey Veggies recounts the impact Nas' lyricism had on his own work as an underground rapper in the 2000s: "I [got into] Illmatic when I was 14, 15. I didn't get onto to it till late, but when I did, that's probably the only thing I listened to for six months to a year .... After I got heavy on Illmatic, I put out Sleeping In Class (2010). That's when I really tried to sharpen my skills and get better."

=== Hip hop poetry ===
In addition to his rapping, Nas achieved significance for his poetic use of language. Professor Adilifu Nama of California State University Northridge writes, "With Illmatic, hip-hop witnessed the birth of an urban griot telling hard-boiled tales of ghetto alienation and triumph like a spoken-word of a Chester Himes novel". Author and music writer Todd Boyd wrote of Nas' urban realism, stating that his "poetic lyrics are some of the most poignant words ever to describe the postindustrial urban experience. His spoken-word like delivery and his vivid use of metaphor placed him at the top of the game in terms of overall skills as an MC and as a cultural commentator." An OhWord.com columnist similarly described Nas as a "genius introvert who rose out of the rubble of Reaganomics to bless the mic with a forward brand of introspective, redemptive street poetry". Princeton University professor Imani Perry describes Illmatic as ars poetica, a definitive statement for the art of hip-hop poetry."

According to author and poet Kevin Coval, Nas "raise[d] the bar for MCs" by advancing his lyricism "from punch lines and hot lines to whole thought pictures manifest in rhyme form." Together with Paul Beatty's seminal collection of poems, Joker Joker Deuce (1994) Coval cites the release of Illmatic as a "generational moment" that marked the development of hip hop poetry. Just as hip-hop poetics were being written and published for the first time on paper, Nas provided a sonic production that definitively captured "the poetic response" to hip hop music. "It is from this point on," he writes, "that style, technique and craft merge with collage/pastiche, braggadocio, stark portrait-painting from the margins, frenetic, fun and funny wordplay, and the rupture of linear storytelling schemes. These become tropes in a burgeoning school of American letters that's moving toward an aesthetics of hip-hop poetics."

Many of the poetic tropes found in Illmatic have become terms and phrases within hip-hop lexicon. "'The World Is Yours,' Nas' reference to the blimp in Scarface," writes Rob Marriott, "has remained a trope hip-hop has taken to heart .... Even the word "Illmatic" itself ... became synonymous with anything surprisingly excellent, street-born and/or out of left field." In 2013, music writer Jeff Weiss commented on the extensive vernacular usage of Illmatic, writing: "The phrases and images are so deeply rooted in rap consciousness to have become cliché. Over the last 19 years, a million secret handshakes and scratched hooks have been executed to lines from Illmatic."

== Impact on hip hop artists ==
Respected mainstream and underground rappers have acknowledged Illmatic's influence. These wide range of artists include the battle rappers, SunN.Y. and Reef The Lost Cauze, conscious rappers Talib Kweli and Lupe Fiasco, the producers Just Blaze and 9th Wonder, as well as the platinum-selling artists Wiz Khalifa, Alicia Keys and The Game, who makes references to the album on his debut, The Documentary. In 2006, Illmatic was featured in a list of acclaimed hip hop albums, compiled by Clipse. Malice, a member of the hip hop duo, claimed: "Illmatic captured the whole New York state of mind for me. It embraced everything I knew New York to be. The album had 10 songs, all of them flawless. Me and my homies got great memories of rolling around listening to that, huslin', smokin', chillin'. That embodied everything that was right with hip-hop. That CD never came out my deck." Speaking in 2012, British producer, DJ Semtex described Illmatic as "an exemplary album of perfection that forced the evolution of lyricism and production values within hip hop. Eighteen years later it remains omnipotent."

In 2006, Marc Mac of the electronic music duo 4hero produced a cover version of "The World Is Yours" as part of his jazz and hip-hop fusion project, The Visioneers. Lyrics from Illmatic have been sampled by other rappers, notably Big L's "Ebonics" (which samples "It Ain't Hard to Tell"), Milkbone's "Keep It Real" ("Life's a Bitch"), Real Live's "Real Live Shit" ("It Ain't Hard to Tell"), Damu the Fudgemunk's "Prosper" ft. Raw Poetic ("N.Y. State of Mind"), Blu & Exile's "In Remembrance" ("The World Is Yours" and "One Love"), Mac Miller's "Nikes On My Feet" ("The World Is Yours") and Jay-Z's "Rap Game/Crack Game" ("Represent") and "Dead Presidents II" ("The World Is Yours").

He's the best rapper in the world. He was the first from the generation after Rakim to embody the same spirit. He said shit that was bone-chilling. He had more heart than anyone else out there at the time ... I knew he was good before Illmatic, but the album superseded whatever you expected from any rapper at that time.

— Busta Rhymes

=== Legacy and tributes ===
Illmatic has become a benchmark for upcoming rappers whose albums are widely anticipated by critics. Hip hop pundits have viewed debut albums as crucial in generating publicity and shaping the legacy of an artist's career. Given the historic anticipation and acclaim surrounding Nas' debut, Illmatic has become a byword for this sort of phenomenon. As one columnist for the Complex Magazine writes, "Think about the question that pops into your head whenever a new rapper drops his first album: 'Is it the next Illmatic?'" In 2012, the release of Kendrick Lamar's album, Good Kid, M.A.A.D City, drew comparisons to Illmatic from critics and journalists. In an interview with 2 Dope Boyz, Lamar commented on these comparisons, stating:

Illmatic? For people to even put my album in the light of that, is an accomplishment. It's crazy to even be mentioned with it but it's scary at the same time .... That era – I wanna say the age range now would be 30, 30 to 40 – they can recognize this was the album. Illmatic's the album for the '90s era when I was growing up ... it's just a weird feeling to be in that same type of light, 'cus it takes a whole lot of responsibility to keep that up in the long run and longevity, and that's something I don't have yet ... so Illmatic will always be #1.

Illmatic has been cited as a musical template for other hip hop artists. Common's critically acclaimed album Be (2005) has been said to have been molded after Illmatic. In 2010, underground hip hop artist Fashawn released the mixtape Ode to Illmatic to "pay homage, 'cause Illmatic was one of them kinda albums that really impacted my life". Detroit rapper Elzhi released a remake of Illmatic titled Elmatic (2011). Taking note of a trend of tributes to Illmatic in 2011, Richard Watson of The Guardian wrote, "To quote Nasir Jones himself ... 'It Ain't Hard To Tell' why today's rappers are paying tribute to his debut album. Illmatic has become a totem, a work that both looked back into hip-hop history and pointed towards its future."

== Scholarly response ==
Illmatic has received notable attention from scholars and authors outside the music industry. Since its release, the album has become the subject of scholarship within academic and literary circles. In 2009, as part of the 33⅓ book series, author Matthew Gasteier published a deconstruction of Illmatic, that focuses on the dualities that inform its narratives. In 2012, playwright Shaun Neblett created a tribute play titled Homage 3: Illmatic, which tells the story of an aspiring artist and explores the themes found in Nas' debut. "[A]s its title suggests," writes one reviewer, "the play is completely based on and acts as a tribute to Nas' Illmatic album. The rappers' bars come alive on stage through Homage 3, which deliberately shows how intellectually well-versed Nas truly is, and much bigger than that, how much Hip-Hop has to offer, culturally, outside of the radio, clubs and the street."

Illmatic is the focus of a significant work of hip-hop scholarship, Born to Use Mics: Reading Nas's Illmatic (2009), edited by Michael Eric Dyson and Sohail Daulatzai. With contributions from figures such as Greg Tate, Adam Mansbach, Eddie Glaude, Dream Hampton, Marc Lamont Hill, and Suheir Hammad, Born to Use Mics is the first academic project to assemble a group of scholars, poets, filmmakers, journalists, novelists, and musicians to reflect on a specific hip hop album. In the introduction, Daulatzai explains the singular focus on Illmatic, writing:

[S]ome might ask, why Illmatic? Why not Boogie Down Productions' Criminal Minded, Public Enemy's It Takes a Nation to Hold Us Back, or Ice Cube's AmeriKKKa's Most Wanted? No doubt these were great albums, coming at a moment when hip hop was cutting its teeth on social commentary and refining its ear on dusty breaks, hard snares, and sonic mayhem. But there is something about Illmatic that transcends the categories that have ever existed about hip-hop. Something complex about its simplicity, something elusive that we felt we wanted to explore. Straight up though, Illmatic is just a dope album, embodying everything that is hip-hop while mastering what matters most: beats and rhymes.

=== Hip hop debates ===
Illmatic has helped to shape the attitudes and perceptions of hip hop fans, who cherish it as a music template that defines the genre's conventions. As music critic Jeff Weiss writes, "Illmatic is the gold standard that boom-bap connoisseurs refer to in the same way that Baby Boomers talk about Highway 61 Revisited. The evidence they point to when they want to say: this is how good it can be." New York Times columnist Jon Caramanica credits the album with inadvertently spawning hip hop's counterculture. "Illmatic" he writes, "mobilized a national network of dissidents craving something true to the streets but eager to distance themselves from what was beginning to be perceived as a scourge – gangster rap." According to Caramanica, Nas' debut was received by these fans as a "rebuke" towards trends that were beginning to shape mainstream rap: "the pop crossover, the exuberant production values, [and] the splintering of rap into blithe and concerned wings."

For this reason, Caramanica considers Illmatic to be "unusually significant to the intellectual development of the [hip-hop] genre" yet he remains critical of the divisiveness spawned by its "zealots." In his essay, "'Night Time is More Trife Than Ever': The Many Misuses of Nas," he writes: "Illmatic is responsible for countless pointless 'rap versus hip-hop debates,' a shocking amount of hip-hop self-righteousness, the emergence of the backpack movement as something more than a regional curio, and the persistence of the idea that lyricism is the only standard great rap music should be held to." Commenting on these polarized debates, Jeff Weiss suggests that Illmatic is "best heard by ignoring the dogma, culture wars, Nas clones, and would-be saviors that have accreted since April 1994. Who cares whether it's the greatest rap album of all-time or not? It's an example of how great rap can be, but not necessarily the way it should be."

== Impact on Nas' career ==
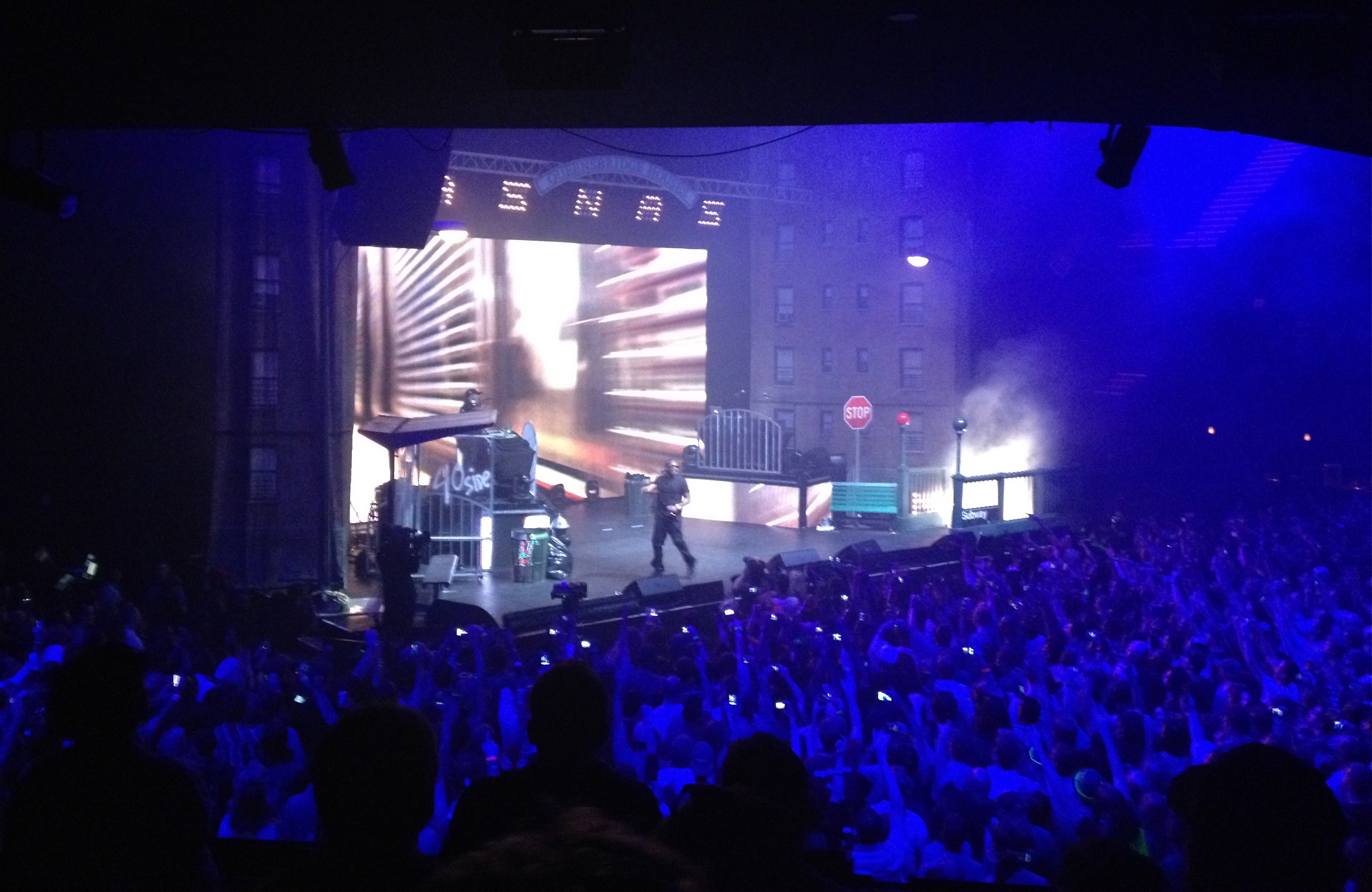
Nas at South by Southwest in 2012, where he performed the album in its entirety

While Illmatic's success helped Nas' career immeasurably, hip hop aficionados have cited the album as his inextricable "gift and curse". Due to its critical fame, Nas' subsequent studio albums have been weighed against Illmatic, despite all of them outselling his debut. Against this standard, they are often critically deemed as mediocre follow-ups. After manager Steve Stoute convinced Nas to aim his efforts in a more commercial direction for his follow-up album It Was Written (1996), he enlisted the production team Trackmasters, who were known for their mainstream work at the time. It was criticized for its embrace of gangsta/mafioso themes and materialistic subject matter, but proved to be a commercial success, selling over three million copies. Critics gave it mixed reviews, and general consensus was that it failed to live up to the classic status of Illmatic. Many fans of Illmatic labeled his subsequent efforts as 'selling out', due to his crossover sensibilities (e.g. his participation with the hip-hop group the Firm) and radio-friendly hits aimed at the pop charts, such as "If I Ruled the World (Imagine That)" (1996) and "Hate Me Now" (1999).

When he released his third and fourth studio albums, I Am... and Nastradamus (1999), which underwent editing due to bootlegging of the recording sessions, many fans and critics feared that his career was deteriorating, as both albums received further criticism for their commercially oriented sound. Reflecting this widespread perception in the hip hop community and adding to his ongoing feud with Nas at the time, Jay-Z mocked him in the song "Takeover" (2001) for having a "one hot album [Illmatic] every ten year average". A journalist writing for The Source commented on the demanding legacy of Nas' debut: "Blame excellence, blame perfection and aggression. Blame one of hip-hop's most beautiful moments for the prison that traps Nasir Jones today – blame Illmatic." Nas made something of a comeback with his fifth album Stillmatic (2001) and the acclaimed follow-up God's Son (2002), as well as The Lost Tapes (2002), a compilation of previously unreleased tracks from the I Am... and Nastradamus sessions. Afterwards, his subsequent albums have all been well received by critics. Nevertheless, most fans have regarded Illmatic as his definitive album.

In 2011, Nas performed the album in its entirety at Rock the Bells music festival. The show featured the album's personnel, including Pete Rock, DJ Premier, and AZ, and a stage design depicting the urban landscape of Queensbridge, with graffiti-lined streets, a subway entrance, and models of Queensbridge's housing project. In 2012, he performed the album in its entirety at South by Southwest music festival, with the same personnel and stage design. Illmatic will be reissued as a deluxe CD bundled with a 48-page hardcover book featuring photos, reproduced artwork, lyrics, and liner notes courtesy of The Source founder Jon Schecter.

In 2014, Nas announced Illmatic XX, the 20th Anniversary Edition of the original album Illmatic, released April 15, 4 days prior to the 20th Anniversary of the original's release date (April 19). Illmatic XX includes a remastered version of Illmatic, an extra disc of demos, remixes, and unreleased records from that era of Nas' career. He announced his plans for a tour where he will perform the whole album front to back on each stop.
