= One Love (Nas song) =

1994 single by Nas

Single by Nas featuring Q-Tip

from the album Illmatic
- Released: October 25, 1994
- Recorded: 1993
- Genre: East Coast hip-hop; alternative hip-hop; jazz rap
- Length: 5:26
- Label: Columbia
- Songwriters: Nasir Jones; Jonathan Davis; James Heath
- Producer: Q-Tip

Nas singles chronology
"The World Is Yours" (1994)	"One Love" (1994)	"Fast Life" (1995)

Q-Tip singles chronology
"Buddy" (1989)	"One Love" (1994)	"Got 'til It's Gone" (1997)

Music video
- "One Love" on YouTube

"One Love" is a song by American rapper Nas, released October 25, 1994 on Columbia Records. It was issued as the fifth and final radio single in promotion of his debut studio album Illmatic (1994). The song was produced by Q-Tip of A Tribe Called Quest, who also contributed vocals for the chorus line. According to Nas, the title of the song originates from Jamaican singer-songwriter and musician Bob Marley's song of the same name.

"One Love" is composed as a series of letters written by Nas to his incarcerated friends, describing events that have occurred prior to and after the receivers' imprisonment. "One Love" contains samples of the Heath Brothers' "Smilin' Billy Suite Part II" (1975) and Parliament's "Come In Out of the Rain" (1972), along with an interpolation of Whodini's One Love (1986). In the song's first verse, Nas references fellow Queensbridge emcee Cormega, whose rapping career had been put on hold due to his incarceration during the early 1990s. In 2008, VH1 named "One Love" the forty-eighth greatest hip-hop song.

== Background and recording ==
While producing A Tribe Called Quest's Midnight Marauders album, Q-Tip had his production setup in the house basement of Phife Dawg's grandmother. After Q-Tip met with Nas in the basement, Nas heard the main sample and decided to use it for "One Love". Q-Tip created the beat there, using the pause tape method of production. At the recording session, after Nas's verses were recorded, Q-Tip "finessed" the song's drum programming.

== Composition ==
"One Love" samples the mbira (thumb piano), double bass and piano from the Heath Brothers' "Smilin' Billy Suite Part II" (1975) and contains a drum break from Parliament's "Come in out the Rain" (1970), which add to the song's mystical and hypnotic soundscape.

Lyrically, "One Love" is composed of a series of letters written by Nas to incarcerated friends, recounting mutual acquaintances and events that have occurred since the receiver's imprisonment, including unfaithful girlfriends, emotionally tortured mothers and underdog loyalty. According to one writer, the phrase "one love" represents street loyalty in the song. Nas later explained that the title of the song originated from Jamaican singer-songwriter Bob Marley's song of the same name, which, according to writer Mickey Hess, "echoed the ubiquitous street salutation 'one' (similar to 'peace') used around Nas's neighborhood." In a 1994 article on the distinct styles of East Coast and West Coast hip-hop, music journalist Touré referred to "One Love" as an example of the thematic differences between the two regional scenes, stating:

The more ambitious themes of New Yorkers' rhymes over those of their L.A. counterparts can be traced to the original intention of hip-hop in each city: Many L.A. rappers embraced the drug culture, while those in New York tended to use hip-hop as an avenue of escape from it ... In 'One Love', Nas echoes that perspective, rapping about his own temporary getaway: 'So I be ghost from my projects/ I take my pen and pad for the weekend/ A two-day stay/ You may say/ I needed time alone/ To relax my dome/ No phone/ Left the nine at home.'

— Touré

Among those referenced in the song was fellow Queensbridge-based rapper Cormega ("And night time is more trife than ever/What up with Cormega, did you see him, are y'all together?"). Cormega's rapping career had been put on hold due to his incarceration during the early 1990s, before his release in 1995. After delivering "shout-outs to locked down comrades", Nas chastizes a youth who seems destined for prison in the final verse, "Shorty's laugh was cold blooded as he spoke so foul/Only twelve tryin to tell me that he liked my style ... Words of wisdom from Nas, try to rise up above/Keep a eye out for Jake, shorty-wop, one love". Music writer Susan Weinstein wrote that "the literary technique Nas most strongly excels in is the one that would seem to be most pedestrian: rhyme", and cited "One Love" as the first display of Nas's "formal inventiveness".

== Retrospect ==
From artist:

Q-Tip used to come and hang out with me in my projects from time to time. I remember him coming out there and hanging out, and I remember him letting me hang out at his session when he was working on Midnight Marauders. I thought he was just the most incredible, so to have him producing my album, for him to even do the chorus for me is a blessing. The song just came from life, it's a song about letters to prison inmates, friends of mine, shout-outs to childhood friends and their uncles and people who were like family to me. I was, again, too young to be going through all of that. That's what I think about when I hear that album. I was too young to be going through all of that.

— Nas

== Track listing ==
=== A-side ===
1. "One Love" (Album Version) (5:23)
2. "One Love" (Radio Edit) (5:23)
3. "One Love" (Album Instrumental) (5:23)
4. "One Love" (Acappella) (5:21)

=== B-side ===
1. "One Love" (LG Main Mix) (5:33)
  - Produced by The LG Experience
2. "One Love" (LG Radio Edit) (4:29)
3. "One Love" (LG Instrumental) (2:06)
4. "One Love" (One L Main Mix) (5:43)
  - Produced by Godfather Don and Victor Padilla
5. "One Love" (One L Radio Edit) (4:48)
6. "One Love" (One L Instrumental) (1:55)

== Charts ==
Chart (1994)	Peak position
US Dance Singles Sales (Billboard)	6
US Hot Rap Songs (Billboard)	24
