= N.Y. State of Mind =

1994 song by Nas

- Side A of the Nas x Wu-Tang Clan: N.Y. State of Mind / Protect Ya Neck - Picture Disc Vinyl 7" Single

Single by Nas

from the album Illmatic
- Released: April 19, 1994
- Recorded: 1992
- Genre: East Coast hip-hop; boom bap; gangsta rap
- Length: 4:54
- Label: Columbia
- Songwriters: Nasir Jones; Chris Martin
- Producer: DJ Premier

Audio video
- "N.Y. State of Mind" on YouTube

"N.Y. State of Mind" is a single by American rapper Nas from his debut studio album Illmatic (1994). The song's production was handled by DJ Premier who sampled two jazz songs: "Mind Rain" by Joe Chambers and "Flight Time" by Donald Byrd. Additionally, Premier scratched up vocal samples from "Mahogany" by Eric B. & Rakim and Nas' vocals from his appearance on "Live at the Barbeque" by Main Source co-featuring Joe Fatal and Akinyele. Nas raps two verses on the song in which he talks about his rapping talent and describes the dangerous environment that is the city of New York over a drum break sample of "N.T." by Kool & the Gang. Nas has attributed the song "Streets of New York" by Kool G Rap as one of the song's primary influences (Kool G Rap would later sample this song, and give Nas a guest spot on his album 4,5,6). Sequels to "N.Y. State of Mind" can be found on Nas' 1999 album I Am... and on Nas' and DJ Premier's 2025 album Light-Years. On January 28, 2019, it was certified gold by the Recording Industry Association of America (RIAA).

== Recording ==
It was just amazing watching [Nas] work because I was already a fan of him when he did "Back to the Grill," "Halftime," "It Ain't Hard to Tell," and "Live at the Barbeque." So when I heard him on those records I was like, "Yo, I got to do something that's on the same level."

— DJ Premier on "N.Y. State of Mind"

"N.Y. State of Mind" was produced by DJ Premier, who stated that the song was created in the studio with Nas writing his verses on the spot. Premier recalled that Nas recorded the first verse in a single take. Before stepping to the mic, Nas would quietly mumble his lines to himself, a process Premier described as him formatting the verse. The song begins with Nas saying, "I don't know how to start this shit," which Premier explained was a genuine moment captured as Nas prepared to deliver his verse. After recording, Nas asked, "How was that? Did that sound all right?" to which Premier and others in the studio reacted enthusiastically.

== Music ==
The beat for "N.Y. State of Mind" was created from scratch, incorporating samples from multiple sources. Its built on a drum break that comes from Kool & the Gang's "N.T." along with a piano loop sampled from Joe Chambers' "Mind Rain", a track from his 1978 album Double Exposure. The "monotone chirps" heard in the song are taken from Donald Byrd's "Flight Time", the opening track of his 1972 album Black Byrd. Billboard describes the song's production as representative of the classic New York underground boom bap sound of the mid-1990s, while Revolt's Jon Powell described it as "haunting and minimalist". Roisin O'Connor of The Independent refers to the piano sample as a "menacing chop", while Billboard calls it "sinister."

== Legacy ==
"N.Y. State of Mind" ranks #74 on About.com's Top 100 Rap Songs.

Rolling Stone magazine ranked the song at #31 on its list of "100 Greatest Hip-Hop Songs of All Time."

Rock the Bells ranked the beat of the song at #5 on their list of the greatest hip-hop beats of all time.

Marc L. Hill of PopMatters describes "N.Y. State of Mind" as a standout track on Illmatic claiming that it "provides as clear a depiction of ghetto life as a Gordon Parks photograph or a Langston Hughes poem." The song is also one of a few rap songs to be featured in the Norton Anthology of African American Literature. It is featured on Nas' 2007 greatest hits album as the only non-single song in the album, and on the 1999 compilation Best of D&D Studios, Vol. 1. Steve 'Flash' Juon of RapReviews.com states:

"[Illmatic] was to be an album steeped in the rich traditions of hip-hop history, mixed with the most advanced verbal styles and fat beats that could be put on wax. And if it couldn't be set off any more right already, the DJ Premier produced "N.Y. State of Mind" was designed to knock you right off your feet. Primo's knack for finding the illest piano loops and matching them to pounding beats was perfected in this track, and paired with a Rakim sample on the chorus that provided the mental link for an analogy most rap heads had already made by now: Nas was the NEW Rakim on the block.

The song is included on the soundtrack of video games True Crime: New York City and Saints Row 2, and was featured and discussed in Season 4 Episode 8 of the Netflix show Ozark, which borrowed its title "Cousin of Death" from a lyric in the song. The episode features one of its main characters discussing the merits of creating the song versus the pain necessary to create it.

== Certifications ==
Region	Certification	Certified units/sales
Denmark (IFPI Danmark)	Gold	45,000^{‡}
New Zealand (RMNZ)	Platinum	30,000^{‡}
United Kingdom (BPI)	Gold	400,000^{‡}
United States (RIAA)	Gold	500,000^{‡}
^{‡} Sales+streaming figures based on certification alone.
