= The World Is Yours (Nas song) =

1994 single by Nas

Single by Nas

from the album Illmatic
- B-side: "The World Is Yours (Tip Mix)"
- Released: May 31, 1994
- Recorded: 1992
- Studio: Battery Studios (New York City)
- Genre: East Coast hip-hop; jazz rap; hardcore hip-hop
- Length: 4:51
- Label: Columbia
- Songwriters: Nasir Jones; Peter Phillips
- Producer: Pete Rock

Nas singles chronology
"Life's a Bitch" (1994)	"The World Is Yours" (1994)	"One Love" (1994)

Music videos
- "The World Is Yours" on YouTube
- "The World Is Yours (Tip Mix)" on YouTube

"The World Is Yours" is a song by American rapper Nas, for his debut album, Illmatic (1994). The song was released in May 1994, by Columbia Records and is written by Nas and Pete Rock. It is considered by music critics as one of the greatest hip-hop songs ever recorded; About.com ranked it seventh. The single reached number 13 on the US Billboard Hot Rap Singles chart and is produced by Pete Rock. It samples T La Rock and Jazzy Jay’s “It’s Yours”, as well as Ahmad Jamal's "I Love Music", from The Awakening, and Rock also sings the chorus.

The song pays homage to the film Scarface. The song also references drug dealer/crime boss Howard "Pappy" Mason, and it mentions the unknown serial killer of the Texarkana Moonlight Murders.

A remix of the song was produced by Q-Tip featuring similar but new lyrics; both it and the original were released by Columbia Records as singles, and promoted with music videos.

Sprite put the title of this song on its cans and bottles in summer 2015 as part of their "Obey Your Verse" summer campaign putting rap lyrics on their cans. On January 28, 2019, the single was certified Gold by the RIAA.

== Soundtrack appearances ==
The song was featured in the video games Tony Hawk's Underground, NBA 2K13, and NBA 2K26. It can also be heard in a scene in the 2002 film Antwone Fisher, and appears on the soundtrack for the 2008 film The Wackness. The song is also played in the 2015 film Dope.

== Other cultural references ==
"The World Is Yours" was mentioned by Nas in his later songs "Got Ur Self a Gun" and "Firm Biz".

The Tip mix of "The World is Yours" is sampled in many rap songs, including tracks by Logic, Joey Bada$$, and the song "Dead Presidents" by Jay-Z, which in itself has been reinterpreted with the Nas sample by rappers such as Lil Wayne, J. Cole, Drake, Kendrick Lamar, and Mac Miller

== Single track listing ==
=== A-Side ===
1. "The World Is Yours" (4:51)
2. "The World Is Yours" (Instrumental) (4:51)

=== B-Side ===
1. "The World Is Yours" (Tip Mix) (4:29)
2. "The World Is Yours" (Tip Mix Instrumental) (4:30)

== Charts ==
Chart (1994)	Peak position
Canada Retail Singles (The Record)	13
US Bubbling Under Hot 100 (Billboard)	14
US Dance Singles Sales (Billboard)	6
US Hot R&B/Hip-Hop Songs (Billboard)	67
US Hot Rap Songs (Billboard)	27

== Certifications ==
Region	Certification	Certified units/sales
New Zealand (RMNZ)	Gold	15,000^{‡}
United Kingdom (BPI)	Silver	200,000^{‡}
United States (RIAA)	Gold	500,000^{‡}
^{‡} Sales+streaming figures based on certification alone.
