= Tears We Cannot Stop =

2017 non-fiction book by Michael Eric Dyson

Tears We Cannot Stop: A Sermon to White America
- First edition
- Author: Michael Eric Dyson
- Language: English
- Published: January 17, 2017
- Publisher: St. Martin's Press
- Publication place: United States
- Media type: Print, e-book
- Pages: 240 pp
- ISBN: 978-1-250-13599-5

Tears We Cannot Stop: A Sermon to White America is a 2017 non-fiction book by Michael Eric Dyson.

== Overview ==
A look into the state of race relations in the United States, delivered as "a hard-hitting sermon on the racial divide, directed specifically to a white congregation."

The book grapples with the social construct of "whiteness" and challenges the readers to "reject the willful denial of history and to live fully in the complicated present with all of the discomfort it brings." Dyson's 'sermon' addresses "five dysfunctional ways that those regarded as white respond when confronted with the reality that whiteness is simultaneously artificial and powerful," as well as "dysfunctional ways that black people sometimes respond to white racism."

Dyson argues that if we are to make real racial progress we must face difficult truths, including being honest about how black grievance has been ignored, dismissed or discounted.
