= Life's a Bitch (song) =

1994 single by Nas

Single by Nas featuring AZ

from the album Illmatic
- Released: April 19, 1994
- Recorded: 1993
- Genre: East Coast hip hop; jazz rap
- Length: 3:29
- Label: Columbia
- Songwriters: Nasir Jones; Anthony Cruz; Olu Jones; Ronnie Wilson; Oliver Scott
- Producer: L.E.S.

Nas singles chronology
"It Ain't Hard to Tell" (1994)	"Life's a Bitch" (1994)	"The World Is Yours" (1994)

"Life's a Bitch" is a song by American rapper Nas, released by Columbia Records on April 19, 1994. It is the third single from his debut studio album, Illmatic (1994). Issued as a 12" single, it features guest vocals from AZ and a cornet performance from Nas' father, Olu Dara. The song has been sampled in other hip hop songs, including "YSIV" by Logic (2018), "Keep It Real" by Miilkbone (1995), and "Carry On" by Statik Selektah featuring Joey Bada$$ (2014).

== Songwriting and origins ==
The song's producer, L.E.S., sampled the songs "Yearning for Your Love" by the Gap Band and "Black Frost" by Grover Washington, Jr. for the song's instrumental.

Nas mentioned about his father's cornet work:

"I asked my dad to play on the end of it — I told him to play whatever comes to mind when he thinks of me as a kid. I think he's really proud to see me coming up and really taking my life serious and doing what I want."

== References in music ==
The song's title and concept were later referenced in Nas' collaboration track "Affirmative Action" off his 1996 album It Was Written, where Nas raps "Life's a bitch but god-forbid the bitch divorce me".

== References in film ==
In the 2009 film Fish Tank by Andrea Arnold, the song is played in one of the final scenes. It is also played during the closing credits.

== Track listing ==
=== A-side ===
1. "Life's a Bitch" (radio edit) (3:37)
2. "Life's a Bitch" (main mix) (3:29)
3. "Life's a Bitch" (instrumental) (3:29)

=== B-side ===
1. "Life's a Bitch" (Arsenal radio edit) (3:31)
2. "Life's a Bitch" (Arsenal mix) (3:31)
3. "Life's a Bitch" (Arsenal instrumental) (3:35)
