= What Truth Sounds Like =

- First edition
- Author: Michael Eric Dyson
- Language: English
- Published: 2018
- Publisher: St. Martin's Press
- Publication place: United States
- Media type: Print, e-book
- ISBN: 9781250295927

What Truth Sounds Like: Robert F. Kennedy, James Baldwin, and Our Unfinished Conversation About Race in America is a 2018 non-fiction book by Michael Eric Dyson.

== Overview ==
The book is an analysis of American race relations with the focal point a 1963 meeting between Attorney General Robert F. Kennedy and a group of notable African-Americans including James Baldwin, Harry Belafonte, Lena Horne and Lorraine Hansberry and Freedom Rider Jerome Smith.
