= Halftime (song) =

1992 single by Nas

Single by Nasty Nas

from the album Zebrahead (Soundtrack From The Original Motion Picture) and Illmatic
- Released: October 13, 1992
- Recorded: 1992
- Genre: Hardcore hip-hop
- Length: 4:20
- Label: Columbia; Ruffhouse
- Songwriter: Nasir Jones
- Producer: Large Professor

Nasty Nas singles chronology
"Halftime" (1992)	"It Ain't Hard to Tell" (1994)

"Halftime" is a song by American rapper Nasty Nas, who would change his name to Nas after the release of the song. The song was released as his debut single, the sole single from the Zebrahead soundtrack album and the lead single from his debut album Illmatic, on October 13, 1992. "Halftime" was produced by Large Professor, Remixed by Joe "The Butcher" Nicolo and features samples of drums and vocals from "School Boy Crush" by Average White Band, horns from "Soul Traveling" by Gary Byrd, and the bassline from "Dead End" from the Japanese cast recording of the musical Hair. The song was the first song created for Illmatic, and was released circa one and a half years earlier than the album.

== Background ==
"I went over [to Large Professor's house], and he made the "Halftime" beat in front of me, and he was gonna give it to me at the time. I didn't know what to do with it. I didn't know why I didn't know what to do with it, because I loved the shit out the beat. Then I heard it on "Halftime," and I was like, Goddamn, I was a stupid ass for not touching this beat!"

— Busta Rhymes interviewed by XXL

Producer Large Professor had already produced the instrumental of the song when he came into the studio session. After hearing the instrumental, rapper Busta Rhymes wanted to use it and tried writing to it but ultimately struggled with writer's block. Then in Nas' first own studio session he "had his weed ready, he had the crew coming through, his books [of rhymes], the fresh gear, sittin' back with a freshly rolled, and another one being rolled, like, ‘Yo, play the beat... Nah yo, play the other beat.'" "Halftime" was the first song produced for Illmatic.

== Content ==
"Halftime" features an up-tempo beat led by percussion and trumpets over which Nas rhymes. Memorable lines include "You couldn't catch me in the streets without a ton of reefer/That's like Malcolm X, catchin' the Jungle Fever" and "I'm as ill as a convict who kills for phone time." Nas also uses this song to give a "shout-outs" to Willie "Ill Will" Graham, Nas' childhood neighbor and best friend, who was shot dead in 1992, and the Queensbridge Crew, a reference to the Queensbridge housing projects in Queens, NY, USA. He also reveals he's a fan of Marcus Garvey, the Jackson 5 and Mr. Magic.

== Significance ==
The inclusion of "Halftime" to the Zebrahead soundtrack by MC Serch led to Nas's breakthrough as a rapper, as a record deal with Columbia Records and the release of his debut album, Illmatic (1994), followed. According to Vibe magazine, the song "created a niche that only Illmatic could fill".

== Sampling ==
Lyrics from "Halftime" are sampled in these songs:

- "Exercise" by Akinyele
- "Rugged Ruff" by Bahamadia
- "We Got It Hemmed" by Cella Dwellas
- "Down for the Kaz" by Kazi
- "I Will Always Love H.E.R." by Peanut Butter Wolf
- "Strike Back" by Army of the Pharaohs
- "Vengeance" by East Coast Avengers
- "Am I Dope Or What" by Vakill
- "Furam Obleku" by Target of Tram 11
- "Crazy Like a Foxxx (D.I.T.C. Version)" by Bumpy Knuckles

== Track listing ==
A-side

1. "Halftime" (Radio Edit) (4:19)
2. "Halftime" (LP Version) (4:19)
3. "Halftime" (LP Version Instrumental) (4:19)

B-side

1. "Halftime (Butcher Remix)" DJ Bubie (4:41)
2. "Halftime (Butcher Instrumental)" (4:42)
