= It Ain't Hard to Tell =

1994 single by Nas

Single by Nas

from the album Illmatic
- Released: January 18, 1994
- Recorded: 1992
- Genre: East Coast hip-hop; hardcore hip-hop; jazz rap
- Length: 3:22
- Label: Columbia
- Songwriters: Nasir Jones; William Mitchell; Steven Porcaro; John Bettis
- Producer: Large Professor

Nas singles chronology
"Halftime" (1992)	"It Ain't Hard to Tell" (1994)	"Life's a Bitch" (1994)

Music video
- "It Ain't Hard to Tell" on YouTube

"It Ain't Hard to Tell" is the second single and last track from American rapper Nas' debut album, Illmatic (1994). Although the track was technically the second single on the album, it was the first single to be released after the album was pressed in 1994. The first single, "Halftime," was released two years prior to Illmatic's debut.

"It Ain't Hard to Tell" was produced by Large Professor, and samples Michael Jackson's 1983 hit single "Human Nature", "N.T." by Kool & the Gang, "Long Red" by Mountain and "Slow Dance" by Stanley Clarke. The single reached number 91 on the US Billboard Hot 100 chart.

In 1991, Nas recorded a demo tape for Columbia Records, featuring the original version of "It Ain't Hard to Tell" named "Nas Will Prevail". This version is roughly 90 seconds longer, includes longer different verses, and has a more subdued, jazzier beat close to the album version. Pitchfork's included the song at number 28 on their Top 200 Tracks of the 90s.

== Music video ==
The music video was directed by Ralph McDaniels. Nas created a homage to Wild Style (1983), the first hip hop motion picture, while shooting the music video, as he shot portions of the clip on the same stage used for the final scene of Wild Style.

== Single track listing ==
=== US 12" Vinyl ===
==== A-Side ====
1. "It Ain't Hard to Tell" (Main Mix)

==== B-Side ====
1. "It Ain't Hard to Tell" (Instrumental)
2. "It Ain't Hard to Tell" (A Cappella)

=== US 12" Vinyl (Remix) ===
==== A-Side ====
1. "It Ain't Hard to Tell (Remix)"

==== B-Side ====
1. "It Ain't Hard to Tell (Remix Instrumental)"

=== UK 12" Vinyl ===
==== A-Side ====
1. "It Ain't Hard to Tell" (Main Mix)
2. "It Ain't Hard to Tell" (Main Mix Instrumental)

==== B-Side ====
1. "It Ain't Hard to Tell" (Remix)
2. "It Ain't Hard to Tell" (Acapella)

=== UK 12" Vinyl (The Remixes) ===
==== A-Side ====
1. "It Ain't Hard to Tell (The Stink Mix)"
2. "It Ain't Hard to Tell (The Stink Instrumental Mix)"

==== B-Side ====
1. "It Ain't Hard to Tell (The Laidback Remix)"
2. "It Ain't Hard to Tell (The Laidback Instrumental Remix)"

=== Netherlands 12" Vinyl ===
==== A-Side ====
1. "It Ain't Hard to Tell (Album Mix)" (3:20)
2. "It Ain't Hard to Tell (Album Mix Instrumental)" (3:20)

==== B-Side ====
1. "It Ain't Hard to Tell (Remix)" (2:50)
2. "It Ain't Hard to Tell (Remix Instrumental)" (2:50)
3. "It Ain't Hard to Tell (A cappella)" (2:24)

=== Austria Maxi-CD (COL 660470 2) ===
1. "It Ain't Hard to Tell (Main Mix)" (3:25)
2. "It Ain't Hard to Tell (Remix)" (2:53)
3. "It Ain't Hard to Tell (Acapella)" (2:27)
4. "It Ain't Hard to Tell (Main Mix Instrumental)" (3:23)

=== Austria CD (COL 660302 2) ===
1. "It Ain't Hard to Tell (Album Mix)"
2. "It Ain't Hard to Tell (Album Mix Instrumental)"
3. "It Ain't Hard to Tell (Remix)"
4. "It Ain't Hard to Tell (Remix Instrumental)"
5. "It Ain't Hard to Tell (A cappella)"

== Charts ==
=== Weekly charts ===
Chart (1994)	Peak position
UK Dance (Music Week)	12
UK Singles (Official Charts)	64
US Billboard Hot 100	91
US Dance Singles Sales (Billboard)	3
US Hot R&B/Hip-Hop Songs (Billboard)	57
US Hot Rap Songs (Billboard)	13

=== Year-end charts ===
Chart (1994)	Position
US Maxi-Singles Sales (Billboard)	28
