= Born to Use Mics =

Book editored by Michael Eiry Dyson and Sohail Daulatza

Born to Use Mics: Reading Nas's Illmatic
- First edition
- Editors: Michael Eric Dyson, Sohail Daulatzai
- Language: English
- Subject: Hip hop
- Genre: Non-fiction
- Published: 2009
- Publisher: Basic Civitas Books
- Publication place: United States
- Pages: 308
- ISBN: 978-0-465-00211-5
- LC Class: ML

Born to Use Mics: Reading Nas's Illmatic, edited by Michael Eric Dyson and Sohail Daulatzai is a collection of scholarly essays and historical documents presenting Illmatic from an academic perspective. The book features contributions from scholars and intellectuals including Adilifu Nama, Guthrie P. Ramsey Jr., James Peterson, Marc Lamont Hill, Mark Anthony Neal, Imani Perry, Kyra Gaunt, and Eddie S. Glaude. It also includes a preface written by Common. In the introduction, Sohail Daulatzai explains the structure of the book, writing:

...Born to Use Mics encompasses the different styles and forms of hip-hop publishing, from the scholarly to the journalistic, the historical to the first-person account, using freestyles and wild styles to wax philosophic on the meaning of Illmatic. But the final mix you hold is more than the sum of its parts, as we've brought together an eclectic group of writers, scholars, poets, filmmakers, journalists, novelists, musicians, and combinations thereof who have all grown up with hip hop and have been deeply connected to it from jump. In essence, Born to Use Mics is a literary remix, a cipher in book form as all of these contributors offer up unique and fresh perspectives, as they mediate on the significance of Illmatic.

Born to Use Mics... attempts to establish itself as a guide for exploring Illmatic and its lessons on race, gender, and hip-hop culture. It includes an interpretive chapter for each song on the album, and features a section devoted to interviews, reviews, and personal reminiscences. The book has been noted as a milestone in hip-hop scholarship, since it is the first to assemble a group of scholars and intellectuals to analyze a singular album within the genre.

In a review of Born to Use Mics, Alessandro Porco comments on the significance of this intellectual project: "Given the high volume of books published every year on hip-hop music and culture, it's surprising that Born to Use Mics is the first book of its kind, one dedicated to a single epoch-defining record."
