= Michael Eric Dyson =

American academic and ordained minister (born 1958)

The Reverend Michael Eric Dyson ll
- Born: October 23, 1958 (age 67); Detroit, Michigan, U.S.
- Spouses: Theresa Taylor (m. 1977; div. 1979); Brenda Joyce (m. 1982; div. 1992); Marcia Louise (m. 1992)

Ecclesiastical career
- Ordained: c. 1977

Academic background
- Education: Carson–Newman College; Princeton University
- Thesis: Uses of Heroes: Celebration and Criticism in the Interpretation of Malcolm X and Martin Luther King, Jr. (1993)
- Influences: Manning Marable

Academic work
- Discipline: Sociology
- Institutions: Vanderbilt University
- Website: michaelericdyson.com

Michael Eric Dyson (born October 23, 1958) is an American academic, author, Baptist minister, and radio host. He is a professor in the College of Arts and Science and in the Divinity School at Vanderbilt University. Described by Michael A. Fletcher as "a Princeton Ph.D. and a child of the streets who takes pains never to separate the two", Dyson has authored or edited more than twenty books dealing with subjects such as race, religion and politics, as well as biographies on Malcolm X, Martin Luther King Jr., Marvin Gaye, Barack Obama, Bill Cosby, Tupac Shakur and Jay-Z.

== Early life and education ==
Dyson was born on October 23, 1958, in Detroit, Michigan, the son of Addie Mae Leonard, who was from Alabama. He was adopted by his stepfather, Everett Dyson, who married Leonard in 1960. He attended Cranbrook School in Bloomfield Hills, Michigan, on an academic scholarship but left and completed his education at Northwestern High School. He became an ordained Baptist minister at nineteen years of age. Having worked in factories in Detroit to support his family, he entered Knoxville College as a freshman at the age of twenty-one. Dyson received his bachelor's degree, magna cum laude, from Carson–Newman College in 1985. He received a Ph.D. in religion from Princeton University in 1993 after completing a doctoral dissertation titled Uses of Heroes: Celebration and Criticism in the Interpretation of Malcolm X and Martin Luther King, Jr.

== Career ==
=== Professor ===
Dyson has taught at Chicago Theological Seminary, Brown University, the University of North Carolina at Chapel Hill, Columbia University, DePaul University, and the University of Pennsylvania. From 2007 to 2020, he was a professor of sociology at Georgetown University. In 2021, Dyson moved to Vanderbilt University where he holds the Centennial Chair and serves as University Distinguished Professor of African American and Diaspora Studies in the College of Arts and Science and University Distinguished Professor of Ethics and Society in the Divinity School. Between 2016 and 2018, he was a visiting professor at Middlebury College in Middlebury, Vermont.

=== Author ===
His 1994 book Making Malcolm: The Myth and Meaning of Malcolm X became a New York Times notable book of the year. In his 2006 book Come Hell or High Water: Hurricane Katrina and the Color of Disaster, Dyson analyzes the political and social events in the wake of the catastrophe against the backdrop of an overall "failure in race and class relations". In 2010, Dyson edited Born to Use Mics: Reading Nas's Illmatic, with contributions based on the album's tracks by, among others, Kevin Coval, Kyra D. Gaunt ("Professor G"), dream hampton, Marc Lamont Hill, Adam Mansbach, and Mark Anthony Neal. Dyson's own essay in this anthology, "'One Love', Two Brothers, Three Verses", argues that the current US penal system disfavors young black males more than any other segment of the population. His last three books appeared repeatedly on the New York Times Bestseller list.

=== Commentator ===
Dyson hosted a radio show, which aired on Radio One, from January 2006 to February 2007. He is also a commentator on National Public Radio, MSNBC and CNN, and is a regular guest on Real Time with Bill Maher. Beginning in July 2015, Dyson became a political analyst for MSNBC. In May 2018, he participated in the Munk debate on political correctness, arguing alongside Michelle Goldberg against Stephen Fry and Jordan Peterson. In August 2018, Dyson spoke at the funeral of Aretha Franklin.

The Michael Eric Dyson Show radio program debuted on April 6, 2009, and was broadcast from Morgan State University. The show's first guest was Oprah Winfrey, to whom Dyson dedicated his 2009 book Can You Hear Me Now? The Inspiration, Wisdom, and Insight of Michael Eric Dyson. The show appears to have been discontinued, with its last episode being in December 2011.

Dyson served on the board of directors of the Common Ground Foundation, a project dedicated to empowering urban youth in the United States.

== Beliefs ==
Dyson's general philosophy is that American black people are continuing to suffer from generations of ongoing oppression. On Fox News with Tucker Carlson, Dyson suggested that white Americans looking for ways to counter white privilege could make individual efforts to contribute time and money to support local black communities.

== Bibliography ==
Title	Year	ISBN	Publisher
Reflecting Black: African-American Cultural Criticism	1993	ISBN 9780816621439	University of Minnesota Press
Making Malcolm: The Myth and Meaning of Malcolm X	1995	ISBN 9780195102857	Oxford University Press
Race Rules: Navigating the Color Line	1996	ISBN 9780201911862	Addison Wesley
Between God and Gangsta Rap: Bearing Witness to Black Culture	1997	ISBN 9780195115697	Oxford University Press
I May Not Get There with You: The True Martin Luther King, Jr.	2000	ISBN 9780684867762	Free Press
Holler if You Hear Me: Searching for Tupac Shakur	2002	ISBN 9780465017560	Basic Civitas Books
Open Mike: Reflections on Philosophy	2002	ISBN 9780465017652	Basic Civitas Books
Why I Love Black Women	2002	ISBN 9780465017638	Perseus Book Group
The Michael Eric Dyson Reader	2004	ISBN 9780465017713	Basic Civitas Books
Mercy, Mercy Me: The Art, Loves and Demons of Marvin Gaye	2005	ISBN 9780465017706	Basic Civitas Books
Is Bill Cosby Right? Or Has the Black Middle Class Lost Its Mind?	2005	ISBN 9780465017195	Basic Civitas Books
Pride: The Seven Deadly Sins	2006	ISBN 9780195160925	Oxford University Press
Come Hell or High Water: Hurricane Katrina and the Color of Disaster	2006	ISBN 9780465017614	Perseus Book Group
Debating Race	2007	ISBN 9780465002061	Basic Civitas Books
Know What I Mean? Reflections on Hip Hop	2007	ISBN 9780465017164	Basic Civitas Books
April 4, 1968: Martin Luther King's Death and How it Changed America	2008	ISBN 9780465012862	Basic Civitas Books
Can You Hear Me Now? The Inspiration, Wisdom, and Insight of Michael Eric Dyson	2009	ISBN 9780465018833	Basic Civitas Books
The Black Presidency: Barack Obama and the Politics of Race in America	2016	ISBN 9780544387669	Houghton Mifflin Harcourt
Tears We Cannot Stop: A Sermon to White America	2017	ISBN 9781250135995	St. Martin's Press
What Truth Sounds Like	2017	ISBN 9781250135995	St. Martin's Press
JAY-Z: Made in America	2019	ISBN 9781250230966	St. Martin's Press
Long Time Coming: Reckoning with Race in America	2020	ISBN 9781250276759	St. Martin's Press
Entertaining Race: Performing Blackness in America	2021	ISBN 9781250135971	St. Martin's Press
Represent: The Unfinished Fight for the Vote	2024	ISBN 9780759557062	Little, Brown and Company

Editor

- Born to Use Mics: Reading Nas's Illmatic (Basic Civitas Books, 2010), ISBN 9780465002115

== Awards and nominations ==
Year	Association	Category	Work	Result	Ref.
2007	American Book Award		Come Hell or High Water: Hurricane Katrina and the Color of Disaster	Won	
2004	NAACP Image Award	Outstanding Literary Work – Nonfiction	Why I Love Black Women	Won	
2006	NAACP Image Award	Outstanding Literary Work – Nonfiction	Is Bill Cosby Right? Or Has the Black Middle Class Lost Its Mind?	Won	
2007	NAACP Image Award	Outstanding Literary Work – Nonfiction	Come Hell or High Water: Hurricane Katrina and the Color of Disaster	Nominated	
2008	NAACP Image Award	Outstanding Literary Work – Nonfiction	Know What I Mean?: Reflections on Hip-Hop	Nominated	
2021	NAACP Image Award	Outstanding Literary Work – Nonfiction	Long Time Coming: Reckoning with Race in America	Nominated	
2018	Southern Book Prize	Non-Fiction	Tears We Cannot Stop	Won	
