= Heath Brothers =

American jazz group

- Origin: Philadelphia, Pennsylvania, U.S.
- Genre: Jazz
- Years active: 1975–2010
- Labels: Strata-East; Columbia; Island; Concord Jazz
- Past members: Jimmy Heath; Percy Heath; Albert Heath; Stanley Cowell; Tony Purrone; James Mtume; Akira Tana

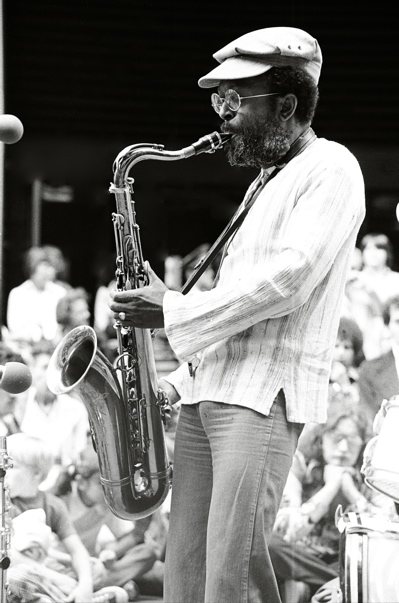
Jimmy Heath, 1977

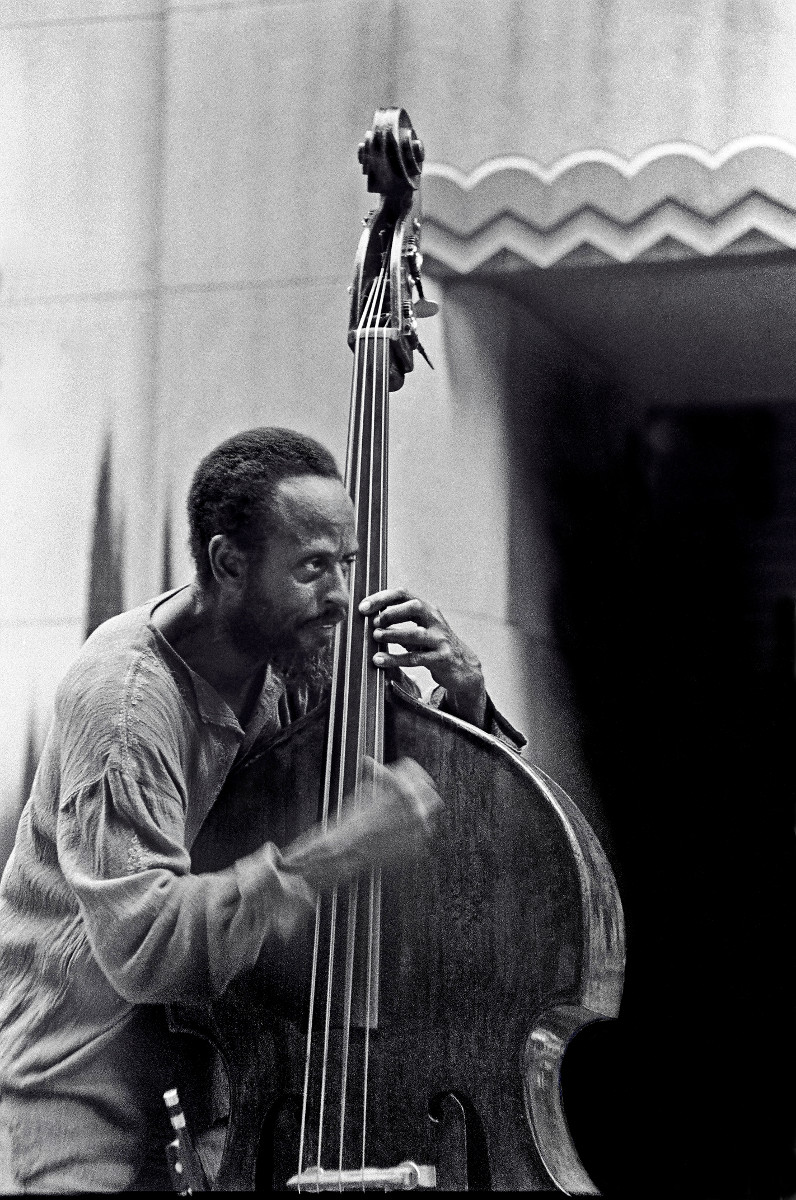
Percy Heath, 1977

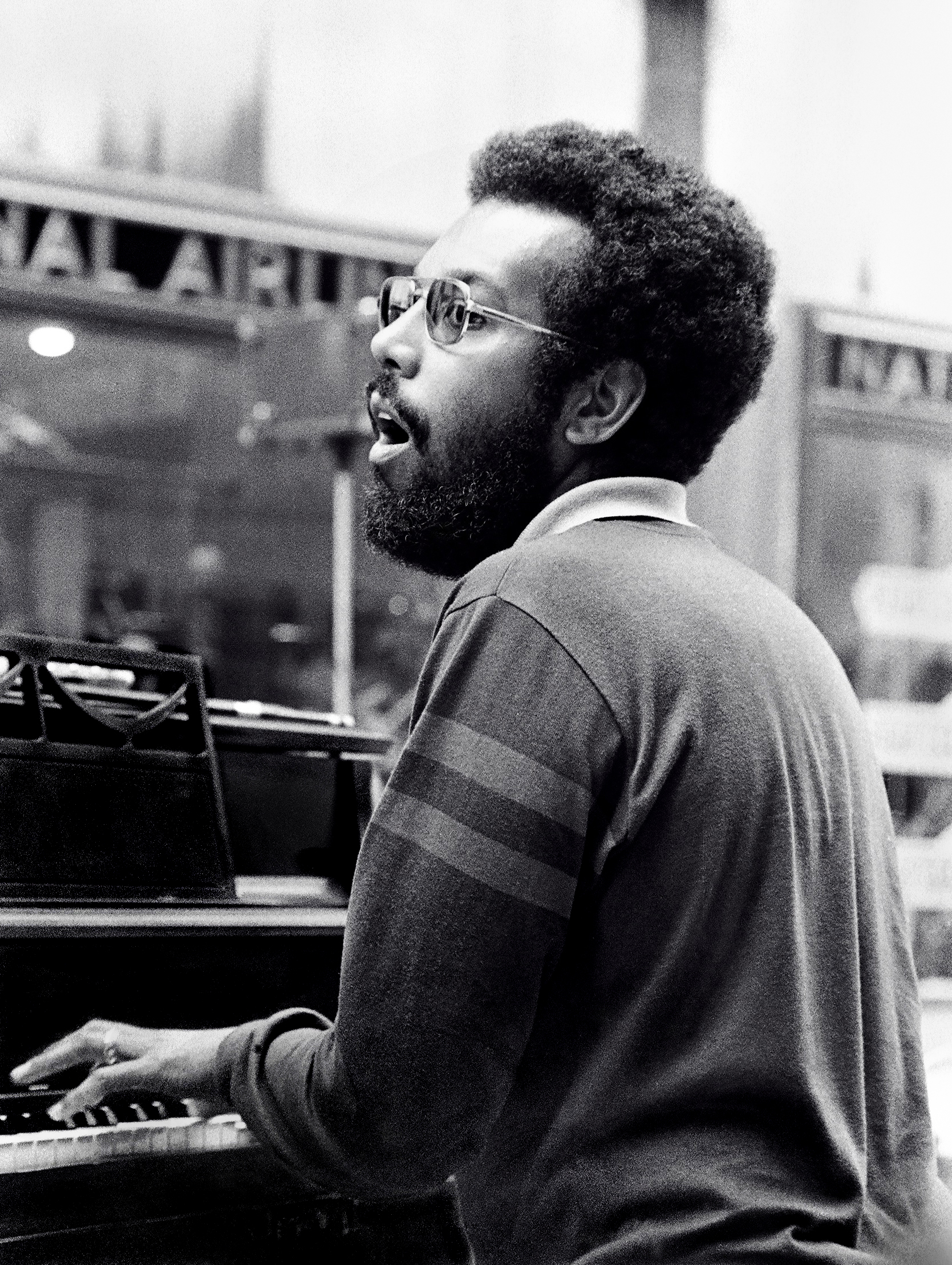
Stanley Cowell, 1977

The Heath Brothers was an American jazz group, formed in 1975 in Philadelphia, by the brothers Jimmy (tenor saxophone), Percy (bass), and Albert "Tootie" Heath (drums); and pianist Stanley Cowell. Tony Purrone (guitar) and Mtume (percussion) joined the group later. Tootie left in 1978, and was replaced by Akira Tana for a short period, before returning in 1982. They also added other sidemen for some of their recording dates.

The group issued four singles between 1978 and 1981, "Mellowdrama", "For the Public", "Use it (Don't Abuse it)" and "Dreamin'". "Dreamin'", a track from the 1980 LP, "Expressions of Life", had the most airplay in the UK despite not reaching the UK chart.

The group with just two of the brothers, Jimmy and Tootie, and additional sidemen as needed, continued to perform and record after Percy died in 2005. The DVD, Brotherly Jazz: The Heath Brothers, recorded in 2004, shortly before Percy's death, was one of the last times the three brothers played together, and chronicled the brothers' personal lives, as well as socio-political issues many jazz musicians dealt with in the later 20th century, including jail, drugs, discrimination and segregation. The 2009 CD Endurance was the first without Percy, and features seven original numbers by Jimmy, including "From a Lonely Bass", composed in memory of his late brother.

Percy Heath died on April 28, 2005. Jimmy Heath died on January 19, 2020. Tootie died on April 3, 2024.

== Discography ==
- Marchin' On (Strata-East, 1976)
- Passin' Thru... (Columbia, 1978)
- In Motion (Columbia, 1979)
- Live at the Public Theatre (Columbia, 1980) – live
- Expressions of Life (Columbia, 1980)
- Brotherly Love (Antilles, 1981)
- Brothers and Others (Antilles, 1984) – rec. 1983
- Dave's Haze (Concord, 1997)
- As We Were Saying (Concord, 1997)
- Jazz Family (Concord, 1998)
- Pat Metheny & The Heath Brothers: The Move to the Groove Session (West Wind, 2000)
- Endurance (Jazz Legacy Productions, 2009)
- Paris '76 (Sam, 2023) – live rec. 1976

== Videography ==
- Brotherly Jazz (2006) (DanSun Productions)
