= Greatest Hits (Nas album) =

Greatest hits album by Nas
- Released: November 6, 2007
- Recorded: 1992–2007
- Genre: Hip-hop
- Length: 58:53; 70:09 (international edition)
- Label: Columbia; Sony BMG
- Producer: Chris Webber; Chucky Thompson; D. Moet; DJ Premier; Large Professor; L.E.S.; Megahertz Music Group; Q-Tip; Pretty Boy; Rashad Smith; Salaam Remi; Trackmasters

Nas chronology
Hip Hop Is Dead (2006)	Greatest Hits (2007)	Untitled (2008)

Singles from Greatest Hits
- 1. "Less Than an Hour" Released: September 25, 2007; 2. "Surviving the Times" Released: November 6, 2007

Professional ratings
Review scores
Source	Rating
AllHipHop	(favorable)
AllMusic	3.5/5 stars
NME	3/5 stars
Pitchfork	6.4/10
Slant Magazine	3.5/5 stars
Drowned in Sound	7/10

Greatest Hits is a compilation album by rapper Nas, released through Columbia Records on November 6, 2007. It features twelve singles from Nas' Columbia releases, from Illmatic to Street's Disciple, along with two new tracks. Nas' 2006 studio album Hip Hop Is Dead was overlooked, as it was released by Def Jam rather than Columbia. Nastradamus and The Lost Tapes were also left out. Nas' collaboration with Cee-Lo for the Rush Hour 3 soundtrack was also included on the album. Greatest Hits debuted at number 124 on the Billboard 200, with approximately 6,800 copies sold, and number 20 on the Billboard Top R&B/Hip-Hop Albums chart. As of August 2008, the compilation has sold over 20,000 copies in the United States.

The cover features lyrics from his hit single "If I Ruled the World (Imagine That)", which appears on the compilation.

== Track listing ==
Greatest Hits track listing
No.	Title	Writer(s)	Producer(s)	Length
1.	"Surviving the Times" (previously unreleased)	Nasir Jones; Chris Webber; Charlie Smalls	Chris Webber	4:43
2.	"Less Than an Hour" (featuring Cee-Lo; from the Rush Hour 3 soundtrack, 2007)	Jones; Thomas Callaway; Salaam Remi Gibbs; Lalo Schifrin	Salaam Remi	3:16
3.	"It Ain't Hard to Tell" (from Illmatic, 1994)	Jones; William Paul Mitchell	Large Professor	3:22
4.	"Life's a Bitch" (featuring AZ; from Illmatic, 1994)	Jones; Anthony Cruz; Olu Dara Jones; Robert Wilson; Oliver Scott	L.E.S.; Nas (co.)	3:30
5.	"N.Y. State of Mind" (from Illmatic, 1994)	Jones; Christopher Martin	DJ Premier	4:53
6.	"One Love" (featuring Q-Tip; from Illmatic, 1994)	Jones; Jonathan Davis; Jimmy Heath	Q-Tip	5:24
7.	"If I Ruled the World (Imagine That)" (Featuring Lauryn Hill; from It Was Written, 1996)	Jones; Jean-Claude Olivier; Samuel Barnes	Trackmasters	4:43
8.	"Street Dreams (Remix)" (featuring R. Kelly, from the "Street Dreams" single, 1996)	Jones; Olivier; Barnes; Annie Lennox; David A. Stewart	Trackmasters	4:27
9.	"Hate Me Now" (featuring Puff Daddy, from I Am..., 1999)	Jones; Gavin Marchand	D-Moet; Pretty Boy; Trackmasters	4:45
10.	"One Mic" (from Stillmatic, 2001)	Jones; Chucky Thompson	Nas; Chucky Thompson for the Hitmen	4:29
11.	"Got Ur Self A..." (from Stillmatic, 2001)	Jones; Jake Black; Dorsey Wesley	Megahertz Music Group	3:49
12.	"Made You Look" (from God's Son, 2002)	Jones; Gibbs; Jeremiah Lordan	Salaam Remi	3:23
13.	"I Can" (from God's Son, 2002)	Jones; Gibbs; Roy Hammond	Salaam Remi	4:14
14.	"Bridging the Gap" (featuring Olu Dara; from Street's Disciple, 2004)	Jones; Gibbs; Olu Dara Jones	Salaam Remi	3:55
Total length:				58:53

International edition bonus tracks
No.	Title	Writer(s)	Producer(s)	Length
15.	"Halftime" (from Illmatic, 1994)	Jones; Mitchell; Gary Byrd	Large Professor	4:20
16.	"Nas Is Like" (from I Am..., 1999)	Jones; Martin	DJ Premier	3:57
17.	"Thief's Theme" (from Street's Disciple, 2004)	Jones; Gibbs; Doug Ingle	Salaam Remi	2:59
Total length:				70:09

== Samples used ==
- "Surviving the Times"
  - "What Would I Do If I Could Feel" by Nipsey Russell
  - "Use Me" by Bill Withers
- "It Ain't Hard to Tell"
  - "Human Nature" by Michael Jackson
  - "N.T." by Kool & the Gang
  - "Long Red (Live)" by Mountain
  - "Why Can't People Be Colors Too?" by The Whatnauts
  - "Slow Dance" by Stanley Clarke
  - "What Do You Want from Me Woman" by The Blue Jays
  - "Sorcerer of Isis" by Power of Zeus
- "Life's a Bitch"
  - "Yearning for Your Love" by The Gap Band
  - "Black Frost" by Grover Washington Jr.
- "N.Y. State of Mind"
  - "Mind Rain" by Joe Chambers
  - "Flight Time" by Donald Byrd
  - "Mahogany" by Eric B. & Rakim
- "One Love"
  - "Smilin' Billy Suite Pt. II" by the Heath Brothers
  - "Mixed Up Cup" by Clyde McPhatter
  - "Come in out of the Rain" by Parliament
- "If I Ruled the World"
  - "Friends" by Whodini
  - "If I Ruled the World" by Kurtis Blow (interpolation)
  - "Walk Right Up to the Sun" by The Delfonics (interpolation)
- "Street Dreams (Remix)"
  - "Sweet Dreams (Are Made of This)" by Eurythmics (interpolation)
  - "Choosey Lover" by Isley Brothers
- "Hate Me Now"
  - "Carmina Burana" by Carl Orff
- "One Mic"
  - "In the Air Tonight" by Phil Collins
  - "I'm Gonna Love You Just a Little More Baby" by Barry White
- "Got Ur Self A..."
  - "Woke Up This Morning" by Alabama 3
- "Made You Look"
  - "Apache" by Incredible Bongo Band
- "I Can"
  - "Für Elise" as composed by Ludwig van Beethoven (interpolation)
  - "Impeach the President" by The Honeydrippers
- "Bridging the Gap"
  - "Mannish Boy" by Muddy Waters (interpolation)
- "Halftime"
  - "Dead End" from the Hair OST (Japanese Release)
  - "Soul Travelin'" by Gary Byrd
  - "School Boy Crush" by Average White Band
  - "Hawaiian Sophie" by Jaz-O
- "Nas Is Like"
  - "Why" by Don Robertson
  - "Canata of New Life" by John Rydgren
  - "It Ain't Hard to Tell" by Nas
- "Thief's Theme"
  - "In-A-Gadda-Da-Vida" by Iron Butterfly

== Charts ==
Chart (2007)	Peak position
US Billboard 200	124
US Top R&B/Hip-Hop Albums (Billboard)	20
US Top Rap Albums (Billboard)	11
UK Hip Hop and R&B Albums Chart (Official Charts)	17

== Certifications ==
Region	Certification	Certified units/sales
United Kingdom (BPI)	Gold	100,000^{‡}
^{‡} Sales+streaming figures based on certification alone.
