= N.I.G.G.E.R. (The Slave and the Master) =

Song by Nas

from the album Untitled
- Released: July 11, 2008
- Genre: Hip hop
- Length: 4:33
- Label: Def Jam, Columbia, The Jones Experience
- Songwriters: N. Jones; Aldrin Davis; A. Bell; P. Hurtt
- Producer: DJ Toomp

"N.I.G.G.E.R. (The Slave and the Master)" (censored as "N.I.*.*.E.R. (The Slave and the Master)") is a song by rapper Nas from his untitled 2008 studio album. The song contains samples from "We're Just Trying to Make It" by The Persuaders.

The song was nominated for Best Rap Solo Performance at the Grammys on December 3, 2008.

Nas intended to convey a specific message through this song. Initially, he planned to name the entire album Nigger, but he ultimately decided against it due to the racial turmoil of the time, its reflection on the world around him, and the need for a reevaluation of societal norms. Nas ultimately changed the album title out of concern that record stores might refuse to stock it. Despite the title change, the message conveyed through the songs remained unchanged, as Nas wanted to ensure that his message would reach as wide an audience as possible. And while the album name has changed, the cover art "says nigger real loud."
