= Fat Lever =

American basketball player (born 1960)

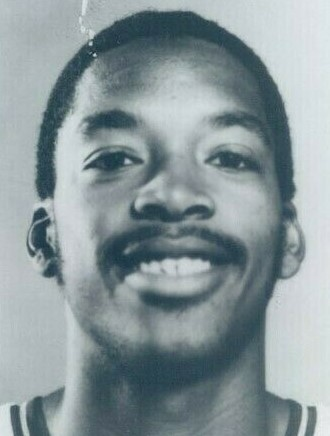
- Lever during the 1982–83 season

Personal information
- Born: August 18, 1960 (age 66) Pine Bluff, Arkansas, U.S.
- Listed height: 6 ft 3 in (1.91 m)
- Listed weight: 170 lb (77 kg)

Career information
- High school: Pueblo (Tucson, Arizona)
- College: Arizona State (1978–1982)
- NBA draft: 1982: 1st round, 11th overall pick
- Drafted by: Portland Trail Blazers
- Playing career: 1982–1994
- Position: Point guard / shooting guard
- Number: 12, 21

Career history
- 1982–1984: Portland Trail Blazers
- 1984–1990: Denver Nuggets
- 1990–1994: Dallas Mavericks

Career highlights
- 2× NBA All-Star (1988, 1990); All-NBA Second Team (1987); NBA All-Defensive Second Team (1988); No. 12 retired by Denver Nuggets; 2× First-team All-Pac-10 (1981, 1982); No. 12 jersey retired by Arizona State Sun Devils

Career NBA statistics
- Points: 10,433 (13.9 ppg)
- Rebounds: 4,523 (6.0 rpg)
- Assists: 4,696 (6.2 apg)
- Stats at NBA.com
- Stats at Basketball Reference
Medals
Men's basketball
Representing United States
FIBA U19 World Championship
Gold medal – first place	1979 Salvador	National team

Lafayette "Fat" Lever (/ˈliːvər/; born August 18, 1960) is an American former professional basketball player who played in the National Basketball Association. He later served as the director of player development for the Sacramento Kings of the NBA as well as an analyst for Kings radio broadcasts.

== Early life ==
Lever was born in Pine Bluff, Arkansas, to Elmer and Willie Lever. The second of three sons, he was nicknamed Fat by his younger brother, Elmer Jr., who had problems saying all the syllables in his name. Their father never lived with the family. In 1970, their mother, Willie, went west to work, while the brothers lived with their grandparents. The children joined their mother in Tucson, Arizona, a year later.

== Professional career ==
=== Portland Trail Blazers (1982–1984) ===
Lever was selected by the Portland Trail Blazers with the 11th pick in the 1982 NBA draft out of Arizona State. While at ASU, his guard-tandem teammate was Byron Scott, who left school early (1983) to sign with the San Diego Clippers. In his NBA debut, Lever recorded 9 points, 7 assists and 4 steals in a road loss against the Kansas City Kings. On January 20, Lever recorded his first career double-double with 14 points and 13 assists in a road loss against the Mavericks. Three days later, Lever recorded his second career double-double when he had 11 points and 10 assists in a road win over the Spurs. On March 20, Lever scored a season-high 19 points to go along with 6 assists as the Trailblazers beat the Nuggets.

During his rookie season, Lever averaged 7.8 points per game, 2.8 rebounds per game, 5.3 assists per game, and 1.9 steals per game.

The following season, on December 3, 1983, Lever scored a then-career-high 28 points off the bench, including a three point shot to send the game into overtime, during a 128–122 win over the New Jersey Nets.

=== Denver Nuggets (1984–1990) ===
Lever was considered one of the NBA's best point guards in the late 1980s while playing for the Denver Nuggets.

In his debut with the Nuggets, Lever recorded 14 points and 12 assists in a win over the Warriors. On November 6, Lever recorded a double-double of 24 points and 18 assists in a road win over the Lakers, the first time it happened in Nuggets history. On March 9 against the Pacers, Lever recorded his first career triple-double with 13 points, 15 assists and a career-high 10 steals. On April 10, Lever recorded a double-double of 26 points and 18 assists in a road loss against the Los Angeles Clippers. At that time, he joined Magic Johnson (in 1982–83) as the only players since the ABA-NBA merger to have at least 2 regular season games with 24 points and 18 assists.

In his first season with the Nuggets, Lever averaged 12.8 points per game, 5.0 rebounds per game, 7.5 assists per game, and 2.5 steals per game. The next season, Lever continued his impressive performance for the Nuggets. On November 12, 1985, Lever recorded his first 30-point double-double as he recorded 31 points, 12 assists, and 9 rebounds in a road loss to the Rockets.

Despite his size (6 feet 3 inches), Lever regularly led the Nuggets in rebounding. He is the Nuggets' all-time franchise leader in steals and was 2nd in career assists. He is one of only three players in NBA history to record 15 plus points, rebounds, and assists in a single playoff game (the others being Wilt Chamberlain and Jason Kidd).

=== Dallas Mavericks (1990–1994) ===
Lever was traded by the Nuggets to the Dallas Mavericks in 1990 for the Mavs' #9 pick in the 1990 NBA draft plus Dallas' first-round pick in the following one. The Nuggets subsequently traded the #9 pick and their own #15 pick to the Miami Heat for the Heat's #3 pick in the 1990 draft, with Denver sending the Mavs' 1991 first rounder (which was originally the Detroit Pistons' pick they acquired in the Mark Aguirre/Adrian Dantley trade) to the Washington Bullets along with Michael Adams, for the Bullets' first-round pick in the 1991 Draft.

Lever sat out the entire 1992–93 season due to knee injury. He left the Mavericks in 1994 and finished his career with averages of 13.9 points, six rebounds, 6.2 assists and 2.22 steals per game.

== Career accomplishments ==
Among Lever's career achievements were making two NBA All-Star teams, an All-NBA Second Team in 1987, and an All-Defensive Second Team in 1988.

As of the end of the 2025–26 regular season, he ranks 13th on the all-time list of most triple-doubles in the regular season with 43 over 11 seasons, ahead of players like Michael Jordan (28), Clyde Drexler (25) and Kareem Abdul-Jabbar (21). Of the top 13 triple-double career leaders, Lever is the only eligible player not in the Hall of Fame.

He ended his career as the Nuggets second leading assists leader, behind teammate Alex English, third in terms of rebounds, behind Issel and English.

On December 2, 2017, the Nuggets retired Lever's number 12 jersey during their home game against the Los Angeles Lakers, which they won 115–100.

== NBA career statistics ==
Legend
GP	Games played	GS	Games started	MPG	Minutes per game
FG%	Field goal percentage	3P%	3-point field goal percentage	FT%	Free throw percentage
RPG	Rebounds per game	APG	Assists per game	SPG	Steals per game
BPG	Blocks per game	PPG	Points per game	**Bold**	Career high

=== Regular season ===
Year	Team	GP	GS	MPG	FG%	3P%	FT%	RPG	APG	SPG	BPG	PPG
1982–83	Portland	81	45	24.9	.431	.333	.730	2.8	5.3	1.9	.2	7.8
1983–84	Portland	81	22	24.8	.447	.200	.743	2.7	4.6	1.7	.4	9.7
1984–85	Denver	**82**	**82**	31.2	.430	.250	.770	5.0	7.5	2.5	.4	12.8
1985–86	Denver	78	77	33.5	.441	.316	.725	5.4	7.5	2.3	.2	13.8
1986–87	Denver	**82**	**82**	37.2	.469	.239	.782	8.9	**8.0**	2.5	.4	18.9
1987–88	Denver	**82**	**82**	37.3	**.473**	.211	.785	8.1	7.8	**2.7**	.3	18.9
1988–89	Denver	71	71	**38.7**	.457	.348	.785	**9.3**	7.9	**2.7**	.3	**19.8**
1989–90	Denver	79	79	35.8	.443	**.414**	**.804**	**9.3**	6.5	2.1	.2	18.3
1990–91	Dallas	4	0	21.5	.391	.000	.786	3.8	3.0	1.5	**.8**	7.3
1991–92	Dallas	31	5	28.5	.387	.327	.750	5.2	3.5	1.5	.4	11.2
1993–94	Dallas	81	54	24.0	.408	.351	.765	3.5	2.6	2.0	.2	6.9
Career		752	599	31.7	.447	.310	.771	6.0	6.2	2.2	.3	13.9
All-Star		2	1	26.5	.519	.000	.875	3.5	2.5	1.0	.0	16.5

=== Playoffs ===
Year	Team	GP	GS	MPG	FG%	3P%	FT%	RPG	APG	SPG	BPG	PPG
1983	Portland	7	0	19.1	.452	.000	.800	2.0	4.4	1.0	.0	6.0
1984	Portland	5	0	15.0	.267	**.667**	.800	3.0	1.8	.8	.0	10.0
1985	Denver	**11**	8	31.1	.402	.000	.762	6.5	8.5	2.4	.2	13.3
1986	Denver	10	**10**	34.7	.450	.571	.708	4.8	5.3	2.0	.2	14.3
1987	Denver	3	3	33.0	.380	.250	.667	6.0	7.3	2.3	.0	15.3
1988	Denver	7	7	**39.0**	**.459**	.429	.788	9.3	7.0	1.9	**.6**	17.0
1989	Denver	2	2	29.0	.375	**.667**	**1.000**	6.5	**9.5**	2.0	.0	11.0
1990	Denver	3	3	37.7	.373	.143	.929	**10.7**	7.0	**2.7**	.3	**17.3**
Career		48	33	30.0	.414	.409	.775	5.8	6.2	1.9	.2	12.4

== See also ==
- List of National Basketball Association career steals leaders
- List of National Basketball Association career triple-double leaders
- List of National Basketball Association career playoff triple-double leaders
- List of National Basketball Association players with most assists in a game
- List of National Basketball Association single-game steals leaders
