= 2 Much Drama =

1999 album by C. Webb

Studio album by C. Webb
- Released: February 16, 1999
- Recorded: 1998
- Genre: Rap
- Length: 62:04
- Labels: Humility Records; Lightyear Entertainment
- Producers: Amp Fiddler; Chris Webber

Professional ratings
Review scores
Source	Rating
Allmusic	2.5/5 stars

2 Much Drama is the debut album by American basketball player Chris Webber, released under his nickname C. Webb. Released on February 16, 1999 for independent label, Lightyear Records, the single "Gangsta, Gangsta (How U Do It)" peaked at number 10 on the Hot Rap Singles chart. Guests include Redman and Kurupt.

== Track listing ==
No.	Title	Length
1.	"Intro"	0:38
2.	"All I Got"	3:07
3.	"Ride Wit Me"	3:25
4.	"Gangsta! Gangsta! (How U Do It)" (feat. Kurupt)	3:35
5.	"Been So Long"	0:58
6.	"Need Somebody"	3:54
7.	"Don't U Believe It"	0:56
8.	"Loc Down"	4:30
9.	"She Got Me"	3:32
10.	"Keepz Burnin"	4:03
11.	"Played Nomoe"	4:11
12.	"Straight Hatin"	1:12
13.	"A Whole Lotta"	4:53
14.	"Nuttin' ta Do" (feat. Redman)	4:11
15.	"My Pops"	3:26
16.	"Conspiracy"	1:46
17.	"Feel My Vibe"	3:07
18.	"Back When"	0:55
19.	"Getcha Cash"	1:53
20.	"2 Much Drama"	4:02
21.	"The Answer"	3:50
