= Untitled Nas album =

Untitled

Studio album by Nas
- Released: July 15, 2008
- Recorded: 2005 – early 2008
- Genres: Hip-hop; R&B; political hip-hop
- Length: 54:04
- Labels: The Jones Experience; Columbia; Def Jam
- Producers: Cool & Dre; DJ Green Lantern; DJ Toomp; Dustin Moore; Eric Hudson; J. Myers; Jay Electronica; Mark Batson; Mark Ronson; Polow da Don; Salaam Remi; Stargate; stic.man

Nas chronology
Hip Hop Is Dead (2006)	Untitled (2008)	Distant Relatives (2010)

Singles from Untitled
- 1. "Hero" Released: June 23, 2008; 2. "Make the World Go Round" Released: October 9, 2008

The untitled ninth studio album by American rapper Nas, commonly referred to as Nas, or simply Untitled, was released on July 15, 2008, by the Jones Experience, Columbia Records, and Def Jam Recordings. Its original title Nigger was omitted due to controversy surrounding the racial epithet. The album is distinguished for its political content, diverse sources of production, and provocative subject matter. The album features guest appearances from Chris Brown, Keri Hilson, Busta Rhymes, and the Game, among others.

The album debuted at number one on the US Billboard 200, becoming Nas' fifth to do so, and was certified gold by the Recording Industry Association of America (RIAA) for shipments of over 500,000 copies in the United States. Upon its release, the album received mixed to lightly positive reviews from critics and listeners.

== Background ==
=== Title controversy ===
The original title of the album, Nigger, was mentioned by Nas several times, as well as on an October 12, 2007, performance at the Roseland Ballroom in New York City where he announced the title and release date. Def Jam made no comment on the title. This was similar to attempts to name his 2006 album, eventually titled Hip Hop Is Dead, to both Nigga and Hip Hop Is Dead... The N. On May 19, 2008, it was confirmed that Nas changed the name of the album to an untitled one, stating that "the people will always know what the real title of this album is and what to call it." The cover of the album depicts the back of a shirtless Nas with flagellation scars forming the shape of the letter N, a reference to the racial slur and how slaves were tortured in the United States. Fort Greene, Brooklyn, assemblyman Hakeem Jeffries requested New York's Comptroller Thomas DiNapoli to withdraw $84 million from the state pension fund that has been invested into Universal and its parent company, Vivendi, if the album's title was not changed.

L.A. Reid, chairman of Def Jam at the time, confirmed that the label fully backed Nas and his decision on naming his album. The album's original title received support from Eminem, Ice Cube, Jay-Z, Bishop Lamont, Alicia Keys, LL Cool J, Rev Run, Common, Akon, Method Man, Lupe Fiasco, David Banner, GZA, and Melle Mel, while receiving criticism from 50 Cent, Will Smith, Al Sharpton, Bill O'Reilly, Oprah Winfrey, Reverend Jesse Jackson and the NAACP.

=== Production ===
Production credits for the album include stic.man of Dead Prez, DJ Green Lantern, Polow da Don, Salaam Remi, DJ Toomp, Stargate, Cool & Dre, Game, Mark Ronson, Mark Batson, Jay Electronica, J. Myers, Dustin Moore, Calvin McDaniel and Eric Hudson. Early reports of production mentioned that No I.D., DJ Khalil, Jermaine Dupri, Chris Webber and the Hitmen were contributing tracks, but their tracks failed to make the final cut for the album. DJ Premier stated in a 2009 interview with HipHopDX that he sent in a beat for Nas that Nas did not end up using on this album.

Guest artists featured on the album are Busta Rhymes, Keri Hilson, Game, Chris Brown, the Last Poets, Eban Thomas, Mulatto and Mykel. Although Jay Electronica produced the introductory track, he does not have a verse on the album, as previously stated by Nas.

== Release and promotion ==
Nas released a mixtape with DJ Green Lantern titled The Nigger Tape on June 9, 2008. The mixtape, which was released through NasIndependenceDay.com, features three songs that were later included on the album, as well as various unreleased tracks. In July 2008, it was announced that apparel company Fila would be providing financial support for the album's marketing for one year. In exchange, Nas was to wear Fila sneakers at his shows.

=== Singles ===
Prior to the release of the untitled album, Nas released a music video for "Be a Nigger Too", a song rumored to be the first single. In late June, Nas told Billboard magazine that "Be a Nigger Too" would not even be on the album because of sample clearance issues. During the same week, Nas released "Hero", the album's first official single. The song features a chorus sung by Keri Hilson, a beat produced by Polow da Don and lyrics about the music industry's stranglehold on artistry. The Game announced on BET's 106 & Park that "Make the World Go Round" is the next single of the album, which was debuted in November 2008. Nas has also released videos for "Sly Fox" and "Y'all My Niggas", however he does not appear in either of them.

== Critical reception ==
Professional ratings
Aggregate scores
Source	Rating
Metacritic	71/100
Review scores
Source	Rating
Allmusic	4/5 stars
Entertainment Weekly	B+
The Independent	5/5 stars
MSN Music (Consumer Guide)	A−
The New York Times	mixed
Pitchfork Media	3.8/10
Rolling Stone	4/5 stars
Slant Magazine	3.5/5 stars
HipHopDX	4.5/5 stars
The Village Voice	favorable

Upon its release, the album received generally positive reviews from music critics, based on an aggregate score of 71/100 from Metacritic. Entertainment Weekly credited the album for its maturity as well as the album's ability to keep the listeners guessing. Andy Greenwald credits Nas, saying "In a summer of "Lollipop", it's good to hear a complicated record that doesn't shy from grown-up ambition." The album received a 4.5 mic rating from The Source magazine. The Independent's Andy Gill gave it 5 out of 5 stars and described it as "probably the most politically oriented rap album since the days of Public Enemy and The Disposable Heroes of Hiphoprisy". In contrast, Los Angeles Times writer Jeff Weiss gave the album 2 out of 4 stars and wrote unfavorably of Nas's lyrics, perceiving his themes as hypocritical and inconsistent.

Despite calling its production "sporadically successful and widely uneven", Slant Magazine's Jimmy Newlin gave the album 3½ out of 5 stars and commended Nas's lyricism, calling its lyrics "all terrific". Jody Rosen of Rolling Stone gave the album 4 out of 5 stars and called it a "sprawling, furious, deeply ambivalent theme album about institutional racism, the failures of black leadership and the pathologies and promise of early-21st-century African-American life". USA Today's Elysa Gardner gave it 3 out of 4 stars and wrote "Nas reconfirms his status as one of rap’s most deft, thoughtful rhymers and his knack for trenchant, defiant commentary". On December 3, it was announced that the album had been nominated for the Grammy Award for Best Rap Album, but it ended up losing to Lil Wayne's Tha Carter III (2008).

== Commercial performance ==
The album debuted at number one on the Billboard 200 album charts selling 187,078 copies in the first week of release. On September 11, 2008, the album was certified gold by the Recording Industry Association of America (RIAA) for sales of over 500,000 copies in the United States.

== Track listing ==
No.	Title	Writer(s)	Producer(s)	Length
1.	"Queens Get the Money"	Nasir Jones; Timothy Thedford; Yann Tiersen	Jay Electronica	2:12
2.	"You Can't Stop Us Now" (featuring Eban Thomas)	Jones; Eban Thomas; Abiodun Oyewole; Umar Bin Hassan; Carlos Herndon; Garnett Jones; Gerard Pinkney	Salaam Remi	3:05
3.	"Breathe"	Jones; Dustin Moore; J. Myers	Dustin Moore, J. Myers	3:34
4.	"Make the World Go Round" (featuring Chris Brown and the Game)	Jones; Christopher Brown; Jayceon Taylor; Marcello Valenzano; Andre Lyons	Cool & Dre, the Game	3:49
5.	"Hero" (featuring Keri Hilson)	Jones; Keri Hilson; Jamal Jones; Amber Rives; J. Sublett; C. Haynes	Polow da Don	4:00
6.	"America"	Jones; Mikkel Eriksen; Tor Hermansen	Stargate	3:52
7.	"Sly Fox"	Jones; Clayton Gavin	stic.man	4:23
8.	"Testify"	Jones; Mark Batson	Mark Batson	2:46
9.	"N.I.G.G.E.R. (The Slave and the Master)"	Jones; Aldrin Davis; Phil Hurtt; A. Bell	DJ Toomp	4:33
10.	"Untitled"	Jones; Gavin	stic.man	2:51
11.	"Fried Chicken" (featuring Busta Rhymes)	Jones; Trevor Smith Jr.; Mark Ronson	Mark Ronson	2:50
12.	"Project Roach" (featuring the Last Poets)	Jones; Oyewole; Hassan; Eric Hudson	Eric Hudson	1:48
13.	"Y'all My Niggas"	Jones; J. Myers	J. Myers	4:16
14.	"We're Not Alone" (featuring Mykel)	Jones; Gavin; Don Mykel	stic.man	5:40
15.	"Black President"	Jones; James D'Agostino; Tupac Shakur; D.K. McDowell; Larry Troutman; Lawrence Goodman; Roger Troutman	DJ Green Lantern	4:29
Total length:				54:04

United Kingdom iTunes Store bonus track
No.	Title	Writer(s)	Producer(s)	Length
16.	"Like Me"	Jones; D'Agostino	DJ Green Lantern	3:47
Total length:				57:51

iTunes Store pre-order bonus track
No.	Title	Writer(s)	Producer(s)	Length
17.	"Proclamation"	Jones	Nas	0:59
Total length:				58:50

Leftover track

- "Be a Nigger Too"

Samples

- "Queens Get the Money" contains samples from "Summer '78 (Instrumental)" by Yann Tiersen.
- "You Can't Stop Us Now" contains interpolations from "Message from a Blackman" by the Whatnauts.
- "N.I.G.G.E.R. (The Slave and the Master)" contains samples from "We're Just Trying to Make It" by the Persuaders.
- "Black President" contains samples from "I Wonder If Heaven Got a Ghetto" by 2Pac and speeches from Barack Obama.

== Personnel ==
- Nasir Jones – executive producer
- Antonio "L.A." Reid – executive producer
- A. Saleh – executive producer, A&R, management
- Chris Gehringer – mastering
- Terese Joseph – A&R administration
- Leesa D. Brunson – A&R coordination
- Shakir Stewart – A&R for Def Jam
- Shari Bryant – marketing
- N. Jones – management
- Kenny Meiselas ESQ – legal representation
- Paul Rothenberg ESQ – legal representation
- Tavon Sampson – art direction and design
- Mieeno Peluce – cover photography
- Tavon Sampson – cover illustration and design
- Eric Altenburger – cover illustration and design
- Carol Corless – package production
- Deborah Mannis-Gardner for DMG Clearances, Inc – sample clearance agent
- Michael Seltzer – business affairs
- Antoinette Trotman – business affairs
- Ian Allen – business affairs
- Corbis – booklet images
- Getty Images – booklet images

== Charts ==
=== Weekly charts ===
Chart (2008)	Peak position
Australian Albums Chart	55
Belgian Albums (Ultratop Flanders)	89
Canadian Albums Chart	5
French Albums (SNEP)	45
Irish Albums Chart	54
Japanese Albums (Oricon)	35
Norwegian Albums (VG-lista)	31
Swiss Albums (Schweizer Hitparade)	10
UK Albums Chart	23
US Billboard 200	1
US Top R&B/Hip-Hop Albums (Billboard)	1
US Top Rap Albums (Billboard)	1

=== Year-end charts ===
Chart (2008)	Peak position
US Billboard 200	100
US Top R&B/Hip-Hop Albums (Billboard)	21
US Top Rap Albums (Billboard)	9

== Certifications ==
Region	Certification	Certified units/sales
United States (RIAA)	Gold	500,000^{^}
^{^} Shipments figures based on certification alone.

== Release history ==
Region	Date
Canada	July 11, 2008
Germany	July 11, 2008
Ireland	July 11, 2008
France	July 14, 2008
United Kingdom	July 14, 2008
Australasia	July 15, 2008
United States	July 15, 2008

== Other sources ==
- "Hip Hop Music Download ". Hipcoded. September 29, 2023.
