= List of NBA career triple-double leaders =

This article provides three lists:

A list of the top 25 National Basketball Association players by total career regular season triple-doubles recorded.

A progressive list of regular season triple-double leaders showing how the record increased through the years.

A list of facts of triple-double achievements.

== Triple-double leaders ==
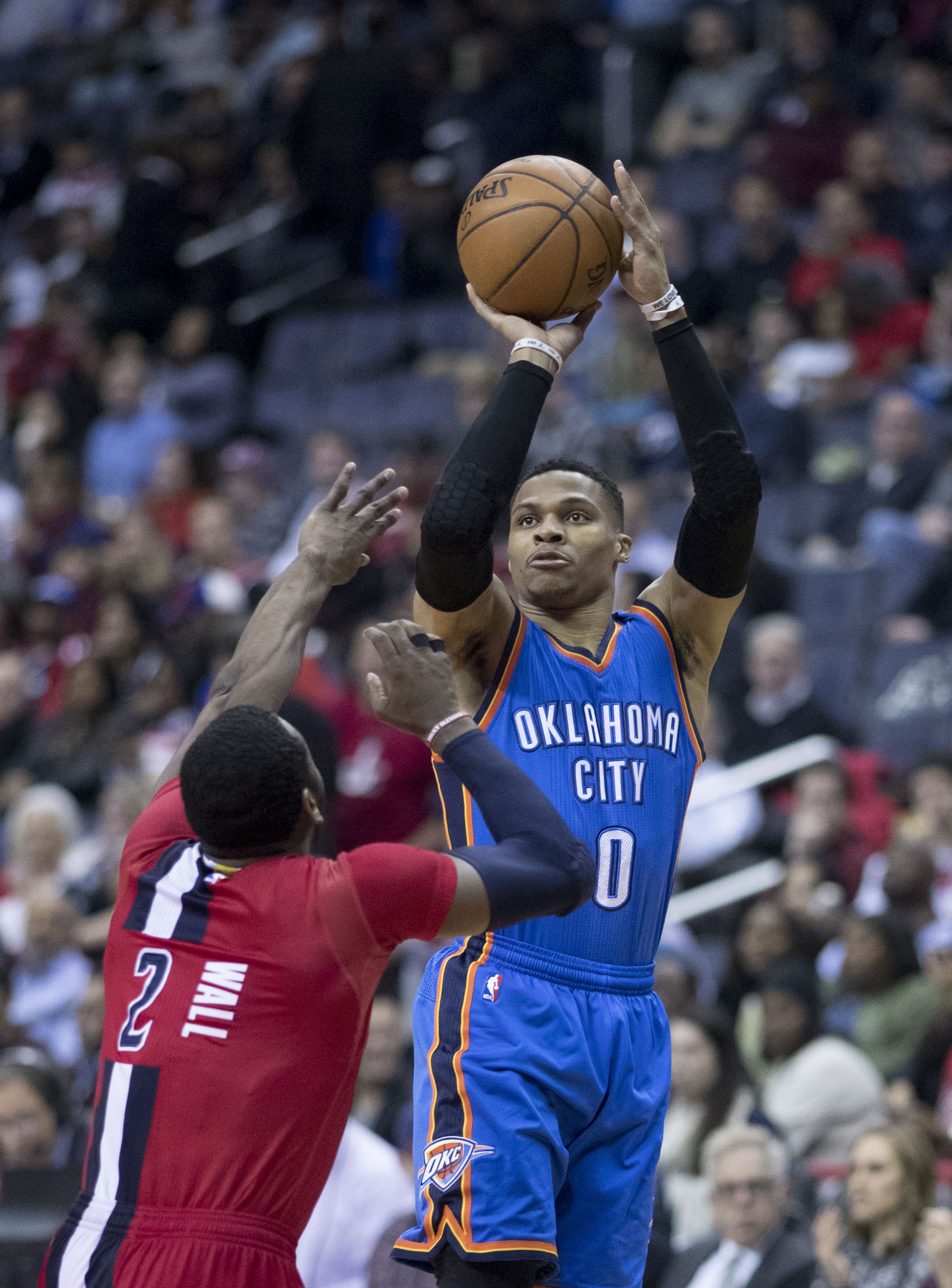
Russell Westbrook holds the record for the most NBA career regular season triple-doubles and the record for the most triple-doubles in a single season.

Statistics accurate as of November 18, 2026.

^	Denotes active player
*	Inducted into the Naismith Memorial Basketball Hall of Fame
†	Not yet eligible for Hall of Fame consideration (Note: A player is not eligible for induction into the Naismith Memorial Basketball Hall of Fame until he has been fully retired for three calendar years.)

Rank	Name	Pos	Team(s) played for (years) (Note: American Basketball Association (ABA) teams other than those admitted into the NBA in 1976 are not included; each year is linked to an article about that particular NBA season.)	Total triple- doubles	Games played	Points per game (Note: Rounded to the nearest tenth.)	Rebounds per game (Note: Average is rounded to the nearest tenth.)	Assists per game
1	Russell Westbrook	PG	Oklahoma City Thunder (2008–2019); Houston Rockets (2019–2020); Washington Wizards (2020–2021); Los Angeles Lakers (2021–2023); Los Angeles Clippers (2023–2024); Denver Nuggets (2024–2025); Sacramento Kings (2025–2026)	209	1,301	20.9	6.9	8.0
2	Nikola Jokić^	C	Denver Nuggets (2015–present)	201	823	22.3	11.1	7.5
3	Oscar Robertson*	PG	Cincinnati Royals (1960–1970); Milwaukee Bucks (1970–1974)	181	1,040	25.7	7.5	9.5
4	Magic Johnson*	PG	Los Angeles Lakers (1979–1991, 1996)	138	906	19.5	7.2	11.2
5	LeBron James^	SF	Cleveland Cavaliers (2003–2010, 2014–2018); Miami Heat (2010–2014); Los Angeles Lakers (2018–2026); Philadelphia 76ers (2026–present)	125	1,634	26.7	7.5	7.4
6	Jason Kidd*	PG	Dallas Mavericks (1994–1996, 2008–2012); Phoenix Suns (1996–2001); New Jersey Nets (2001–2008); New York Knicks (2012–2013)	107	1,391	12.6	6.3	8.7
7	Luka Dončić^	PG	Dallas Mavericks (2018–2025); Los Angeles Lakers (2025–present)	90	528	29.5	8.5	8.2
8	James Harden^	SG/PG	Oklahoma City Thunder (2009–2012); Houston Rockets (2012–2021); Brooklyn Nets (2021–2022); Philadelphia 76ers (2022–2023); Los Angeles Clippers (2023–2026); Cleveland Cavaliers (2026)	82	1,236	23.9	5.6	7.3
9	Wilt Chamberlain*	C	Philadelphia/San Francisco Warriors (1959–1965); Philadelphia 76ers (1965–1968); Los Angeles Lakers (1968–1973)	78	1,045	30.1	22.9	4.4
10	Domantas Sabonis^	C/PF	Oklahoma City Thunder (2016–2017); Indiana Pacers (2017–2022); Sacramento Kings (2022–present)	69	678	16.0	10.7	4.9
11	Larry Bird*	SF/PF	Boston Celtics (1979–1992)	59	897	24.3	10.0	6.4
12	Giannis Antetokounmpo^	PF	Milwaukee Bucks (2013–2026); Miami Heat (2026–present)	58	910	24.1	10.0	5.0
13	Fat Lever	PG	Portland Trail Blazers (1982–1984); Denver Nuggets (1984–1990); Dallas Mavericks (1990–1994)	43	752	13.9	6.0	6.2
14	Bob Cousy*	PG	Boston Celtics (1950–1963); Cincinnati Royals (1969–1970)	33	924	18.4	5.2	7.5
14	Draymond Green^	PF	Golden State Warriors (2012–present)	33	962	8.6	6.8	5.6
14	Ben Simmons^	PG	Philadelphia 76ers (2016–2022); Brooklyn Nets (2022–2025); Los Angeles Clippers (2025)	33	383	13.1	7.4	7.2
17	Josh Giddey^	PG	Oklahoma City Thunder (2021–2024); Chicago Bulls (2024–present)	32	348	14.4	7.6	6.7
17	Rajon Rondo	PG	Boston Celtics (2006–2014); Dallas Mavericks (2014–2015); Sacramento Kings (2015–2016); Chicago Bulls (2016–2017); New Orleans Pelicans (2017–2018); Los Angeles Lakers (2018–2020, 2021–2022); Atlanta Hawks (2020–2021); Los Angeles Clippers (2021); Cleveland Cavaliers (2022)	32	957	9.8	4.5	7.9
19	John Havlicek*	SF	Boston Celtics (1962–1978)	31	1,270	20.8	6.3	4.8
20	Grant Hill*	SF	Detroit Pistons (1994–2000); Orlando Magic (2000–2007); Phoenix Suns (2007–2012); Los Angeles Clippers (2012–2013)	29	1,026	16.7	6.0	4.1
21	Michael Jordan*	SG	Chicago Bulls (1984–1993, 1995–1998); Washington Wizards (2001–2003)	28	1,072	30.1	6.2	5.3
22	Elgin Baylor*	SF	Minneapolis/Los Angeles Lakers (1958–1971)	26	846	27.4	13.5	4.3
23	Clyde Drexler*	SG	Portland Trail Blazers (1983–1995); Houston Rockets (1995–1998)	25	1,086	20.4	6.1	5.6
24	Walt Frazier*	PG	New York Knicks (1967–1977); Cleveland Cavaliers (1977–1979)	23	825	18.9	5.9	6.1
25	Kareem Abdul-Jabbar*	C	Milwaukee Bucks (1969–1975); Los Angeles Lakers (1975–1989)	21	1,560	24.6	11.2	3.6
25	Kobe Bryant*	SG	Los Angeles Lakers (1996–2016)	21	1,346	25.0	5.2	4.7
25	Kyle Lowry^{†}	PG	Memphis Grizzlies (2006–2009); Houston Rockets (2009–2012); Toronto Raptors (2012–2021); Miami Heat (2021–2024); Philadelphia 76ers (2024–2026)	21	1,186	13.8	4.2	6.0
25	Micheal Ray Richardson	PG	New York Knicks (1978–1982); Golden State Warriors (1982–1983); New Jersey Nets (1983–1986)	21	556	14.8	5.5	7.0
25	Chris Webber*	PF	Golden State Warriors (1993–1994, 2008); Washington Bullets / Wizards (1994–1998); Sacramento Kings (1998–2005); Philadelphia 76ers (2005–2007); Detroit Pistons (2007)	21	831	20.7	9.8	4.2

== Progressive list of triple-double leaders ==
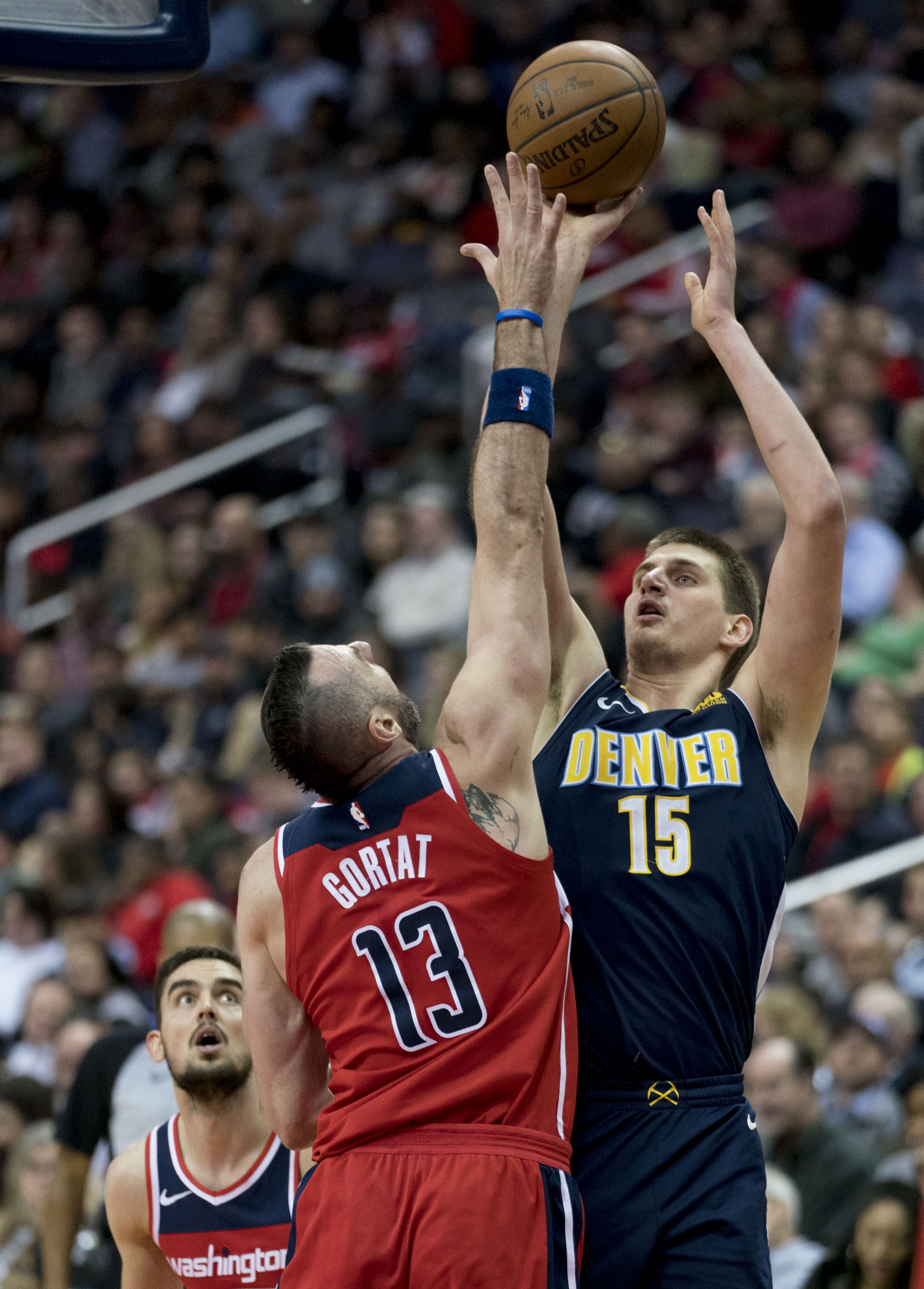
Nikola Jokić is second in NBA career regular season triple-doubles, holds the record for the fastest triple-double, and has the highest triple-double to game ratio.

This is a progressive list of triple-double leaders showing how the record increased through the years.

^	Active NBA player
*	Inducted into the Naismith Memorial Basketball Hall of Fame
†	Not yet eligible for Hall of Fame consideration

Statistics accurate as of November 18, 2026.

Team abbreviationsTeam(s) listed is the one player was on when he established the record.
BOS	Boston Celtics	HOU	Houston Rockets	NOJ	New Orleans Jazz	SAC	Sacramento Kings
BUF	Buffalo Braves	IND	Indiana Pacers	NYK	New York Knicks	SAS	San Antonio Spurs
CHI	Chicago Bulls	LAC	Los Angeles Clippers	OKC	Oklahoma City Thunder	SEA	Seattle SuperSonics
CIN	Cincinnati Royals	LAL	Los Angeles Lakers	PHI	Philadelphia 76ers	SYR	Syracuse Nationals
CLE	Cleveland Cavaliers	MIA	Miami Heat	PHW	Philadelphia Warriors	WAS	Washington Wizards
DAL	Dallas Mavericks	MIL	Milwaukee Bucks	PHX	Phoenix Suns		
DEN	Denver Nuggets	MIN	Minnesota Timberwolves	POR	Portland Trail Blazers		
DET	Detroit Pistons	NJN	New Jersey Nets	ROC	Rochester Royals		

Triple-doubles leader at the end of every season
Season	Year-by-year leader	TD3	Active player leader	TD3	Career record	TD3	Single-season record	TD3	Season
1950–51	Andy Phillip*PHW	5	Andy Phillip*PHW	5	Andy Phillip*PHW	5	Andy Phillip*PHW	5	1950–51
1951–52	Andy Phillip*PHW	4	Andy Phillip*PHW	9	Andy Phillip*PHW	9	Andy Phillip*PHW	5	1951–52
1952–53	Bob Cousy*BOS	5	Bob Cousy*BOS; Andy Phillip*PHW	10	Bob Cousy*BOS; Andy Phillip*PHW	10	Bob Cousy*BOS; Andy Phillip*PHW	5	1952–53
1953–54	Bob Cousy*BOS	2	Bob Cousy*BOS	12	Bob Cousy*BOS	12	Bob Cousy*BOS; Andy Phillip*PHW	5	1953–54
1954–55	Bob Cousy*BOS	3	Bob Cousy*BOS	15	Bob Cousy*BOS	15	Bob Cousy*BOS; Andy Phillip*PHW	5	1954–55
1955–56	Bob Cousy*BOS	8	Bob Cousy*BOS	23	Bob Cousy*BOS	23	Bob Cousy*BOS	8	1955–56
1956–57	Red KerrSYR Maurice Stokes*ROC; Neil Johnston*PHW	1	Bob Cousy*BOS	23	Bob Cousy*BOS	23	Bob Cousy*BOS	8	1956–57
1957–58	Maurice Stokes*CIN	9	Bob Cousy*BOS	24	Bob Cousy*BOS	24	Maurice Stokes*CIN	9	1957–58
1958–59	Guy Rodgers*PHW; Bob Cousy*BOS	3	Bob Cousy*BOS	27	Bob Cousy*BOS	27	Maurice Stokes*CIN	9	1958–59
1959–60	Tom Gola*PHW	9	Bob Cousy*BOS	31	Bob Cousy*BOS	31	Maurice Stokes*CIN; Tom Gola*PHW	9	1959–60
1960–61	Oscar Robertson*CIN	26	Bob Cousy*BOS	32	Bob Cousy*BOS	32	Oscar Robertson*CIN	26	1960–61
1961–62	Oscar Robertson*CIN	41	Oscar Robertson*; CIN 1961–70; MIL 1970–74	67	Oscar Robertson*; CIN 1961–70; MIL 1970–74	67	Oscar Robertson*CIN	41	1961–62
1962–63	Oscar Robertson*CIN	20	Oscar Robertson*; CIN 1961–70; MIL 1970–74	87	Oscar Robertson*; CIN 1961–70; MIL 1970–74	87	Oscar Robertson*CIN	41	1962–63
1963–64	Oscar Robertson*CIN	26	Oscar Robertson*; CIN 1961–70; MIL 1970–74	113	Oscar Robertson*; CIN 1961–70; MIL 1970–74	113	Oscar Robertson*CIN	41	1963–64
1964–65	Oscar Robertson*CIN	22	Oscar Robertson*; CIN 1961–70; MIL 1970–74	135	Oscar Robertson*; CIN 1961–70; MIL 1970–74	135	Oscar Robertson*CIN	41	1964–65
1965–66	Oscar Robertson*CIN	13	Oscar Robertson*; CIN 1961–70; MIL 1970–74	148	Oscar Robertson*; CIN 1961–70; MIL 1970–74	148	Oscar Robertson*CIN	41	1965–66
1966–67	Wilt Chamberlain*PHI	22	Oscar Robertson*; CIN 1961–70; MIL 1970–74	155	Oscar Robertson*; CIN 1961–70; MIL 1970–74	155	Oscar Robertson*CIN	41	1966–67
1967–68	Wilt Chamberlain*PHI	31	Oscar Robertson*; CIN 1961–70; MIL 1970–74	163	Oscar Robertson*; CIN 1961–70; MIL 1970–74	163	Oscar Robertson*CIN	41	1967–68
1968–69	Walt Frazier*NYK	8	Oscar Robertson*; CIN 1961–70; MIL 1970–74	170	Oscar Robertson*; CIN 1961–70; MIL 1970–74	170	Oscar Robertson*CIN	41	1968–69
1969–70	John Havlicek*BOS	8	Oscar Robertson*; CIN 1961–70; MIL 1970–74	176	Oscar Robertson*; CIN 1961–70; MIL 1970–74	176	Oscar Robertson*CIN	41	1969–70
1970–71	Norm Van LierCIN	12	Oscar Robertson*; CIN 1961–70; MIL 1970–74	179	Oscar Robertson*; CIN 1961–70; MIL 1970–74	179	Oscar Robertson*CIN	41	1970–71
1971–72	John Havlicek*BOS	8	Oscar Robertson*; CIN 1961–70; MIL 1970–74	179	Oscar Robertson*; CIN 1961–70; MIL 1970–74	179	Oscar Robertson*CIN	41	1971–72
1972–73	Bob KauffmanBUF Jerry Lucas*NYK Sidney WicksPOR	4	Oscar Robertson*; CIN 1961–70; MIL 1970–74	179	Oscar Robertson*; CIN 1961–70; MIL 1970–74	179	Oscar Robertson*CIN	41	1972–73
1973–74	Elmore SmithLAL	6	Oscar Robertson*; CIN 1961–70; MIL 1970–74	181	Oscar Robertson*; CIN 1961–70; MIL 1970–74	181	Oscar Robertson*CIN	41	1973–74
1974–75	Pete Maravich*NOJ	5	John Havlicek*BOS	31	Oscar Robertson*; CIN 1961–70; MIL 1970–74	181	Oscar Robertson*CIN	41	1974–75
1975–76	Kareem Abdul-Jabbar*LAL Alvan AdamsPHX George McGinnis*PHI	5	John Havlicek*BOS	31	Oscar Robertson*; CIN 1961–70; MIL 1970–74	181	Oscar Robertson*CIN	41	1975–76
1976–77	Alvan AdamsPHX	3	John Havlicek*BOS	31	Oscar Robertson*; CIN 1961–70; MIL 1970–74	181	Oscar Robertson*CIN	41	1976–77
1977–78	Dave Cowens*BOS; Bill Walton*POR	2	John Havlicek*BOS	31	Oscar Robertson*; CIN 1961–70; MIL 1970–74	181	Oscar Robertson*CIN	41	1977–78
1978–79	Mickey JohnsonCHI	4	Walt Frazier*CLE	23	Oscar Robertson*; CIN 1961–70; MIL 1970–74	181	Oscar Robertson*CIN	41	1978–79
1979–80	Magic Johnson*LAL Micheal Ray RichardsonNYK	7	Walt Frazier*CLE	23	Oscar Robertson*; CIN 1961–70; MIL 1970–74	181	Oscar Robertson*CIN	41	1979–80
1980–81	Magic Johnson*LAL	6	Kareem Abdul-Jabbar*LAL	20	Oscar Robertson*; CIN 1961–70; MIL 1970–74	181	Oscar Robertson*CIN	41	1980–81
1981–82	Magic Johnson*LAL	18	Magic Johnson*LAL	31	Oscar Robertson*; CIN 1961–70; MIL 1970–74	181	Oscar Robertson*CIN	41	1981–82
1982–83	Magic Johnson*LAL	16	Magic Johnson*LAL	47	Oscar Robertson*; CIN 1961–70; MIL 1970–74	181	Oscar Robertson*CIN	41	1982–83
1983–84	Magic Johnson*LAL	12	Magic Johnson*LAL	59	Oscar Robertson*; CIN 1961–70; MIL 1970–74	181	Oscar Robertson*CIN	41	1983–84
1984–85	Magic Johnson*LAL	11	Magic Johnson*LAL	70	Oscar Robertson*; CIN 1961–70; MIL 1970–74	181	Oscar Robertson*CIN	41	1984–85
1985–86	Larry Bird*BOS	10	Magic Johnson*LAL	73	Oscar Robertson*; CIN 1961–70; MIL 1970–74	181	Oscar Robertson*CIN	41	1985–86
1986–87	Fat LeverDEN	16	Magic Johnson*LAL	84	Oscar Robertson*; CIN 1961–70; MIL 1970–74	181	Oscar Robertson*CIN	41	1986–87
1987–88	Magic Johnson*LAL	12	Magic Johnson*LAL	96	Oscar Robertson*; CIN 1961–70; MIL 1970–74	181	Oscar Robertson*CIN	41	1987–88
1988–89	Magic Johnson*LAL	17	Magic Johnson*LAL	113	Oscar Robertson*; CIN 1961–70; MIL 1970–74	181	Oscar Robertson*CIN	41	1988–89
1989–90	Magic Johnson*LAL	11	Magic Johnson*LAL	124	Oscar Robertson*; CIN 1961–70; MIL 1970–74	181	Oscar Robertson*CIN	41	1989–90
1990–91	Magic Johnson*LAL	13	Magic Johnson*LAL	137	Oscar Robertson*; CIN 1961–70; MIL 1970–74	181	Oscar Robertson*CIN	41	1990–91
1991–92	Michael Jordan*CHI; Gary Payton*SEA; Scottie Pippen*CHI; David Robinson*SAS	2	Larry Bird*BOS	59	Oscar Robertson*; CIN 1961–70; MIL 1970–74	181	Oscar Robertson*CIN	41	1991–92
1992–93	Charles Barkley*PHX	6	Michael Jordan*CHI	27	Oscar Robertson*; CIN 1961–70; MIL 1970–74	181	Oscar Robertson*CIN	41	1992–93
1993–94	David Robinson*SAS	5	Fat LeverDAL	43	Oscar Robertson*; CIN 1961–70; MIL 1970–74	181	Oscar Robertson*CIN	41	1993–94
1994–95	Jason Kidd*DAL	4	Michael Jordan*CHI	27	Oscar Robertson*; CIN 1961–70; MIL 1970–74	181	Oscar Robertson*CIN	41	1994–95
1995–96	Grant Hill*DET	10	Magic Johnson*LAL	138	Oscar Robertson*; CIN 1961–70; MIL 1970–74	181	Oscar Robertson*CIN	41	1995–96
1996–97	Grant Hill*DET	13	Michael Jordan*CHI	28	Oscar Robertson*; CIN 1961–70; MIL 1970–74	181	Oscar Robertson*CIN	41	1996–97
1997–98	Grant Hill*DET; Jason Kidd*PHX	4	Grant Hill*DET; Michael Jordan*CHI	28	Oscar Robertson*; CIN 1961–70; MIL 1970–74	181	Oscar Robertson*CIN	41	1997–98
1998–99	Jason Kidd*PHX	7	Grant Hill*DET	29	Oscar Robertson*; CIN 1961–70; MIL 1970–74	181	Oscar Robertson*CIN	41	1998–99
1999–00	Jason Kidd*PHX; Chris Webber*SAC	5	Jason Kidd*; PHX 1999–01; NJN 2001–08; DAL 2008–12; NYK 2012–13	31	Oscar Robertson*; CIN 1961–70; MIL 1970–74	181	Oscar Robertson*CIN	41	1999–00
2000–01	Jason Kidd*; PHX 2000–01; NJN 2001–02	7	Jason Kidd*; PHX 1999–01; NJN 2001–08; DAL 2008–12; NYK 2012–13	38	Oscar Robertson*; CIN 1961–70; MIL 1970–74	181	Oscar Robertson*CIN	41	2000–01
2001–02	Jason Kidd*; PHX 2000–01; NJN 2001–02	8	Jason Kidd*; PHX 1999–01; NJN 2001–08; DAL 2008–12; NYK 2012–13	46	Oscar Robertson*; CIN 1961–70; MIL 1970–74	181	Oscar Robertson*CIN	41	2001–02
2002–03	Kevin Garnett*MIN	6	Jason Kidd*; PHX 1999–01; NJN 2001–08; DAL 2008–12; NYK 2012–13	50	Oscar Robertson*; CIN 1961–70; MIL 1970–74	181	Oscar Robertson*CIN	41	2002–03
2003–04	Jason Kidd*; NJN 2003–08; DAL 2008	9	Jason Kidd*; PHX 1999–01; NJN 2001–08; DAL 2008–12; NYK 2012–13	59	Oscar Robertson*; CIN 1961–70; MIL 1970–74	181	Oscar Robertson*CIN	41	2003–04
2004–05	Jason Kidd*; NJN 2003–08; DAL 2008	8	Jason Kidd*; PHX 1999–01; NJN 2001–08; DAL 2008–12; NYK 2012–13	67	Oscar Robertson*; CIN 1961–70; MIL 1970–74	181	Oscar Robertson*CIN	41	2004–05
2005–06	Jason Kidd*; NJN 2003–08; DAL 2008	8	Jason Kidd*; PHX 1999–01; NJN 2001–08; DAL 2008–12; NYK 2012–13	75	Oscar Robertson*; CIN 1961–70; MIL 1970–74	181	Oscar Robertson*CIN	41	2005–06
2006–07	Jason Kidd*; NJN 2003–08; DAL 2008	12	Jason Kidd*; PHX 1999–01; NJN 2001–08; DAL 2008–12; NYK 2012–13	87	Oscar Robertson*; CIN 1961–70; MIL 1970–74	181	Oscar Robertson*CIN	41	2006–07
2007–08	Jason Kidd*; NJN 2003–08; DAL 2008	13	Jason Kidd*; PHX 1999–01; NJN 2001–08; DAL 2008–12; NYK 2012–13	100	Oscar Robertson*; CIN 1961–70; MIL 1970–74	181	Oscar Robertson*CIN	41	2007–08
2008–09	LeBron James^ CLE 2008–10; MIA 2010–11	7	Jason Kidd*; PHX 1999–01; NJN 2001–08; DAL 2008–12; NYK 2012–13	103	Oscar Robertson*; CIN 1961–70; MIL 1970–74	181	Oscar Robertson*CIN	41	2008–09
2009–10	LeBron James^ CLE 2008–10; MIA 2010–11	4	Jason Kidd*; PHX 1999–01; NJN 2001–08; DAL 2008–12; NYK 2012–13	105	Oscar Robertson*; CIN 1961–70; MIL 1970–74	181	Oscar Robertson*CIN	41	2009–10
2010–11	LeBron James^ CLE 2008–10; MIA 2010–11	4	Jason Kidd*; PHX 1999–01; NJN 2001–08; DAL 2008–12; NYK 2012–13	107	Oscar Robertson*; CIN 1961–70; MIL 1970–74	181	Oscar Robertson*CIN	41	2010–11
2011–12	Rajon Rondo BOS	6	Jason Kidd*; PHX 1999–01; NJN 2001–08; DAL 2008–12; NYK 2012–13	107	Oscar Robertson*; CIN 1961–70; MIL 1970–74	181	Oscar Robertson*CIN	41	2011–12
2012–13	Rajon Rondo BOS	5	Jason Kidd*; PHX 1999–01; NJN 2001–08; DAL 2008–12; NYK 2012–13	107	Oscar Robertson*; CIN 1961–70; MIL 1970–74	181	Oscar Robertson*CIN	41	2012–13
2013–14	Lance StephensonIND	5	LeBron James^ MIA 2013–14; CLE 2014–16	37	Oscar Robertson*; CIN 1961–70; MIL 1970–74	181	Oscar Robertson*CIN	41	2013–14
2014–15	Russell Westbrook^{†}OKC	11	LeBron James^ MIA 2013–14; CLE 2014–16	39	Oscar Robertson*; CIN 1961–70; MIL 1970–74	181	Oscar Robertson*CIN	41	2014–15
2015–16	Russell Westbrook^{†}OKC	18	LeBron James^ MIA 2013–14; CLE 2014–16	42	Oscar Robertson*; CIN 1961–70; MIL 1970–74	181	Oscar Robertson*CIN	41	2015–16
2016–17	Russell Westbrook^{†}OKC	42	Russell Westbrook^{†} OKC 2016–19; HOU 2019–20; WAS 2020–21; LAL 2021–23; LAC 2023–24; DEN 2024–25; SAC 2025–26	79	Oscar Robertson*; CIN 1961–70; MIL 1970–74	181	Russell Westbrook^{†}OKC	42	2016–17
2017–18	Russell Westbrook^{†}OKC	25	Russell Westbrook^{†} OKC 2016–19; HOU 2019–20; WAS 2020–21; LAL 2021–23; LAC 2023–24; DEN 2024–25; SAC 2025–26	104	Oscar Robertson*; CIN 1961–70; MIL 1970–74	181	Russell Westbrook^{†}OKC	42	2017–18
2018–19	Russell Westbrook^{†}OKC	34	Russell Westbrook^{†} OKC 2016–19; HOU 2019–20; WAS 2020–21; LAL 2021–23; LAC 2023–24; DEN 2024–25; SAC 2025–26	138	Oscar Robertson*; CIN 1961–70; MIL 1970–74	181	Russell Westbrook^{†}OKC	42	2018–19
2019–20	Luka Dončić^DAL	17	Russell Westbrook^{†} OKC 2016–19; HOU 2019–20; WAS 2020–21; LAL 2021–23; LAC 2023–24; DEN 2024–25; SAC 2025–26	146	Oscar Robertson*; CIN 1961–70; MIL 1970–74	181	Russell Westbrook^{†}OKC	42	2019–20
2020–21	Russell Westbrook^{†}WAS	38	Russell Westbrook^{†} OKC 2016–19; HOU 2019–20; WAS 2020–21; LAL 2021–23; LAC 2023–24; DEN 2024–25; SAC 2025–26	184	Russell Westbrook^{†} WAS 2020–21; LAL 2021–23; LAC 2023–24; DEN 2024–25; SAC 2025–26	184	Russell Westbrook^{†}OKC	42	2020–21
2021–22	Nikola Jokić^DEN	19	Russell Westbrook^{†} OKC 2016–19; HOU 2019–20; WAS 2020–21; LAL 2021–23; LAC 2023–24; DEN 2024–25; SAC 2025–26	194	Russell Westbrook^{†} WAS 2020–21; LAL 2021–23; LAC 2023–24; DEN 2024–25; SAC 2025–26	194	Russell Westbrook^{†}OKC	42	2021–22
2022–23	Nikola Jokić^DEN	29	Russell Westbrook^{†} OKC 2016–19; HOU 2019–20; WAS 2020–21; LAL 2021–23; LAC 2023–24; DEN 2024–25; SAC 2025–26	198	Russell Westbrook^{†} WAS 2020–21; LAL 2021–23; LAC 2023–24; DEN 2024–25; SAC 2025–26	198	Russell Westbrook^{†}OKC	42	2022–23
2023–24	Domantas Sabonis^SAC	26	Russell Westbrook^{†} OKC 2016–19; HOU 2019–20; WAS 2020–21; LAL 2021–23; LAC 2023–24; DEN 2024–25; SAC 2025–26	199	Russell Westbrook^{†} WAS 2020–21; LAL 2021–23; LAC 2023–24; DEN 2024–25; SAC 2025–26	199	Russell Westbrook^{†}OKC	42	2023–24
2024–25	Nikola Jokić^DEN	34	Russell Westbrook^{†} OKC 2016–19; HOU 2019–20; WAS 2020–21; LAL 2021–23; LAC 2023–24; DEN 2024–25; SAC 2025–26	203	Russell Westbrook^{†} WAS 2020–21; LAL 2021–23; LAC 2023–24; DEN 2024–25; SAC 2025–26	203	Russell Westbrook^{†}OKC	42	2024–25
2025–26	Nikola Jokić^DEN	34	Russell Westbrook^{†} OKC 2016–19; HOU 2019–20; WAS 2020–21; LAL 2021–23; LAC 2023–24; DEN 2024–25; SAC 2025–26	209	Russell Westbrook^{†} WAS 2020–21; LAL 2021–23; LAC 2023–24; DEN 2024–25; SAC 2025–26	209	Russell Westbrook^{†}OKC	42	2025–26
2026–27	Nikola Jokić^DEN	3	Nikola Jokić^DEN	201	Russell Westbrook^{†} WAS 2020–21; LAL 2021–23; LAC 2023–24; DEN 2024–25; SAC 2025–26	209	Russell Westbrook^{†}OKC	42	2026–27
Season	Year-by-year leader	TD3	Active player leader	TD3	Career record	TD3	Single-season record	TD3	Season

== Facts ==
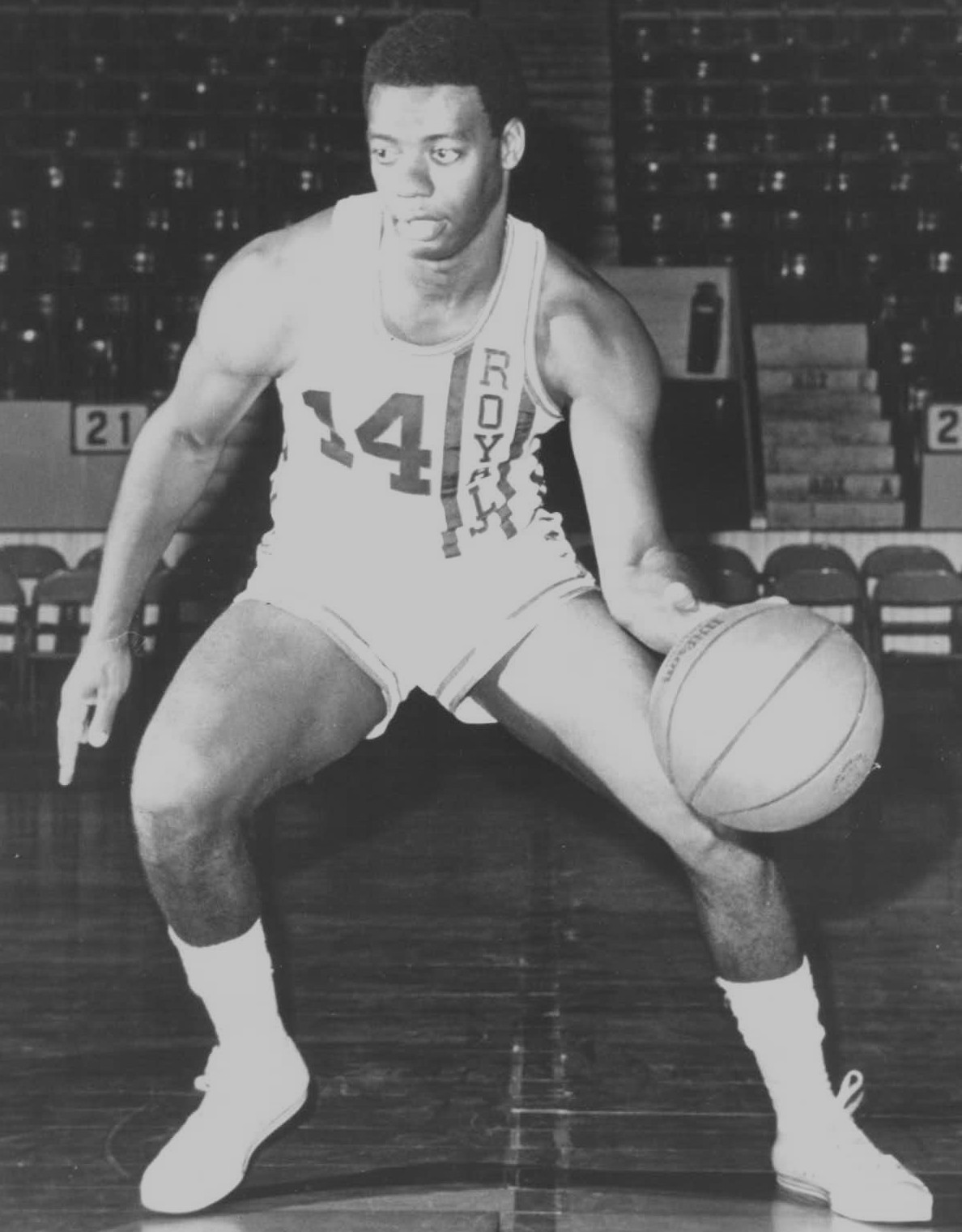
Oscar Robertson is third in NBA career regular season triple-doubles with 181, and was the first of three players to average a triple-double over an entire season.

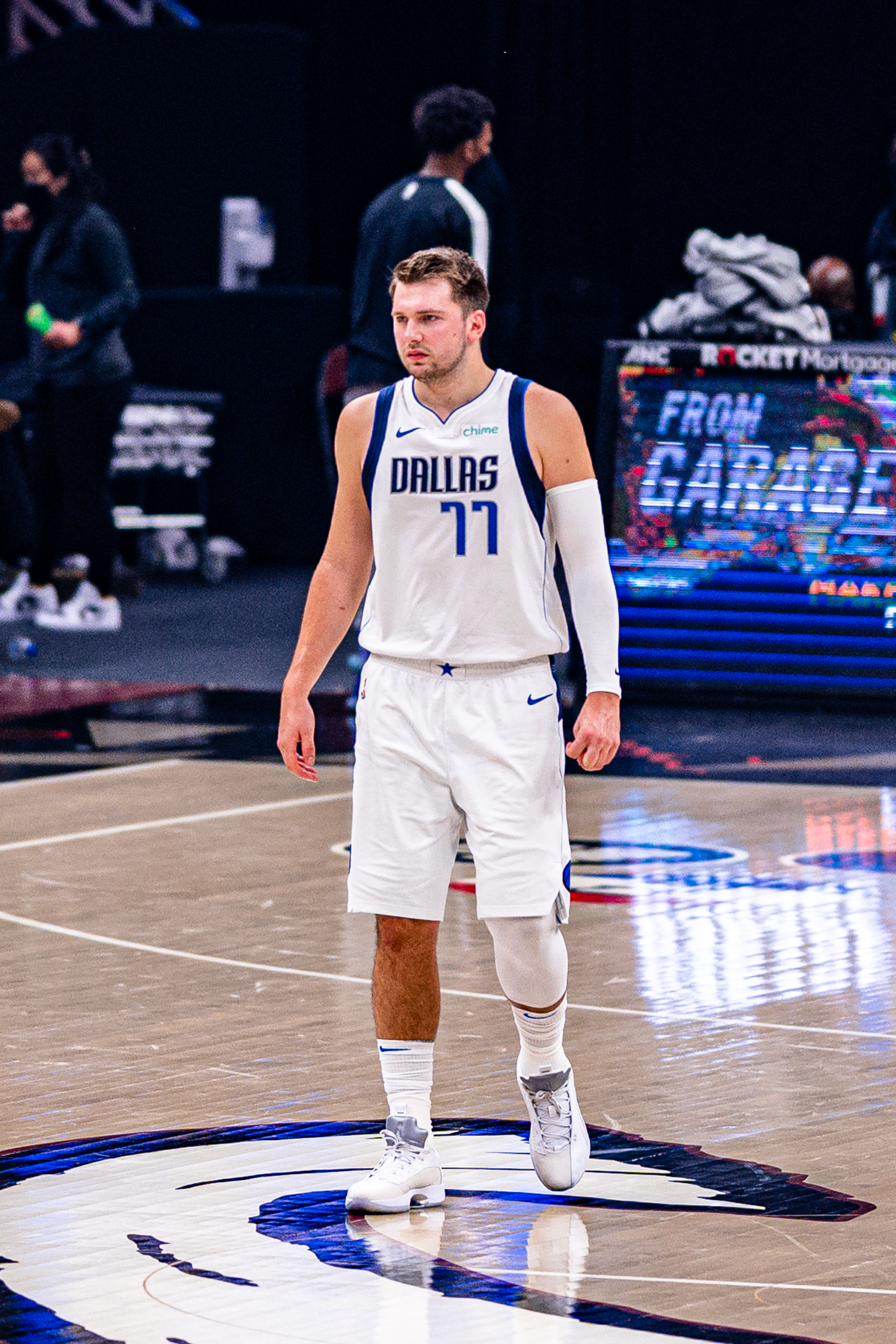
Luka Dončić has the fewest games played of any player in the top ten in NBA career triple-doubles.

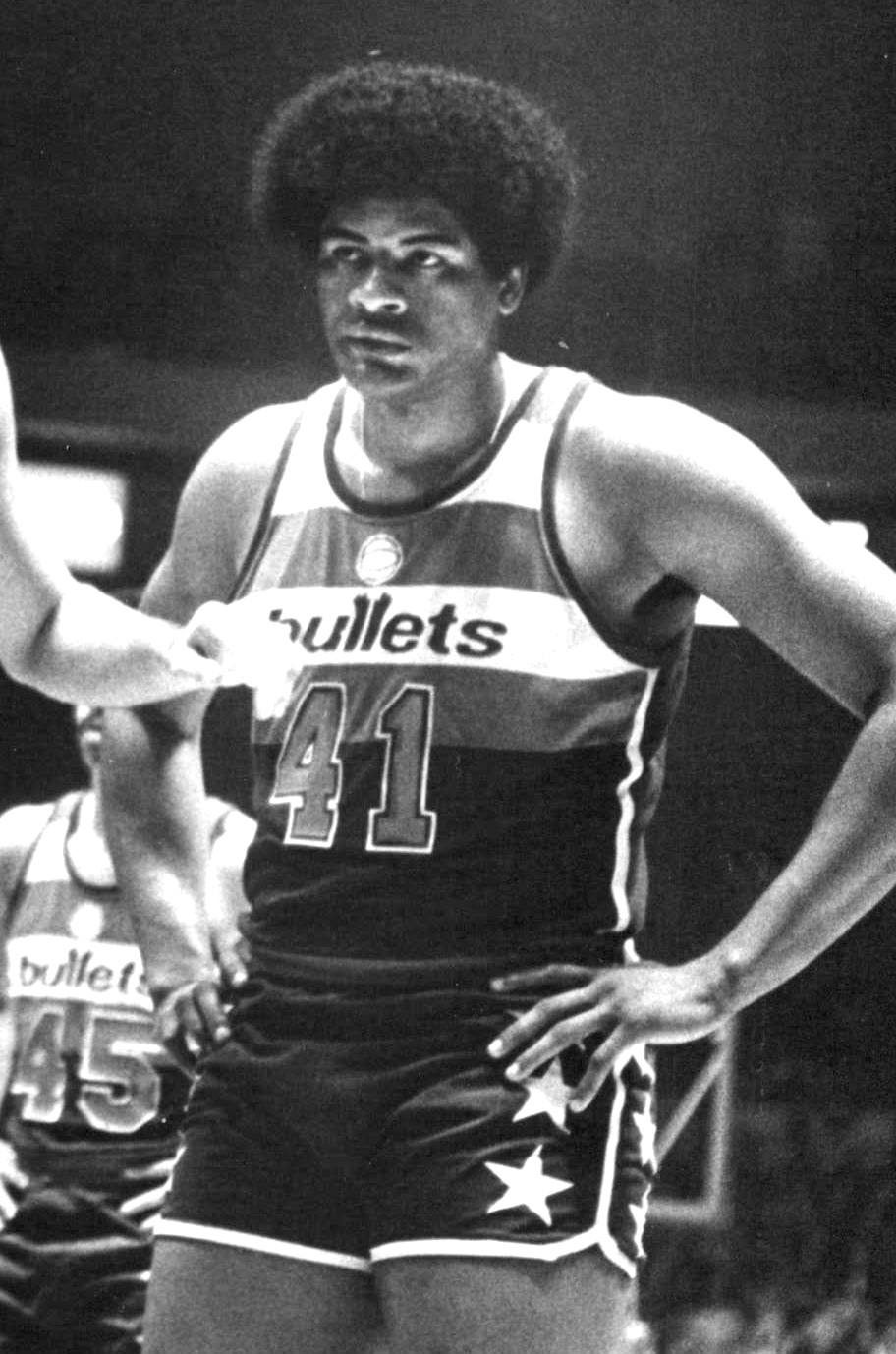
Wes Unseld was the first player to have recorded a perfect triple-double (no missed shots and no missed free throws) in NBA history

- First triple-double in league history: Andy Phillip (Philadelphia Warriors) logged the league's first triple-double on December 14, 1950, versus the Fort Wayne Pistons. He had 17 points, 10 rebounds and 10 assists.
- Averaging a triple-double in a single season: Oscar Robertson, Russell Westbrook and Nikola Jokić are the only players in NBA history to achieve this feat.

*	Led the league

Averaging a triple-double in a season
Name	Team	PPG	RPG	APG	NBA season	Ref.
Oscar Robertson	Cincinnati Royals	30.8	12.5	11.4*	1961–62	
Russell Westbrook	Oklahoma City Thunder	31.6*	10.7	10.4	2016–17	
Russell Westbrook	Oklahoma City Thunder	25.4	10.1	10.3*	2017–18	
Russell Westbrook	Oklahoma City Thunder	22.9	11.1	10.7*	2018–19	
Russell Westbrook	Washington Wizards	22.2	11.5	11.7*	2020–21	
Nikola Jokić	Denver Nuggets	29.6	12.7	10.2	2024–25	
Nikola Jokić	Denver Nuggets	27.7	12.9*	10.7*	2025–26	

- Most triple-doubles in a single season: In 2016–17, Russell Westbrook (Oklahoma City Thunder) recorded 42 triple-doubles.

Most triple-doubles in a single season
Rank	Name	Triple- doubles	Team	NBA season	Per game
1	Russell Westbrook	42	Oklahoma City Thunder	2016–17	0.52
2	Oscar Robertson	41	Cincinnati Royals	1961–62	0.52
3	Russell Westbrook	38	Washington Wizards	2020–21	0.58
4	Russell Westbrook	34	Oklahoma City Thunder	2018–19	0.47
4	Nikola Jokić	34	Denver Nuggets	2024–25	0.49
4	Nikola Jokić	34	Denver Nuggets	2025–26	0.52
7	Wilt Chamberlain	31	Philadelphia 76ers	1967–68	0.38
8	Nikola Jokić	29	Denver Nuggets	2022–23	0.42
9	Oscar Robertson	26	Cincinnati Royals	1960–61	0.37
9	Oscar Robertson	26	Cincinnati Royals	1963–64	0.33
9	Domantas Sabonis	26	Sacramento Kings	2023–24	0.32
12	Russell Westbrook	25	Oklahoma City Thunder	2017–18	0.31
12	Nikola Jokić	25	Denver Nuggets	2023–24	0.32
14	Oscar Robertson	22	Cincinnati Royals	1964–65	0.29
14	Wilt Chamberlain	22	Philadelphia 76ers	1966–67	0.27
14	James Harden	22	Houston Rockets	2016–17	0.27
17	Luka Dončić	21	Dallas Mavericks	2023–24	0.30
18	Oscar Robertson	20	Cincinnati Royals	1962–63	0.25
19	Nikola Jokić	19	Denver Nuggets	2021–22	0.26
20	Magic Johnson	18	Los Angeles Lakers	1981–82	0.23
20	Russell Westbrook	18	Oklahoma City Thunder	2015–16	0.23
20	LeBron James	18	Cleveland Cavaliers	2017–18	0.22

- Most triple-doubles in road games in a single season: Russell Westbrook (Oklahoma City Thunder) recorded 17 of 42 triple-doubles in away games in the 2016–17 NBA season.
- Most 50-point triple-doubles in a single season: Russell Westbrook (Oklahoma City Thunder) recorded three 50-point triple-doubles in the 2016–17 NBA season. James Harden (Houston Rockets) is the other player to record multiple 50-point triple-doubles in the same season, with two in the 2016–17 NBA season and two in the 2018–19 NBA season.
- Most triple-doubles in a rookie season: Oscar Robertson (Cincinnati Royals) recorded 26 triple doubles in the 1960–61 NBA season. Ben Simmons (Philadelphia 76ers) is in second with 12 in the 2017–18 NBA season.
- Oldest player: LeBron James (Los Angeles Lakers), aged 41 years and 90 days, logged a triple-double on March 31, 2026, versus the Washington Wizards. He had 21 points, 10 rebounds and 12 assists.
- Youngest player: Josh Giddey (Oklahoma City Thunder), aged 19 years and 84 days, logged a triple-double on January 2, 2022, versus the Dallas Mavericks. He had 17 points, 13 rebounds and 14 assists.
- Triple-double in final career game: The only players known to have done so are Dwyane Wade, who logged 25 points, 11 rebounds and 10 assists on April 10, 2019, for the Miami Heat against the Brooklyn Nets; Ben Uzoh, who logged 12 points, 11 rebounds and 12 assists on April 26, 2012, for the Toronto Raptors against the New Jersey Nets; and Wilbur Holland, who logged 18 points, 11 rebounds and 11 assists on April 8, 1979, for the Chicago Bulls against the Detroit Pistons.
- Fastest triple-double: Nikola Jokić (Denver Nuggets), holds the record for the fastest triple-double. On February 15, 2018, Nikola Jokić recorded the mark 14 minutes and 33 seconds into the game against the Milwaukee Bucks. The previous fastest triple-double had held for almost 63 years, as on February 20, 1955. Jim Tucker (Syracuse Nationals), in his rookie year, recorded the mark in just 17 minutes, with 12 points, 10 rebounds and 12 assists in a 104–84 win over the New York Knicks.
- Fastest 30-point triple-double: Luka Dončić (Dallas Mavericks) On November 20, 2019, Dončić recorded 35 points, 10 rebounds and 11 assists while playing just 25 minutes and 30 seconds in a 142–94 win against the Golden State Warriors. Dončić has two of the five fastest 30-point triple-doubles in NBA history and the only player to have more than one in 30 minutes or less.
- Double-triple-double (at least 20 of any 3 statistics): Wilt Chamberlain (Philadelphia 76ers), Russell Westbrook (Oklahoma City Thunder), and Nikola Jokić (Denver Nuggets) are the only players to have accomplished this; in a February 2, 1968 game versus Detroit Pistons, Chamberlain tallied 22 points, 25 rebounds and 21 assists. Westbrook recorded 20 points, 20 rebounds and 21 assists against the Los Angeles Lakers on April 2, 2019. Nikola Jokić recorded 31 points, 21 rebounds and 22 assists against the Phoenix Suns on March 7, 2025, also becoming the first player to score at least 30 points while having 20 or more rebounds and 20 or more assists.
- Most points scored in a triple-double: Nikola Jokić (Denver Nuggets) holds the record for most points scored in a triple-double, with 61 points, 10 rebounds and 10 assists in a loss to the Minnesota Timberwolves on April 1, 2025. James Harden (Houston Rockets) and Luka Dončić (Dallas Mavericks) are the only other players to have 60 points in a triple-double, with Harden scoring 60 points, 10 rebounds and 11 assists on January 30, 2018, against the Orlando Magic and Dončić scoring 60 points, 21 rebounds and 10 assists on December 27, 2022, against the New York Knicks.
- Most assists recorded in a triple-double: Isiah Thomas (Detroit Pistons), Rajon Rondo (Boston Celtics), and Russell Westbrook (Oklahoma City Thunder) are tied for the most assists recorded in a triple-double with 24. Isiah Thomas recorded 25 points, 10 rebounds and 24 assists on February 7, 1985, against the Washington Bullets. Rajon Rondo recorded 10 points, 10 rebounds and 24 assists on October 29, 2010, against the New York Knicks. Russell Westbrook achieved this feat twice: 24 points, 13 rebounds and 24 assists on January 10, 2019, against the San Antonio Spurs and 14 points, 21 rebounds and 24 assists on May 3, 2021, against the Indiana Pacers. The latter was also the 3rd game in NBA history with 20+ rebounds and assists; the first two were the triple-20 games mentioned above.
- Most rebounds recorded in a triple-double: Maurice Stokes (Rochester Royals) and Wilt Chamberlain (Philadelphia 76ers) are tied for the most rebounds recorded in a triple-double with 38. Maurice Stokes recorded 26 points, 38 rebounds and 12 assists on January 14, 1956, against the Syracuse Nationals. Wilt Chamberlain achieved this feat twice, recording 24 points, 38 rebounds and 13 assists on March 2, 1967, against the San Francisco Warriors with 10 points, 38 rebounds and 10 assists in a playoff game on April 16, 1967, against the San Francisco Warriors.
- Most steals recorded in a triple-double: Larry Kenon (San Antonio Spurs) and Kendall Gill (New Jersey Nets) share the NBA record for steals in a game with 11 and both have registered a triple-double in doing so. Larry Kenon recorded 29 points, 15 rebounds and 11 steals on December 26, 1976, against the Kansas City Kings and Kendall Gill recorded 15 points, 10 rebounds and 11 steals on April 3, 1999, against the Miami Heat.
- Most blocks recorded in a triple-double: Elmore Smith (Los Angeles Lakers) holds the NBA record for the most blocks in a game with 17, and it was made with a triple-double. He recorded 12 points, 16 rebounds and 17 blocks on October 28, 1973, against the Portland Trail Blazers.
- Triple-double not including points: The only occurrence of a triple-double without points was on February 10, 2017, when Draymond Green (Golden State Warriors) scored only 4 points, but collected 12 rebounds, 10 assists and 10 steals against the Memphis Grizzlies. Green also recorded 5 blocks in the game.
- Longest continuous streak of triple-doubles: Russell Westbrook (Oklahoma City Thunder) currently holds the record for the most consecutive triple-doubles with 11. His streak began on January 22, 2019 and ended February 14 of the same year. The previous record was nine by Wilt Chamberlain from March 8 to 20, 1968, when Chamberlain was a member of the Philadelphia 76ers.
- Longest continuous streak of 30-point triple-doubles: Luka Dončić (Dallas Mavericks) currently holds the record for the most consecutive 30-point triple-doubles with 6. His streak began on February 28, 2024, and it ended on March 9, 2024.
- Triple-doubles by teammates: This has occurred 21 times in NBA history. The following is a list of all NBA teammate triple-doubles. Two pairs of teammates have accomplished this twice: Bam Adebayo and Jimmy Butler and Nikola Jokić and Russell Westbrook; the latter are the first to do so in the same season. Nikola Jokić and Jamal Murray made history on June 7, 2023, by becoming the first pair of teammates to record triple-doubles in the NBA Finals as well as the first pair overall to achieve 30-point triple-doubles in the same game. Stephon Castle and Victor Wembanyama are the first pair of teammates to lose the game in which they achieved the feat. John Konchar and Bez Mbeng are the first pair of teammates to achieve this feat while both coming off the bench.

^	Playoff game
*	Team lost the game

Triple-doubles by teammates
Date	Team	Name 1	Points	Rebounds	Assists	Name 2	Points	Rebounds	Assists	Opponent
January 18, 1962	Cincinnati Royals	Bucky Bockhorn	19	10	12	Oscar Robertson	28	14	16	Philadelphia Warriors
March 14, 1964	Detroit Pistons	Donnie Butcher	19	15	15	Ray Scott	23	20	11	New York Knicks
March 12, 1969	Seattle SuperSonics	Art Harris	14	10	10	Lenny Wilkens	36	14	14	San Diego Rockets
January 22, 1982	Los Angeles Lakers	Kareem Abdul-Jabbar	19	10	10	Magic Johnson	26	16	12	Detroit Pistons
March 29, 1987	Boston Celtics	Larry Bird	17	13	12	Robert Parish	14	10	10	Philadelphia 76ers
January 3, 1989	Chicago Bulls	Michael Jordan	41	11	10	Scottie Pippen	15	12	10	Los Angeles Clippers
April 7, 2007	New Jersey Nets	Vince Carter	46	16	10	Jason Kidd	10	16	18	Washington Wizards
December 15, 2018	Los Angeles Lakers	Lonzo Ball	16	10	10	LeBron James	24	12	11	Charlotte Hornets
February 11, 2019	Oklahoma City Thunder	Paul George	47	12	10	Russell Westbrook	21	14	11	Portland Trail Blazers
May 20, 2019^	Golden State Warriors	Stephen Curry	37	13	11	Draymond Green	18	14	11	Portland Trail Blazers
December 10, 2019	Miami Heat	Bam Adebayo	30	11	11	Jimmy Butler	20	18	10	Atlanta Hawks
August 13, 2020	Memphis Grizzlies	Ja Morant	12	13	10	Jonas Valančiūnas	26	19	12	Milwaukee Bucks
February 18, 2021	Miami Heat	Bam Adebayo	16	12	10	Jimmy Butler	13	10	13	Sacramento Kings
March 3, 2021	Detroit Pistons	Mason Plumlee	14	11	10	Dennis Smith Jr.	10	12	11	Toronto Raptors
December 28, 2021	Los Angeles Lakers	LeBron James	32	11	11	Russell Westbrook	24	12	10	Houston Rockets
June 7, 2023^	Denver Nuggets	Nikola Jokić	32	21	10	Jamal Murray	34	10	10	Miami Heat
December 30, 2024	Denver Nuggets	Nikola Jokić	36	22	11	Russell Westbrook	16	10	10	Utah Jazz
January 10, 2025	Denver Nuggets	Nikola Jokić	35	12	15	Russell Westbrook	25	11	10	Brooklyn Nets
March 25, 2025	New York Knicks	Josh Hart	16	12	11	Karl-Anthony Towns	26	12	11	Dallas Mavericks
November 12, 2025*	San Antonio Spurs	Stephon Castle	23	10	10	Victor Wembanyama	31	15	10	Golden State Warriors
April 11, 2026	Utah Jazz	John Konchar	11	11	10	Bez Mbeng	27	11	11	Memphis Grizzlies

- Triple-doubles by opponents: This has occurred at least 51 times in NBA history. Russell Westbrook has been involved in six of these:
  - Tom Gola and Richie Guerin (Philadelphia at New York, January 10, 1960)
  - Richie Guerin and Guy Rodgers (New York at Philadelphia, February 5, 1961)
  - Oscar Robertson and Richie Guerin (Cincinnati at New York, October 26, 1961)
  - Bob Pettit and Jerry West (St. Louis at Los Angeles, November 8, 1961)
  - Tom Gola and Jerry West (Philadelphia at Los Angeles, December 1, 1961)
  - Wilt Chamberlain and Dave DeBusschere (San Francisco at Detroit, March 5, 1963)
  - Bill Russell and Guy Rodgers (Boston at Chicago, January 17, 1967)
  - Oscar Robertson and Wilt Chamberlain (Cincinnati at Philadelphia, March 19, 1968)
  - Kareem Abdul-Jabbar and Walt Frazier (Milwaukee at New York, April 13, 1970)
  - Oscar Robertson and Sidney Wicks (Milwaukee at Portland, March 24, 1974)
  - Magic Johnson and George McGinnis (Los Angeles at Denver, November 16, 1979)
  - Larry Bird and Micheal Ray Richardson (Boston at New York, March 24, 1981)
  - Magic Johnson and Mychal Thompson (Los Angeles at Portland, April 5, 1983)
  - Magic Johnson and Jeff Ruland (Los Angeles at Washington, February 10, 1984)
  - Jason Kidd and Clyde Drexler (Dallas at Houston, April 11, 1995)
  - Jason Kidd and Clyde Drexler (Phoenix at Houston, March 22, 1997)
  - Gary Payton and Chris Webber (Seattle at Sacramento, April 18, 2000)
  - Jason Kidd and Jay Williams (New Jersey at Chicago, November 9, 2002)
  - Tracy McGrady and Jason Kidd (Orlando at New Jersey, February 23, 2003)
  - Caron Butler and Baron Davis (Washington at Golden State, November 23, 2007)
  - Victor Oladipo and Michael Carter-Williams (Orlando at Philadelphia, December 3, 2013 (2 OT))
    - Oladipo and Carter-Williams were both rookies when accomplishing the feat, marking the first and only time in NBA history that two rookies have recorded triple-doubles in the same game. These were the first career triple-doubles for both players. The last time that two players had recorded their first career triple-doubles in the same game was when Donnie Butcher and Ray Scott (Detroit Pistons) did it on March 14, 1964 (they were not rookies).
  - Russell Westbrook and Giannis Antetokounmpo (Oklahoma City at Milwaukee, March 6, 2016)
  - LeBron James and Stephen Curry (Cleveland at Golden State, June 4, 2017)
  - Nikola Jokić and Giannis Antetokounmpo (Denver at Milwaukee, February 15, 2018)
  - D'Angelo Russell and Kyle Lowry (Brooklyn at Toronto, March 23, 2018)
  - LeBron James and Ben Simmons (Cleveland at Philadelphia, April 6, 2018)
  - Ben Simmons and Giannis Antetokounmpo (Philadelphia at Milwaukee, October 24, 2018)
  - Ben Simmons and Russell Westbrook (Philadelphia at Oklahoma City, February 28, 2019)
  - Elfrid Payton and Luka Dončić (New Orleans at Dallas, March 18, 2019)
  - LeBron James and Luka Dončić (Los Angeles at Dallas, November 1, 2019)
  - Ben Simmons and James Harden (Philadelphia at Houston, January 3, 2020)
  - James Harden and Trae Young (Houston at Atlanta, January 8, 2020)
    - With Harden and Young scoring 41 and 42 points, respectively, this was the first time in NBA history opposing players recorded 40-point triple doubles.
  - Giannis Antetokounmpo and Russell Westbrook (Milwaukee at Washington, March 13, 2021)
  - James Harden and Domantas Sabonis (Brooklyn at Indiana, March 17, 2021)
  - Russell Westbrook and Domantas Sabonis (Washington at Indiana, May 8, 2021)
  - LaMelo Ball and Russell Westbrook (Charlotte at Los Angeles, November 8, 2021)
  - James Harden and Russell Westbrook (Brooklyn at Los Angeles, December 25, 2021)
  - James Harden and Dejounte Murray (Brooklyn at San Antonio, January 21, 2022)
  - Josh Giddey and Julius Randle (Oklahoma City at New York, February 14, 2022)
  - Domantas Sabonis and Giannis Antetokounmpo (Sacramento at Milwaukee, January 14, 2024)
  - Jaylen Brown and Alperen Şengün (Boston at Houston, January 21, 2024)
  - Austin Reaves and Giannis Antetokounmpo (Los Angeles at Milwaukee, March 26, 2024)
  - Domantas Sabonis and LeBron James (Sacramento at Los Angeles, October 26, 2024)
  - Jimmy Butler and Cade Cunningham (Miami at Detroit, December 16, 2024)
  - Domantas Sabonis and Josh Hart (Sacramento at New York, January 25, 2025)
  - LeBron James and Josh Hart (Los Angeles at New York, February 1, 2025)
  - Alperen Şengün and Nikola Jokić (Houston at Denver, December 15, 2025)
  - Paolo Banchero and Nikola Jokić (Orlando at Denver, December 18, 2025)
  - Nikola Jokić and Stephon Castle (Denver at San Antonio, March 12, 2026)
  - Nikola Jokić and Luka Dončić (Denver at Los Angeles, March 14, 2026)
  - John Konchar/Bez Mbeng and Jahmai Mashack (Memphis at Utah, April 11, 2026)
    - Konchar, Mbeng, and Mashack became the first trio to record a triple-double in one game.
  - Jalen Johnson and Josh Giddey (Atlanta at Chicago, November 13, 2026)

== See also ==
- NBA records
- List of NBA career playoff triple-double leaders
