= Be a Nigger Too =

Single by Nas

from the album Untitled (intended)
- Released: April 20, 2008
- Genre: Hip hop
- Length: 3:16
- Label: Def Jam; The Jones Experience
- Songwriters: Nasir Jones; Salaam Gibbs
- Producer: Salaam Remi

Nas singles chronology
"Surviving the Times" (2007)	"Be a Nigger Too" (2008)	"Hero" (2008)

"Be a Nigger Too" is a single released in anticipation of Nas' ninth untitled studio album. Because of sample clearance issues, it is not included on the album. It is produced by Salaam Remi, making it Remi's sixth single production for Nas. The song contains an interpolation of "Niggaz 4 Life" by N.W.A.

== Overview ==
A remix of the track featuring Dante Hawkins was released on a mixtape with DJ Green Lantern The Nigger Tape.

== Music video ==
The music video, directed by Rik Cordero, was recorded in Los Angeles and New York City. It has recently been released online and features cameos from actors of differing ethnicities.

The video, which was not released for television, is based on the monologue scene from the film 25th Hour.

In the beginning of the video Nas' song "Proclamation" from Untitled can be heard.

=== Roles ===
- Andre Royo and Gbenga Akinnagbe of The Wire are both seen in the video as the "nigga".
- John Cho and James Kyson Lee are both seen in the video as the "chink nigga".
- Danny Hoch plays a "kyke nigga".
- Larry Gilliard, Jr. also has a cameo in the video.
