= Surviving the Times =

Single by Nas

from the album Greatest Hits
- Released: November 6, 2007
- Recorded: 2007
- Genre: Hip hop
- Length: 4:43
- Label: Columbia; Sony BMG
- Songwriters: Nasir Jones; Chris Webber
- Producer: Chris Webber

Nas singles chronology
| "Less Than an Hour" (2007) | "Surviving the Times" (2007) | "Be a Nigger Too" (2008) |

"Surviving the Times" is a 2007 hip hop song by Nas from his Greatest Hits album. The song was co-written and produced by Chris Webber. The song's lyrics focus on Nas' career before and just after Illmatic.

The song makes reference to Nas' signing with Columbia Records, being turned down by Russell Simmons for Def Jam, and his meeting Large Professor and Kool G Rap for the first time.

The song also samples Nipsey Russell's song "What Would I Do If I Could Feel" from the musical The Wiz during the intro and chorus. A different version of the song appeared on Nas and DJ Green Lantern's Nigger Tape. It contains the same lyrics but is produced by Cool & Dre.
