= Hero (Nas song) =

Single by Nas featuring Keri Hilson

from the album Untitled
- Released: June 23, 2008
- Recorded: 2008
- Genre: Hip-hop
- Length: 4:00
- Label: The Jones Experience; Def Jam; Columbia
- Songwriters: Nasir Jones; Jamal Jones; Jamaal Sublett; Cornell Haynes
- Producer: Polow da Don

Nas singles chronology
"Be a Nigger Too" (2007)	"Hero" (2008)	"Make the World Go Round" (2008)

Keri Hilson singles chronology
"Scream" (2007)	"Hero" (2008)	"Energy" (2008)

"Hero" is a song by American rapper Nas, released June 2008 as the lead single from his untitled album. The song, which features vocals from American R&B singer Keri Hilson, was produced by Polow da Don.

== Background ==
After claiming that hip hop had died on his previous album, Nas raps on "Hero" about stepping up and bringing it back. The third verse of the song addresses the controversy surrounding the album, originally titled Nigger:

It's Universal apartheid, I'm hogtied, the corporate side
Blocking y'all from goin' to stores and buyin' it
First L.A. [Reid] and Doug Morris was riding with it
But Newsweek article startled bigwigs; they said, "Nas, why is you tryin' it?"
My lawyers only see the Billboard charts as winning
Forgetting, Nas the only true rebel since the beginning
Still in musical prison, in jail for the flow
Try telling Bob Dylan, Bruce [Springsteen], or Billy Joel they can't sing what's in they soul!
So untitled it is
I never changed nothing, but, people, remember this
If Nas can't say it, think about these talented kids
With new ideas, being told what they can and can't spit
I can't sit and watch it, so shit I'ma drop it!
Like it or not, you ain't got to cop it
I'm a hustla in the studio, cups of Don Julio
No matter what the CD called, I'm unbeatable y'all!

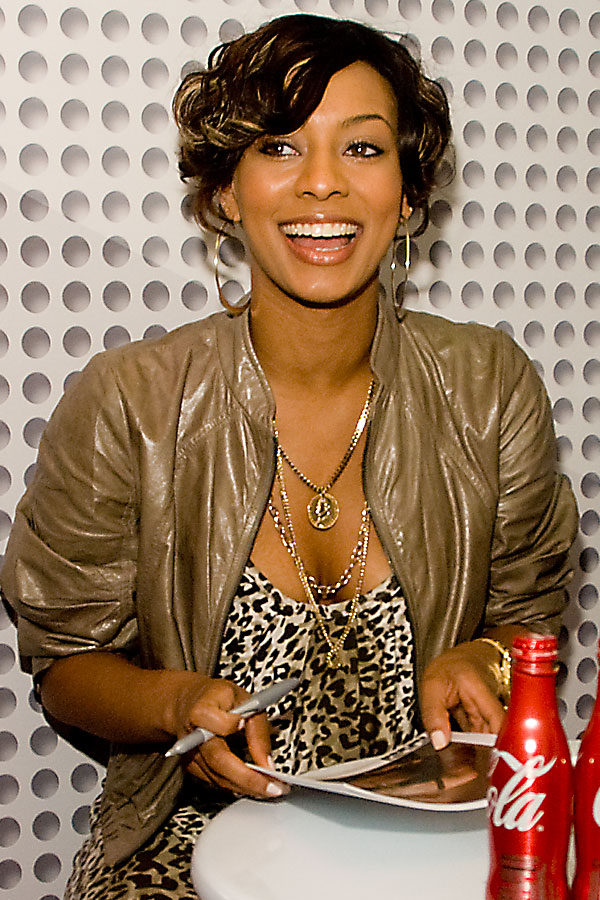
R&B singer-songwriter Keri Hilson sings the song's chorus.

The reference to Doug Morris, then the chairman and CEO of the Universal Music Group, is preserved in the version of "Hero" that appeared on The Nigger Tape, a mixtape released in the run-up to the untitled album's release. In the album version of "Hero," the lyric "Doug Morris" is censored.

== Music video ==
The music video premiered on BET on July 7, 2008. It features the Audi R8. Keri Hilson and Ken Jenkins both make appearances in the video. The video appeared at #63 on BET's Notarized: Top 100 Videos of 2008 countdown. It was directed by Taj Stansberry.

== Track listing ==
CD single

1. "Hero" featuring Keri Hilson (Clean)
2. "Hero" featuring Keri Hilson (Dirty)
3. "Hero" featuring Keri Hilson (Instrumental)

Digital download

1. "Hero (feat. Keri Hilson)"

== Charts ==
Chart (2008)	Peak position
Canada Hot 100 (Billboard)	60
Switzerland (Schweizer Hitparade)	70
UK Singles (Official Charts)	70
US Billboard Hot 100	97
US Hot R&B/Hip-Hop Songs (Billboard)	82
