= Chris Webber =

American basketball player (born 1973)

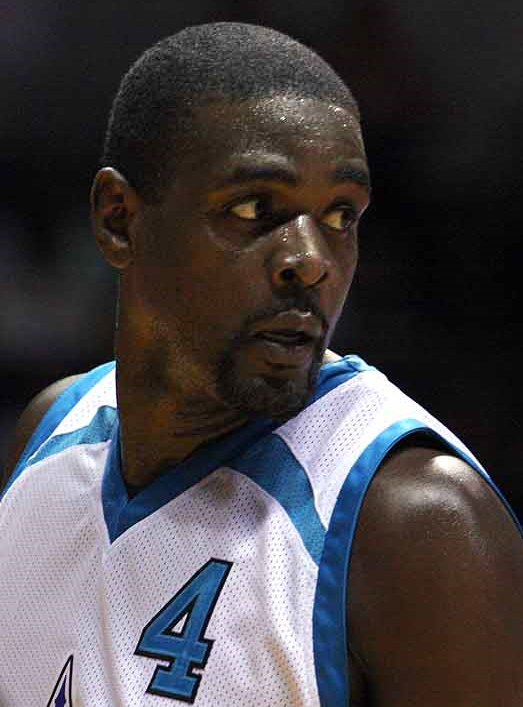
- Webber in 2010

Personal information
- Born: March 1, 1973 (age 53) Detroit, Michigan, U.S.
- Listed height: 6 ft 10 in (2.08 m)
- Listed weight: 245 lb (111 kg)

Career information
- High school: Detroit Country Day (Beverly Hills, Michigan)
- College: Michigan (1991–1993)
- NBA draft: 1993: 1st round, 1st overall pick
- Drafted by: Orlando Magic
- Playing career: 1993–2008
- Position: Power forward / center
- Number: 4, 2, 84

Career history
- 1993–1994: Golden State Warriors
- 1994–1998: Washington Bullets / Wizards
- 1998–2005: Sacramento Kings
- 2005–2007: Philadelphia 76ers
- 2007: Detroit Pistons
- 2008: Golden State Warriors

Career highlights
- 5× NBA All-Star (1997, 2000–2003); All-NBA First Team (2001); 3× All-NBA Second Team (1999, 2002, 2003); All-NBA Third Team (2000); NBA Rookie of the Year (1994); NBA All-Rookie First Team (1994); NBA rebounding leader (1999); No. 4 retired by Sacramento Kings; Consensus first-team All-American (1993); USBWA National Freshman of the Year (1992); Big Ten Freshman of the Year (1992); National high school player of the year (1991); 2× First-team Parade All-American (1990, 1991); McDonald's All-American Co-MVP (1991); Mr. Basketball of Michigan (1991)

Career NBA statistics
- Points: 17,182 (20.7 ppg)
- Rebounds: 8,124 (9.8 rpg)
- Assists: 3,526 (4.2 apg)
- Stats at NBA.com
- Stats at Basketball Reference
- Basketball Hall of Fame

Mayce Edward Christopher Webber III (born March 1, 1973), nicknamed "C-Webb", is an American former professional basketball player. Webber played 15 seasons in the National Basketball Association (NBA), with the largest portion of his career spent with the Sacramento Kings. Drafted number one overall in the 1993 NBA draft, Webber became a five-time NBA All-Star, a five-time All-NBA Team member, and the NBA Rookie of the Year. He also played for the Golden State Warriors, Washington Bullets, Philadelphia 76ers, and Detroit Pistons during his NBA career.

Webber was a National High School Basketball Player of the Year who led his high school to three Michigan State High School Basketball Championships. As a collegiate athlete, he was a first-team All-American and led the Michigan Wolverines' 1991 incoming freshman class known as the Fab Five that reached the 1992 and 1993 NCAA Men's Division I Basketball Championship games as freshmen and sophomores. However, Webber was indicted by a federal grand jury and stripped of his All-American honors by the NCAA as a result of his direct involvement in a scandal involving payments from boosters to players.

Webber is an on-air commentator for NBA games and has taught at Wake Forest University and Morehouse College. He was inducted into the Naismith Basketball Hall of Fame in 2021.

== High school career ==
Webber attended Detroit Country Day School from 1987 to 1991 and at the time was the most recruited Michigan high school basketball player since Magic Johnson. Webber led Country Day to three MHSAA State championships. As a senior in high school Webber averaged 29.4 points and 13 rebounds per game. He was named Mr. Basketball of Michigan and the 1990–1991 National High School player of the year. He was named MVP in both the McDonald's and Dapper Dan All-Star games.

== College career ==
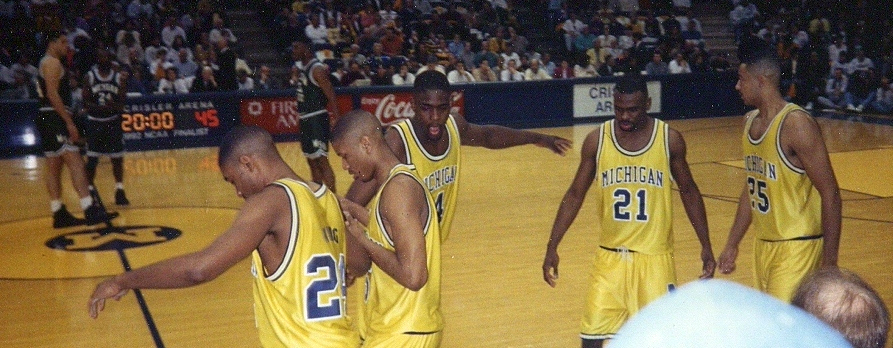
Michigan's Fab Five (left to right) Jimmy King, Jalen Rose, Webber, Ray Jackson and Juwan Howard

After graduating from Detroit Country Day School, Webber attended the University of Michigan for two years. While a Michigan Wolverine, Webber led the group of players known as the Fab Five, which included himself, Juwan Howard, Jalen Rose, Jimmy King, and Ray Jackson. This group, all of whom entered Michigan as freshmen in the fall of 1991, took the basketball team to the NCAA finals twice, losing both times. The Fab Five, sporting long, baggy shorts and black socks, became immensely popular as they were seen as bringing a hip hop flavor to the game. Four of the Fab Five (Webber, Rose, Howard, and King) made it to the NBA. In their first season, the Fab Five led Michigan to an NCAA championship game against Duke, becoming the first team in NCAA history to compete in the championship with freshmen as all five starters.

On April 5, 1993, at Michigan's second consecutive appearance at the NCAA Men's Division I Basketball Championship game with 11 seconds remaining, Webber brought the ball up the court into a half court trap. Michigan was down 73–71. Webber attempted to call for a timeout while his team had none remaining, resulting in a technical foul that effectively clinched the game for North Carolina. Webber continues to receive ridicule for his time-out error; when he joined Inside the NBA in 2008, part of the humorous initiation ceremony was the question "In college basketball how many timeouts do you get in a game?" (Webber replied, "I still don't know the answer!") His father has a license plate that says timeout. The error was later referenced in the 2018 sports comedy film Uncle Drew, in which Webber played the role of Preacher.

The game marked the end of Webber's acclaimed two-year collegiate basketball career. In his second season, he was a first team All-American selection and a finalist for the John R. Wooden Award and Naismith College Player of the Year. These awards and honors have been vacated due to NCAA sanctions related to Webber's eligibility in the University of Michigan basketball scandal. In that scandal, Webber received over $200,000 from a local booster while playing basketball for Michigan. Webber was deemed to be an ineligible player by the NCAA, convicted of perjury and banned from any affiliation with the Michigan program until 2013.

Despite the ban, Webber attended the 2013 NCAA Men's Division I Basketball Championship game between Michigan and Louisville. He apparently watched the game from a private suite, rather than in the grandstands near courtside, where the other members of the Fab Five watched the game together. Webber posted on Twitter before the game: "I'm here at the Georgia Dome to show my support for the Michigan men's basketball team in its quest for a National Championship. I've known some of the players on the team since they were kids and I am excited for them and all of the student athletes on the court tonight who are wearing the Michigan uniform. It has been a great season and I wish them all the best."

=== University of Michigan basketball scandal ===
In 2002, Webber was charged for lying to a grand jury as part of a larger investigation of a numbers gambling operation, run by Michigan basketball program booster Ed Martin, in Ford Motor Company plants in the Detroit area. The investigation, originally focused on the numbers operation and tax evasion, soon widened to include the University of Michigan basketball program. Martin was convicted on counts of tax evasion and robbery and was scheduled to testify on the financial connections between himself and Webber at a sentencing hearing, but died of a heart attack before the hearing.

As a result of evidence admitted during the course of Martin's trial, Webber pleaded guilty to one count of criminal contempt for lying about his role in a scandal in which four players, including himself, had accepted illicit loans from Martin. Martin had been giving money to Webber since the 8th grade. He admitted in the plea that in 1994 he gave Martin about $38,000 in cash as partial repayment for expenditures Martin made on his behalf. He was ordered to pay $100,000 and perform 330 hours of community service.

Due to concerns that Webber's amateur status had been compromised, Michigan forfeited its victory in the 1992 Final Four over Cincinnati, as well as its runner-up status in the 1992 tourney. Michigan also forfeited the entire 1992–93 season, removed the 1992 and 1993 Final Four banners from the Crisler Arena rafters, and deleted Webber's records from its record book. The NCAA also ordered Michigan to disassociate itself from Webber until 2013. Webber later called Michigan's decision "hurtful" because he and his Fab Five teammates "gave everything to Michigan" while they played there.

After Webber's plea, the Michigan State High School Athletic Association (MHSAA) recommended that Detroit Country Day forfeit all games in which Webber appeared (including three state championships), since according to his own admission, Webber had been accepting money from Martin since junior high school. The school conducted its own investigation, and called a press conference to announce it had found "no credible evidence" that Webber had accepted "substantial" amounts of cash from Martin while in high school, and therefore refused to forfeit any games. The MHSAA claimed it had no legal authority to force the games to be forfeited.

Webber was suspended by the NBA for a total of eight games—five for an unnamed violation of the league substance abuse policies and three for lying to the grand jury. Webber received the suspensions once he recovered from an injury that kept him out for half of the 2003–04 season.

The scandal was explored in a documentary by ESPN Films called The Fab Five, which aired in March 2011. In it, the University of Michigan repeated its position that it would not associate with Webber until he publicly apologized for his part in the Ed Martin scandal, with the self-imposed 10-year ban on its association with the remainder of the players ending in 2013. Webber declined to participate in the documentary.

Webber made his first post-ban public appearance at the University of Michigan on November 3, 2018, when he was invited by football coach Jim Harbaugh to participate as an honorary captain for its game against Penn State; Webber was warmly received at Michigan Stadium. Of the experience, Webber said on NBA TV, "Tell you what, fellas, this was a great moment, in front of 100,000 people. I had goosebumps and chills, and definitely some watery eyes." Webber also spent time with the football program as its guest before the game. He did not meet with the Michigan basketball team or staff, but despite this, head coach John Beilein stated that "I think it was a great step in the right direction that he was here." After Juwan Howard, teammate of Webber from the Fab Five, took over as head coach in 2019, Webber indicated to TMZ that he is open to reconciling with Michigan basketball and said, "Howard is my friend.... and therefore, I put pride aside", but wants his return to the Crisler Arena to be private.

== Professional career ==
=== Golden State Warriors (1993–1994) ===
Webber was selected by the Orlando Magic with the first pick of the 1993 NBA draft, becoming the first sophomore since Magic Johnson to be a No. 1 overall draft pick. The Magic immediately traded him to the Golden State Warriors in exchange for Penny Hardaway and three future first round draft picks. Over his 15-year NBA career, Webber made $178 million.

Webber had an outstanding first year, averaging 17.5 points and 9.1 rebounds per game and winning the NBA Rookie of the Year Award. He was instrumental in leading the Warriors back into the playoffs where they were swept by the Charles Barkley-led Phoenix Suns in three games. However, he had a long-standing conflict with his coach, Don Nelson. Nelson wanted to make Webber primarily a post player, despite Webber's superb passing ability and good ball handling skills for someone his size at 6 ft 10 in (2.08 m) tall. Webber also disliked playing a substantial amount of time at center, given Nelson's propensity towards smaller, faster line ups. In the 1994 off-season, the Warriors acquired Rony Seikaly so that Webber could play primarily at power forward. However, at the time, the differences between Webber and Nelson were considered to be irreconcilable. Webber exercised a one-year escape clause in his contract, stating he had no intention of returning to the Warriors. With few alternatives, Golden State agreed to a sign-and-trade deal, sending Webber to the Washington Bullets (renamed the Wizards in 1997) for forward Tom Gugliotta and three first-round draft picks. The three draft picks included two of the picks the Warriors had traded to the Magic to obtain Webber in the first place, as the Magic had included those picks in a trade package with the Bullets less than 4 months earlier.

=== Washington Bullets / Wizards (1994–1998) ===
With the Washington Bullets, Webber was reunited with his college teammate and friend, Juwan Howard. Initially, Webber wore the #2 with the Bullets because Scott Skiles wore his preferred #4. Webber would switch to his familiar #4 after Skiles left in the 1995 off-season. On December 27, 1995, Webber recorded a triple double with a then-career-high 40 points, 10 rebounds, and 10 assists during a win over the Warriors. In the 1995–96 season injuries limited Webber to only 15 games. He rebounded the following year and averaged 20.1 points, 10.3 rebounds, and 4.6 assists per game, and was named to the 1997 All-Star team, the first all-star game appearance of his career. The same season, Webber led the Bullets into the playoffs for the first time in nine years, but they were swept by the Michael Jordan-led Chicago Bulls in three games. By 1998, Webber had established himself as a great power forward, but his time in Washington had also worn out.

=== Sacramento Kings (1998–2005) ===
On May 14, 1998, Webber was traded to the Sacramento Kings for Mitch Richmond and Otis Thorpe. Although Webber originally did not want to go to the Kings, as they were a perennially losing team, he had his best years in Sacramento and nearly took the team to the NBA Finals.

When Webber arrived, the Kings also signed small forward Peja Stojaković and center Vlade Divac, and drafted point guard Jason Williams. In his first year with the Kings (the lockout-shortened 1998–99 season), Webber won the rebounding title averaging a league high 13.0 rebounds per game, ending Dennis Rodman's seven-year run as the NBA's rebound leader. Under the guidance of Rick Adelman, the Kings team made it into the 1999 Playoffs, where they lost to the Utah Jazz led by future hall of famers Karl Malone and John Stockton.

In years to come, Webber and the Kings became one of the league's top franchises, and NBA title contenders. He was named to the All-Star team again in 2000 and 2001 while cementing his status as one of the premier power forwards in the NBA. For the 1999–2000 season Webber was the cover athlete on NBA Jam 2000; that season, Webber led the Kings to 44 wins improving their win column from a year before, and into the first round of the 2000 Playoffs where they faced the Los Angeles Lakers. After losing the first two games of the series in Los Angeles, the Kings won the next two in Sacramento, including 23 points, 14 rebounds, 7 blocks, 8 assists and 4 steals from Webber in game four, to send the series back to Los Angeles for a deciding game 5. The Kings lost Game 5 and the series to the Lakers who went on to win the championship that year.

Webber peaked in the 2000–01 season, when he averaged a career-high 27.1 points. He also averaged 11.1 rebounds and was fourth in MVP voting, while starting at forward for the Western Conference All-Star Team in the 2001 All-Star Game in Washington. In the 2001 Playoffs, Webber and the Kings defeated the Phoenix Suns in four games of the first round to advance to the second round (first time of his career he advanced past the first round), where they faced the Los Angeles Lakers for a second year in a row. The Kings lost in four games to the Lakers despite Webber's 21 points, 11 rebounds and 8 assists in game four.

On July 27, 2001, Webber signed a seven-year, $127 million contract with the Kings. In the 2001–02 season, Webber played in 54 games leading the Kings to a Pacific division title and a franchise-record (and league-best) 61–21 season. He also made his fourth All-Star team and the All-NBA Second Team. In the 2002 Playoffs the Kings defeated the Utah Jazz in four games and Dallas Mavericks in five games in the first two rounds en route to reaching the Western Conference Finals against their archrivals, the defending-champion Los Angeles Lakers led by Kobe Bryant and Shaquille O'Neal, a series that would prove to be one of the most memorable (and most controversial) in NBA History.

The series was nip and tuck all the way as both teams traded wins in the first six games of the series as the Lakers won games one, four (highlighted by the game winner from Robert Horry) and six, a game which featured many controversial calls, including a late-game foul on Mike Bibby after he was bleeding from being elbowed in the nose by Bryant. All told, the Lakers shot 27 free throws in the fourth quarter. Former NBA referee Tim Donaghy filed in court papers in 2008 said that Game 6 was fixed by the NBA. NBA Commissioner David Stern denied Donaghy's allegations. Lawrence Pedowitz, who led a review of the league's officiating following the outbreak of the scandal, concluded that while Game 6 was poorly officiated, no concrete evidence existed of it having been fixed.

The Kings won games two, three and five, including 29 points, 13 rebounds and 3 assists from Webber plus the game-winner from teammate Mike Bibby in game five, heading into the deciding seventh game back at the ARCO Arena in Sacramento, a game which would prove to be most memorable of the series. The game was nip and tuck all the way with Webber recording 20 points, 11 assists, 8 rebounds, 2 blocks and 1 steal and Bryant and O'Neal recording 30 points, 10 rebounds, 7 assists and 2 steals, with 35 points, 13 rebounds, 4 blocks and 2 assists, respectively, as the game went into overtime with missed shots from teammates Stojakovic and Doug Christie, boiling to the last minutes of the game with Webber fouling O'Neal with 1:27 left in overtime causing O'Neal to make both free throws and the Kings would go on to lose Game 7 of the series at home. It was the closest that Webber ever got to a championship.

In the next season, Webber averaged 23 points and 11 rebounds per game. He was cited as a possible MVP candidate, and made his fifth consecutive All-Star team. In a bad sign of what was to come, Webber missed the All Star game with a sprained ankle. Nevertheless, he returned and the Kings were among the favorites to win the NBA Championship. In the second game of the 2003 Western Conference Semifinals against the Dallas Mavericks, Webber suffered a career-threatening knee injury while making a back-cut, forcing him to miss nearly a year of action. This shattered the Kings' 2003 title hopes and they lost the series in seven games.

After microfracture surgery, he returned for the final 24 games of the 2003–04 season, in which he led the Kings (who went 55–27 that season) into the 2004 Playoffs where they faced their archrivals the Dallas Mavericks for the third year in a row, the Kings defeated the Mavericks in five games in the first round en route to reaching the Western Conference Semifinals against the top-seeded Minnesota Timberwolves led by league MVP Kevin Garnett, a series that would prove to be one of the most memorable in NBA history. Each game was neck and neck with both teams trading wins in the first six games of the series as the Timberwolves won games two, three and five, while the Kings won games one, four and six, including 28 points, 8 rebounds, 1 assist, 3 steals and 1 block from Webber in game four, heading into the deciding seventh game back at the Target Center in Minnesota, a game which would prove to be the most memorable of the series.

The game was indecisively close throughout the first three quarters, with Webber recording 16 points, 8 rebounds, 4 assists and 1 steal, and Garnett on the other hand recording 32 points, 21 rebounds, 2 assists, 4 steals and 5 blocks. The game boiled down to the last play of the game with the Kings trailing the Timberwolves by 3 with 2.5 seconds left in the game. After receiving an inbounds pass Webber pump-faked Garnett in the air and got a clean look as Garnett avoided contact for a three-point shot that rimmed out as the final buzzer sounded and the Kings lost Game 7 and the series, marking the third year in a row that the Kings lost a deciding game 7. It turned out to be the last chance the Webber-led Kings had to win a championship and he was traded the following season, thus resulting in the team being dismantled the following season.

=== Philadelphia 76ers (2005–2007) ===
In February 2005, Webber was traded, along with Michael Bradley and Matt Barnes, to the Philadelphia 76ers for power forward Kenny Thomas, forward/center Brian Skinner, and former King Corliss Williamson. Webber took some time to fit in with the 76ers' system, which was geared toward star guard Allen Iverson. While the Sixers reached the 2005 playoffs, they lost to the Detroit Pistons. In the 21 games he played for Philadelphia in 2005, Webber averaged 15.6 points and 7.9 rebounds per game on 39.1% shooting. Following the 2003 microfracture surgery on his knee, Webber had lost lateral quickness and was seen as a defensive liability.

In 2006, Webber put up a resurgent 20 points and 9.9 rebounds per game in 75 games for Philadelphia. Nevertheless, the team missed the playoffs, finishing with a 38–44 record. On Tuesday, April 18, 2006, Webber and Iverson were fined for not showing up at the Philadelphia 76ers' final home game of the season, which was Fan Appreciation Night, although both of them were injured and not expected to play. The following day, they both apologized for being absent.

In the 2006–2007 season, Webber's role was reduced, and he was benched in the fourth quarter of multiple games. In November 2006, ESPN reported that "Webber's minutes and production had "dramatically declined", and that coach Maurice Cheeks had "turned him into a $20 million role player". Webber discussed his frustration with team president Billy King, but claimed he was not requesting a trade. During the 2006–07 season, Webber only played 18 of 35 games for the Sixers, leading the media to question his motivation. On January 11, 2007, King announced that the Sixers and Webber had agreed to a reported $25 million contract buyout on the remaining two years left on his contract, in effect paying him not to play. Later that day, the Sixers waived Webber, making him a free agent.

=== Detroit Pistons (2007) ===
On January 16, 2007, Webber signed with the Detroit Pistons. He has stated throughout his career that he always wanted to play for his hometown team. His usual number 4 had been retired in honor of Joe Dumars, so Webber donned the number 84, because his nephew had a dream of him making a buzzer beater with that number on. The Pistons were a much improved basketball team after Webber's acquisition, improving their record in the Eastern Conference and solidifying the first seed in the East. However, the Eastern Conference favorites failed to advance to the finals after losing to the Cleveland Cavaliers in six games in the Eastern Conference Finals, leaving Webber short of an NBA Finals appearance yet again. Indeed, Webber performed well in the 2007 Playoffs despite receiving limited minutes. Webber still managed to average 10 points and 6 rebounds per game in the playoffs and shot an impressive 52.4% from the field. His efforts were highlighted by a game 5 performance in the Eastern Conference Finals in which Webber scored 20 points (including 5 points in the double-overtime period) on 9 of 13 shooting and grabbed 7 boards. Nevertheless, Detroit still lost what turned out to be the key game in the series in double overtime and Webber ended up averaging a career low 11.2 PPG in his run with the Pistons. During the off-season, Detroit did not re-sign Webber. Despite receiving a lucrative proposal from Olympiacos B.C. in Greece, he was in free agency at the beginning of the regular season.

=== Return to Golden State (2008) ===
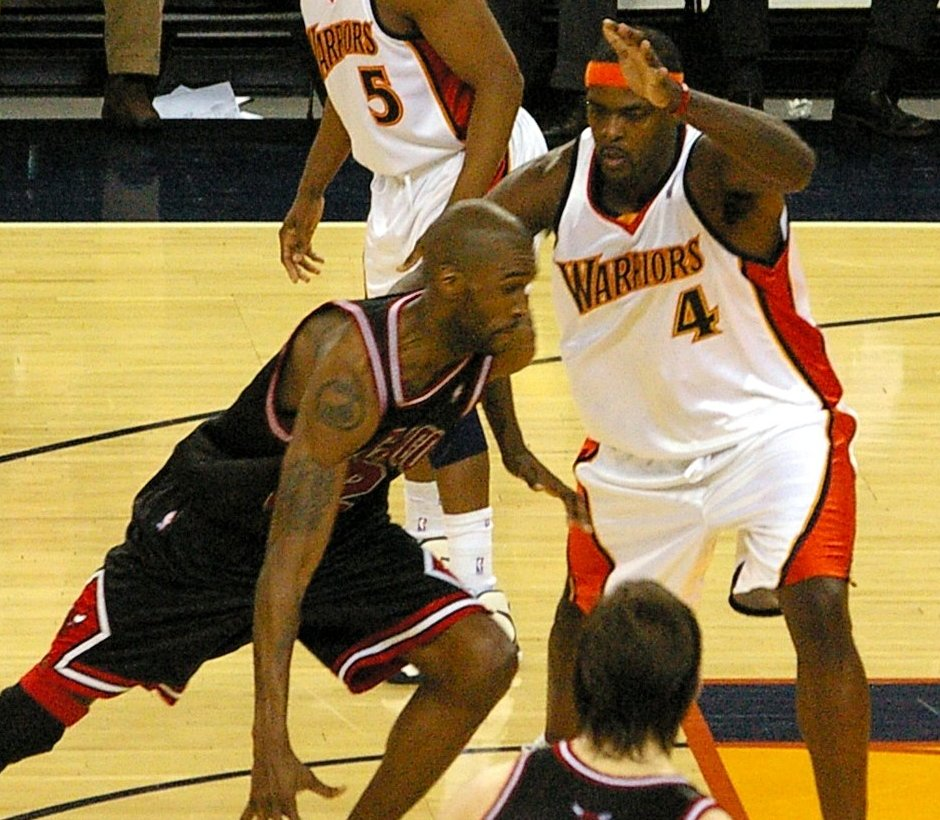
Webber (right) playing for the Warriors in 2008

On January 29, 2008, the Golden State Warriors signed Webber for the rest of the season. Terms of the deal were not disclosed, but the San Francisco Chronicle reported that he would receive the pro-rated veteran's minimum of $1.2 million (approximately $570,000). This came after a rejected offer by the Los Angeles Lakers who were trying to coax Webber in with two 10-day contracts so they could decide afterwards if they wanted him the rest of the season. This also put to rest talks of joining the Detroit Pistons, Dallas Mavericks, or retirement. He played in only nine games for the Warriors, averaging 3.9 points and 3.6 rebounds in 14 minutes per game.

On March 25, 2008, Webber retired from basketball due to persistent problems with his surgically repaired knee and was waived by the Warriors. On March 27, 2008, Webber made his first appearance on television on Inside the NBA on TNT, alongside Charles Barkley and host Ernie Johnson. On April 25, 2008, TNT offered Webber a job to be a commentator for the postseason.

On February 6, 2009, Webber returned to ARCO Arena, home of the Sacramento Kings, to participate in the ceremonies surrounding the retirement of his jersey, #4.

== Legacy ==
Webber ranked #64 in SLAM Magazine's Top 75 NBA players of all time in 2003 and ranked #11 in an ESPN.com experts poll of the top power forwards of all time in 2005. He also ranked #72 on a list of the Top 96 NBA players of all time in Bill Simmons' 2009 bestseller The Book of Basketball: The NBA According to the Sports Guy. In 2021, to commemorate the NBA's 75th Anniversary The Athletic ranked their top 75 players of all time, and named Webber as the 65th greatest player in NBA history.

The Sacramento Kings retired Webber's number 4 jersey on February 6, 2009, when the Kings hosted the Utah Jazz.

Webber was inducted to the Naismith Memorial Basketball Hall of Fame in 2021.

Webber's youngest brother, David, matched his total with 3 Michigan High School Athletic Association state championships (1995–97), and became Mid-American Conference Men's Basketball Player of the Year.

== Post-basketball life ==
Since retiring from the NBA, Webber became an analyst on NBA TV's NBA Gametime Live. He did the Tuesday Fan Night alongside Ernie Johnson and Kevin McHale. He also served as an occasional guest analyst (primary) on TNT's Inside the NBA from 2008 to 2021. During Charles Barkley's leave of absence, Webber substituted for him along with other guests such as Gary Payton and Mike Fratello. Since 2017, he was also a regular panelist during NBA on TNT's Monday coverage called Players Only, which features only former NBA players as studio analysts, play-by-play announcers, and color analysts for games. In 2021, Webber parted ways with TNT on the eve of the NBA playoffs. Webber has expressed interest in eventually becoming a GM and owner. In 2025, Webber returned to TNT Sports as a college basketball analyst and is scheduled to feature on the network's coverage of the Players Era Festival tournament in Las Vegas in November.

In August 2010, Webber played in the NBA Asia Challenge 2010 at Araneta Coliseum in Metro Manila, an exhibition game which pitted NBA legends and NBA Development League players against Philippine Basketball Association stars and legends.

Webber was the owner of Center Court With C-Webb, a restaurant in Sacramento, California. Opening in 2006, the restaurant closed on November 17, 2009 falling victim to the Great Recession.

Earlier that year, Webber married his longtime girlfriend Erika Dates during a private ceremony at his Atlanta home. In attendance were 200 guests including family and close friends.

In 2015, Chris Webber was the executive producer for the independent romantic-drama film Somewhere in the Middle by Lanre Olabisi. Webber has also tried his hand at music production, producing Nas's tracks "Surviving the Times" from his Greatest Hits album and "Blunt Ashes" from Hip Hop Is Dead.

In late 2016, Webber began hosting Fearless or Insane on Podcast One. In 2018, with old age makeup, he played the role of Preacher in the film Uncle Drew, which starred Kyrie Irving.

In 2016, Webber began work as a professor of practice at Wake Forest University, teaching a class in sports storytelling. In 2021 he began teaching at Morehouse College, instructing an online course on athlete activism.

In 2021 Webber announced the launch of a private equity fund for investing in minority-owned cannabis businesses. He stated: "It's crucial that we diversify leadership within the cannabis industry and level the playing field for people from our communities. For far too long, minorities have been excessively punished and incarcerated for cannabis while others profited." In 2022 he announced the launch of "Players Only", a cannabis brand that will feature flower strains, cartridges, pre-rolls, vapes, sport recovery and performance products, apparel, and more.

== Personal life ==
=== African-American artifacts ===
Webber has a personal collection of African-American artifacts which he began collecting in 1994. He began collecting them upon entering the NBA, starting with the purchase of two slave records. Webber believes that these artifacts are a reflection of his beliefs and aspirations. He initially collected them as encouragements to face life obstacles. However, he had no intentions on exhibiting them until the growth of his collection prompted additional storage. His collection includes an original 1901 publication of an autobiography by Booker T. Washington, and various documents, letters, and postcards signed by Frederick Douglass, Martin Luther King Jr., and Malcolm X. When not on public exhibit, the artifacts are stored at the Sacramento Public Library's Archival Vault. In previous years, the Chris Webber Collection has been featured in Crocker Art Museum and Wayne State University.

On June 28, 2007, Webber unveiled his collection of African-American artifacts during the Celebrating Heritage Exhibition at Charles H. Wright Museum of African American History in Detroit. During a news conference, Webber said he believed that children can learn from these artifacts, "Hopefully, when children see them they will see there is no excuse for us not to be successful. There's no excuse not to find something that you love to do. There's no excuse to not work hard at it."

=== Charity ===
Webber is active in various charities and created The Timeout Foundation in 1993. The foundation's mission is to provide positive educational and recreational opportunities to youth.

In 1999, Webber created C-Webb's Crew where a group of tickets at every Kings regular home season game would be donated to at-risk youth and their families. To date, over 3,000 youths and their families have attended a game through C-Webb's Crew.

Community awards Webber has won include the inaugural Sacramento Kings/Oscar Robertson Triple Double Award, which is annually awarded to a Kings player who exemplifies: team leadership, all-around game, and sportsmanship; the NBA Community Assist Award for his contributions in February 2003, and the Wish Maker of the Year in 2003 awarded by the Sacramento Chapter of the Make a Wish Foundation.

Webber held a celebrity weekend, Bada Bling!, at the Caesars Palace Hotel in Las Vegas. The event was held from July 28–30, 2006, and included a live auction and celebrity poker tournament. Many renowned NBA players participated including then-current and former teammates: Mike Bibby, Brad Miller, Andre Iguodala, Bobby Jackson, Kyle Korver, and his then-current coach, Maurice Cheeks. Other notable participants included Charles Barkley, Kareem Abdul-Jabbar, Gary Payton, Kenny Smith, Moses Malone, and Stephon Marbury. Numerous entertainers attended as well such as Nas and Common. All of the proceeds were donated to The Timeout Foundation.

Webber hosted his 2nd annual Bada Bling charity weekend from July 20–22, 2007, at Caesar's Palace in Las Vegas.

=== Legal issues ===
In 1998, Webber was arrested and charged with second-degree assault, resisting arrest, possession of marijuana, driving under the influence of marijuana and five other traffic-related violations after being pulled over for speeding on the way to the practice center at the Capital Center in Prince George's County Maryland (The MCI Center was just finishing being built). Webber was eventually acquitted by a jury of the assault, resisting arrest, possession of marijuana and driving under the influence charges, and paid $560 in fines for lesser violations.

Later in 1998 during the off-season, while leaving Puerto Rico on a promotional tour for Fila sneakers, Webber paid a $500 fine after U.S. Customs found marijuana in his bag. Soon after Fila dropped Webber as an endorser, a three-member panel of arbitrators awarded Webber $2.61 million for breach of contract.

After the closing of his first restaurant, property owner Promenade filed a $3 million lawsuit in 2010. The claims were for violating terms of a 20-year lease signed in 2005. Promenade was seeking funds to help re-lease the property and overdue rent.

== Discography ==
Webber also has produced hip hop records, including two songs for rapper Nas: "Blunt Ashes" and "Surviving the Times" and appeared on "Webber's Skit" from Naughty by Nature's Grammy Award-winning album Poverty's Paradise.

Album information
2 Much Drama
- Released: February 16, 1999
- Singles: "Gangsta, Gangsta (How U Do It)"

== Awards and achievements ==
- 5× NBA All-Star (1997, 2000–2003)
- All-NBA First Team (2001)
- 3× All-NBA Second Team (1999, 2002, 2003)
- All-NBA Third Team (2000)
- NBA Rookie of the Year (1994)
- NBA All-Rookie First Team (1994)
- 1999 NBA rebounding champion (13.0 rpg)
- 1991 Mr. Basketball USA
- 1991 Naismith Prep Player of the Year
- 1991 Gatorade National Player of the Year
- 1991 USA Today High School Player of the Year
- 1991 Parade High School Player of the Year
- 2× First-team Parade All-American (1990, 1991)
- McDonald's All-American Co-MVP (1991)
- Mr. Basketball of Michigan (1991)
- No. 4 retired by Sacramento Kings
- No. 44 retired by Detroit Country Day School
- 2021 Inductee to Naismith Basketball Hall of Fame

== Career statistics ==
Legend
GP	Games played	GS	Games started	MPG	Minutes per game
FG%	Field goal percentage	3P%	3-point field goal percentage	FT%	Free throw percentage
RPG	Rebounds per game	APG	Assists per game	SPG	Steals per game
BPG	Blocks per game	PPG	Points per game	**Bold**	Career high
*	Led the league

=== Regular season ===
Year	Team	GP	GS	MPG	FG%	3P%	FT%	RPG	APG	SPG	BPG	PPG
1993–94	Golden State	**76**	**76**	32.1	**.552**	.000	.532	9.1	3.6	1.2	**2.2**	17.5
1994–95	Washington	54	52	38.3	.495	.276	.502	9.6	4.7	1.5	1.6	20.1
1995–96	Washington	15	15	37.2	.543	**.441**	.594	7.9	5.0	**1.8**	.6	23.7
1996–97	Washington	72	72	39.0	.518	.397	.565	10.3	4.6	1.7	1.9	20.1
1997–98	Washington	71	71	39.6	.482	.317	.589	9.8	3.8	1.6	1.7	21.9
1998–99	Sacramento	42	42	**40.9**	.486	.118	.454	**13.0***	4.1	1.4	2.1	20.0
1999–00	Sacramento	75	75	38.4	.483	.284	.751	10.5	4.6	1.6	1.7	24.5
2000–01	Sacramento	70	70	40.5	.481	.071	.703	11.1	4.2	1.3	1.7	**27.1**
2001–02	Sacramento	54	54	38.4	.495	.263	.749	10.1	4.8	1.7	1.4	24.5
2002–03	Sacramento	67	67	39.1	.461	.238	.607	10.5	5.4	1.6	1.3	23.0
2003–04	Sacramento	23	23	36.1	.413	.200	.711	8.7	4.6	1.3	.9	18.7
2004–05	Sacramento	46	46	36.3	.449	.379	**.799**	9.7	**5.5**	1.5	.7	21.3
2004–05	Philadelphia	21	21	33.4	.391	.267	.776	7.9	3.1	1.2	.9	15.6
2005–06	Philadelphia	75	75	38.6	.434	.273	.756	10.0	3.4	1.4	.8	20.2
2006–07	Philadelphia	18	18	30.2	.387	.400	.643	8.3	3.4	1.0	.8	11.0
2006–07	Detroit	43	42	29.7	.489	.333	.636	6.7	3.0	1.0	.6	11.3
2007–08	Golden State	9	8	14.0	.484	—	.417	3.6	2.0	.4	.7	3.9
Career		831	827	37.1	.479	.299	.649	9.8	4.2	1.4	1.4	20.7
All-Star		4	2	19.0	.371	.333	.375	6.0	3.3	1.0	—	7.5

=== Playoffs ===
Year	Team	GP	GS	MPG	FG%	3P%	FT%	RPG	APG	SPG	BPG	PPG
1994	Golden State	3	3	36.3	.550	.000	.300	8.7	**9.0**	1.0	**3.0**	15.7
1997	Washington	3	3	35.3	**.633**	**.455**	.500	8.0	3.3	.7	2.3	15.7
1999	Sacramento	5	5	38.4	.388	.286	.400	9.4	4.0	**1.8**	1.0	14.8
2000	Sacramento	5	5	39.2	.427	.200	**.794**	9.6	5.4	1.6	2.0	**24.4**
2001	Sacramento	8	8	**43.5**	.388	.000	.694	**11.5**	3.1	1.1	1.0	23.3
2002	Sacramento	**16**	**16**	41.7	.502	.000	.596	10.8	4.7	.9	1.6	23.7
2003	Sacramento	7	7	35.1	.496	.000	.653	8.3	3.6	1.4	1.1	23.7
2004	Sacramento	12	12	37.2	.452	.250	.615	8.3	3.7	1.3	.8	18.4
2005	Philadelphia	5	5	37.2	.411	.357	.750	5.8	2.8	1.2	.2	19.0
2007	Detroit	**16**	**16**	25.2	.524	.000	.531	6.3	1.5	.9	.6	9.9
Career		80	80	36.2	.464	.269	.611	8.7	3.6	1.1	1.1	18.7

== See also ==
- List of NBA annual rebounding leaders
- List of NBA career triple-double leaders
- List of people banned or suspended by the NBA
