= Large Professor production discography =

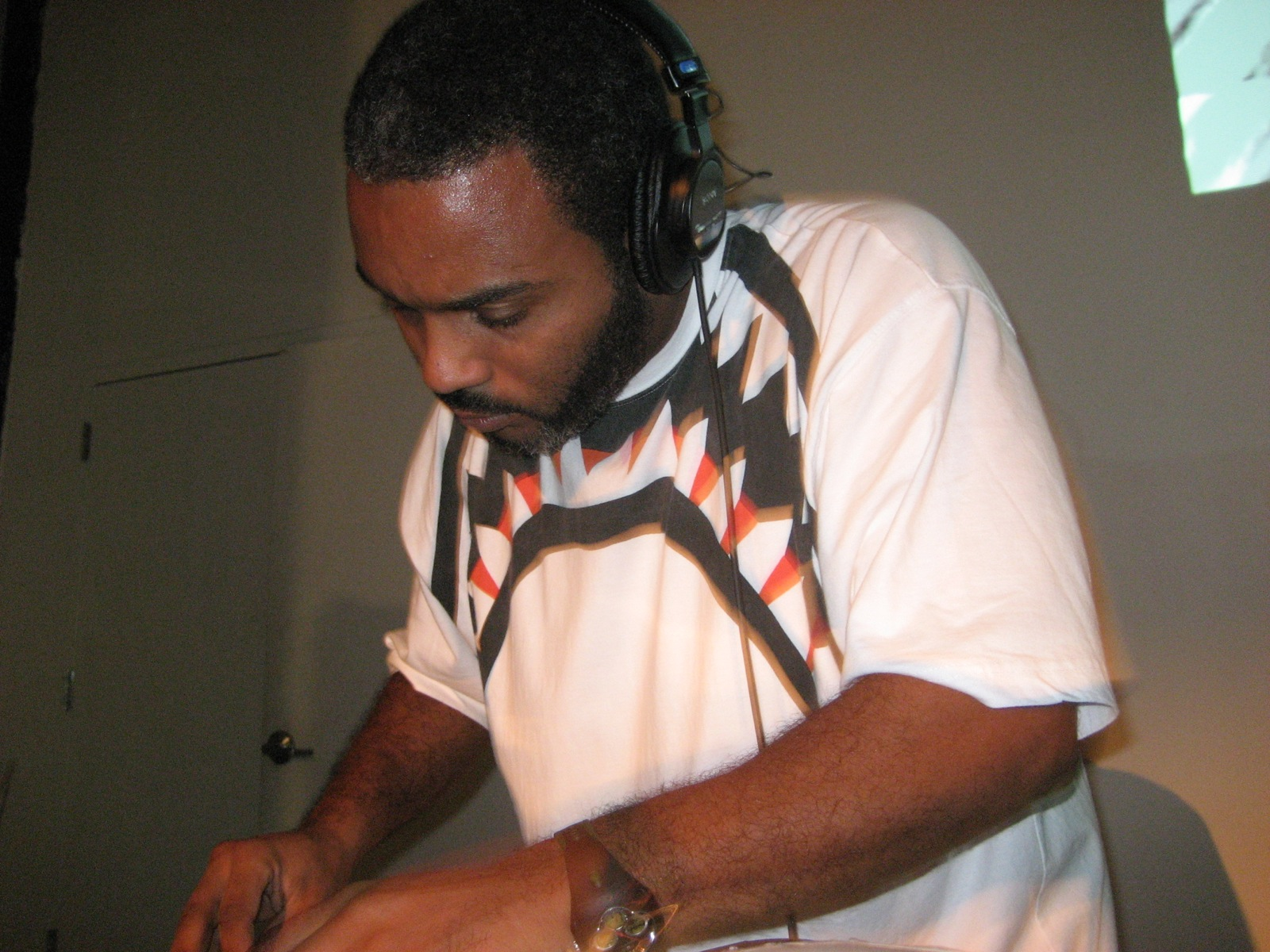
Large Professor in 2007

The following is a discography of production by Large Professor, an American hip hop musician and record producer. He is a former member of hip hop group Main Source; all songs credited as "produced by Main Source" are also listed.

== 1989 ==
=== Main Source – Think (VLS) ===
- A1. "Think"
- B1. "Atom"

== 1990 ==
=== Eric B. & Rakim – Let the Rhythm Hit 'Em ===
(Uncredited)

- 02. "No Omega" (drum programming)
- 03. "In the Ghetto"
- 04. "Step Back"

=== Intelligent Hoodlum – Intelligent Hoodlum ===
- 03. "Trag Invasion" {produced by Marley Marl, co-produced by Large Professor}
- 07. "Game Type" {produced by Marley Marl, co-produced by Joe Burgos & Large Professor}

=== Kool G Rap & DJ Polo – Erase Racism (VLS) ===
- B1. "Wanted: Dead or Alive (Remix)" {produced by Kool G Rap, Large Professor & Dr. Butcher}

=== Kool G Rap & DJ Polo – Wanted: Dead or Alive ===
(Uncredited)

- 01. "Streets of New York" {co-produced by Anton Pukshansky}
- 02. "Wanted: Dead or Alive"
- 03. "Money in the Bank" (featuring Large Professor, Freddie Foxxx & Ant Live)
- 04. "Bad to the Bone"
- 05. "Talk Like Sex"
- 06. "Play It Again, Polo"
- 08. "Kool Is Back"
- 09. "Play It Kool"
- 10. "Death Wish"

=== Lord Finesse & DJ Mike Smooth – Strictly for the Ladies (VLS) ===
- B1. "Keep It Flowing (Large Professor Remix)" (featuring A.G.) (released in 2019)

== 1991 ==
=== Big L – Rare Selections EP Vol. 1 ===
- A1. "Unexpected Flava" {co-produced by Lord Finesse} (released in 2005)

=== The Don – Wake Up the Party ===
- 02. "On Tour"
- 10. "Step Aside"

=== The Jaz – Ya Don't Stop ===
- 02. "Hypocritters"
- 05. "It's Your Nature"

=== Kid 'n Play – Slippin' (VLS) ===
- A1. "Slippin' (Large Professor's Hard Remix)"
- B1. "Slippin' (Large Professor's Vocal Mix)"

=== Kool G Rap & DJ Polo – Bad to the Bone (VLS) ===
- A1. "Bad to the Bone (Street Remix)" {co-produced by Kool G Rap}

=== Main Source – Breaking Atoms ===
- 01. "Snake Eyes"
- 02. "Just Hangin' Out"
- 03. "Looking at the Front Door"
- 04. "Large Professor"
- 05. "Just a Friendly Game of Baseball"
- 06. "Scratch & Kut"
- 07. "Peace Is Not the Word to Play"
- 08. "Vamos a Rapiar" {co-produced by Pete Rock}
- 09. "He Got So Much Soul (He Don't Need No Music)"
- 10. "Live at the Barbeque" (featuring Nas, Joe Fatal & Akinyele)
- 11. "Watch Roger Do His Thing"
- 12. "Just a Friendly Game of Baseball (Remix)" {bonus track}

=== Main Source – Just Hangin' Out (VLS) ===
- A2. "Just Hangin' Out (Your Hood – Remix)" {co-produced by Anton Pukshansky}

=== Main Source – Peace Is Not the Word to Play (VLS) ===
- A1. "Peace Is Not the Word to Play (Remix)" {co-produced by Anton Pukshansky}

=== Nikki D – Daddy's Little Girl ===
- 08. "Your Man Is My Man" {produced by Smooth Ice, additional production by Large Professor & Chris Champion}

=== Powerule – Volume 1 ===
- 15. "Gots Ta Get This" (featuring Large Professor) {co-produced by Powerule}

=== Slick Rick – It's a Boy (VLS) / Behind Bars ===
- B1. "It's a Boy (Remix)"

== 1992 ==
=== The Brand New Heavies – Bonafied Funk (VLS) ===
- A1. "Bonafied Funk (Main Source Mix)" [featuring Main Source]

=== Diamond D – Stunts, Blunts and Hip Hop ===
- 18. "Freestyle (Yo, That's That Shit)" {produced by Diamond D, co-produced by Large Professor}

=== Gang Starr – Gotta Get Over (Taking Loot) (VLS) ===
- A2. "Gotta Get Over (Taking Loot) [Remix]"

=== Pete Rock & CL Smooth – Mecca and the Soul Brother ===
- 05. "Act Like You Know" {produced by Pete Rock & CL Smooth, co-produced by Large Professor}

=== Roxanne Shante – The Bitch Is Back ===
- 02. "Deadly Rhymes" (featuring Kool G Rap) {co-produced by Kool G Rap}
- 10. "Brothers Ain't Shit" {co-produced by Kool G Rap}

=== Roxanne Shante – Straight Razor (VLS) ===
- B1. "Straight Razor (Large Professor Remix)"

=== Various artists – White Men Can't Rap (soundtrack) ===
- 03. "Fakin' the Funk" (performed by Main Source)

=== Various artists – Wild Pitch Classics ===
- A1. "How My Man Went Down in the Game" (performed by Main Source) {released in 1994}

=== Young Disciples – Apparently Nothin' (VLS) ===
- A1. "Apparently Nothin' (Large Professor Rap Mix)" [featuring Large Professor]

== 1993 ==
=== Akinyele – Vagina Diner ===
- 01. "Worldwide"
- 02. "Outta State"
- 03. "Ak Ha Ha! Ak Hoo Hoo?"
- 04. "Dear Diary"
- 05. "Bags Packed"
- 06. "The Bomb"
- 07. "Beat"
- 08. "Checkmate"
- 09. "I Luh Hur"
- 10. "You Know My Style"
- 11. "Exercise"
- 12. "No Exit"
- 13. "30 Days"

=== Apache – Apache Ain't Shit ===
- 07. "Hey Girl" (featuring Milo & Collie Weed)

=== Big Daddy Kane – Looks Like a Job For... ===
- 11. "Niggaz Never Learn"

=== Leaders of the New School – What's Next (VLS) ===
- A2. "What's Next (Remix)"

=== MC Shan – Pee-Nile Reunion (VLS) ===
- A2. "Pee-Nile Reunion" (featuring Neek the Exotic, Diesel, Kool G Rap & Snow) {produced by Kool G Rap & Large Professor}

=== Mobb Deep – Juvenile Hell ===
- 12. "Peer Pressure (The Large Professor Mix)"

=== Sample This! – Another Lie (VLS) ===
- A2. "Another Lie (Large Professor Remix)"

=== A Tribe Called Quest – Midnight Marauders ===
- 11. "Keep It Rollin'" (featuring Large Professor)

== 1994 ==
=== Beastie Boys – Sure Shot (VLS) ===
- B1. "Sure Shot (Large Professor Remix)"

=== Nas – Illmatic ===
- 05. "Halftime"
- 08. "One Time 4 Your Mind"
- 10. "It Ain't Hard to Tell"

=== Nas – It Ain't Hard to Tell (VLS) ===
- A1. "It Ain't Hard to Tell (Remix)"

=== Organized Konfusion – Stress (VLS) ===
- B2. "Stress (Remix)" [featuring Large Professor]

== 1995 ==
=== Akinyele – Break a Bitch Neck (VLS) {rare test press release} ===
- A1. "Break a Bitch Neck" (featuring Kool G Rap)

=== Common Sense – Resurrection (VLS) ===
- A2. "Resurrection (Extra P. Remix)"
- A3. "Resurrection (Large Professor Remix)"

=== Mad Skillz – The Nod Factor (VLS) ===
- B2. "Skillz in '95"

=== Nas – N/A ===
- 00. "Understanding" (featuring AZ & Biz Markie) {unreleased}

=== Tragedy Khadafi – Pass da Tek Remix (VLS) ===
- A1. "Pass da Tek (Remix)"
- B1. "Da Funk Mode (Remix)" [featuring Havoc]

== 1996 ==
=== Akinyele – N/A ===
- 00. "In the World (Large Professor Remix)" {unreleased}

=== Large Professor – The LP ===
(Originally completed in 1996, the album was shelved by Geffen Records. It was officially released in 2009; tracks 14 to 18 were recorded that year.)

- 01. "Intro"
- 02. "That Bullshit"
- 03. "Hungry"
- 04. "I Juswannachill"
- 05. "Funky 2 Listen 2"
- 06. "The Mad Scientist"
- 07. "Hard"
- 08. "One Plus One" (featuring Nas)
- 09. "The LP"
- 10. "Dancin' Girl"
- 11. "Large Pro: Verbs"
- 12. "Havin' Fun"
- 14. "Amaman"
- 15. "Queens Lounge"
- 16. "Bowne"
- 17. "Big Willie"
- 18. "Outro"

=== Large Professor – The Mad Scientist (VLS) ===
- B3. "Listen (Blast Off)"

=== Large Professor – I Juswannachill (VLS) ===
- B4. "The Mad Scientist (Remix)"

=== Mad Skillz – From Where??? ===
- 08. "Extra Abstract Skillz" (featuring Large Professor & Q-Tip)

=== Various artists – High School High: The Soundtrack ===
- 07. "The Rap World" (performed and produced by Large Professor & Pete Rock)

=== Various artists – The New Groove: The Blue Note Remix Project ===
- 02. "Hummin' (Large Professor Remix)" [performed by Cannonball Adderley]

== 1997 ==
=== B-1 – Hands of Time (VLS) ===
- A1. "Hands of Time" {released in 2013}

== 1998 ==
=== Lord the Arkitec – Listen Closely (Worldwide Pt. II) (VLS) ===
- B2. "Name of the Game (Friends)"

=== Neek the Exotic - Exotic's Raw (VLS) ===
- A1. "Exotic's Raw"

=== O.C. - More Jewelz ===
- 04. "War Games (Extra P Remix)

=== Various artists – The Flip Squad Allstar DJs ===
- 06. "It's da Biz" (performed by Biz Markie & Kia Jeffries)

== 1999 ==
=== Akinyele – Aktapuss ===
- 05. "Coochie"
- 17. "Rather Fuck You"

=== Chris Lowe & Large Professor – CT to Queens (VLS) ===
- A1. "CT to Queens (Uncut Action)" (co-produced by Chris Lowe}

=== Neek the Exotic – Make That Money (VLS) ===
- A1. "Make That Money"
- B2. "Real Hip Hop"

=== Neek the Exotic – Turn It Out (VLS) ===
- A1. "Turn It Out" (featuring Fortune)
- B1. "Money, Thugs" (featuring Royal Flush)

=== Neek the Exotic - Backs n Necks (VLS) ===
- A1. "Mothafuckin' Man" (feat. Joe Flav)
- A3. "Backs 'n Necks"
- A4. "Hardcore" (featuring Large Professor)

=== Nine Yards – Matter of Time (VLS) ===
- A2. "Matter of Time (Large Professor Remix)"

=== Rob Swift – Dope on Plastic (VLS) ===
- A1. "Dope on Plastic (Large Professor Remix)" [feat. Large Professor]

=== Guesswhyld – Bottom Line: The Soundtrack, Vol. 1 ===
- A1. "Yo, Yo" (Street Smartz and Large Professor)

=== Various artists – Wild Wild West: Music Inspired by the Motion Picture ===
- 12. "I Sparkle" (performed by Slick Rick)

== 2000 ==
=== Busta Rhymes – Anarchy ===
- 12. "The Heist" (featuring Ghostface Killah, Raekwon & Roc Marciano)

=== The Dwellas – The Last Shall Be First ===
- 03. "The Last Shall Be First" (featuring Large Professor)

=== Large Professor – Blaze Rhymez (VLS) ===
- A1. "Blaze Rhymez"

=== Large Professor – 'Bout That Time (VLS) ===
- B2. "LiveGuy Saga"

== 2001 ==
=== Canibus – Rip the Jacker (VLS) ===
- A3. "Canibustible"

=== I.G.T. – Street Music: The Preview ===
- 10. "Word to Life" (featuring Horace Brown)

=== Nas – Got Ur Self a Gun (VLS) ===
- A2. "Black Zombie"

=== Nas – Stillmatic ===
- 05. "You're da Man"
- 06. "Rewind"

=== Qwazmodoe – Find Out (VLS) ===
- A1. "Find Out"

=== The U.N. – World Domination: The Mixtape ===
- 11. "What They Want"

== 2002 ==
=== The Beatnuts – The Originators ===
- 07. "Originate" (featuring Large Professor)

=== Cormega – The True Meaning ===
- 09. "The Come Up" (featuring Large Professor)

=== Large Professor – 1st Class ===
- 01. "Intro"
- 02. "'Bout That Time" {original release: 2000}
- 03. "Ultimate"
- 04. "Brand New"
- 05. "Stay Chisel" (featuring Nas)
- 06. "Akinyele (Live at the BBQ, Pt. 2)" (featuring Akinyele)
- 08. "Born to Ball"
- 10. "The Man"
- 11. "Large Pro"
- 13. "Blaze Rhymez II"
- 14. "On" (featuring Busta Rhymes)
- 15. "Hip Hop"
- 16. "Radioactive"
- 17. "Back to Back" {bonus track}

=== Non Phixion – The Future Is Now ===
- 02. "Drug Music"
- 12. "It's Us"
- 15. "We Are the Future"

=== Rob Swift – Sound Event ===
- 04. "Hip Hop on Wax" (featuring Large Professor) {produced by Rob Swift, co-produced by Large Professor}

=== Various artists – The Anti-Backpack Movement ===
- 06. "151 Excuses" (performed by 151 Proof)

=== The X-Ecutioners – Built from Scratch ===
- 02. "XL" (featuring Large Professor)

== 2003 ==
=== Craig G – This Is Now!!! ===
- 11. "Love Is Love" (featuring Large Professor)

=== Lord Finesse – From the Crates to the Files ...The Lost Sessions ===
- 04. "Isn't He Something (Extra P Session Mix)"

=== Mic Geronimo – Long Road Back ===
- 15. "Up Now"

=== Neek the Exotic – Exotic's Raw ===
- 03. "Prepared to Get Stomped"
- 04. "Make That Money" (featuring Royal Flush) {original release: 1999}
- 05. "Don't Stop"
- 06. "Exotic's Raw" (featuring Large Professor) {original release: 1998}
- 07. "Backs 'n' Necks" {original release: 1999}
- 10. "Hardcore" (featuring Large Professor) {original release: 1999}
- 13. "The Mothafuckin Man" (featuring Joe Flav) {original release: 1999}
- 14. "This Here's Gangsta" (featuring Royal Flush & Universal)

== 2004 ==
=== Akinyele – Live at the Barbecue: Unreleased Hit's ===
- 02. "Murder"

=== Gore-Tex – Reload ===
- 02. "Pyramid"

=== Mr. Complex – Twisted Mister ===
- 15. "No Turning Back" (featuring Tia Thomas)

=== Nas – 10 Year Anniversary Illmatic Platinum Series ===
- 2-06. "Star Wars"

=== Rah Digga – Everything Is a Story (unreleased) ===
- 17. "I Need a Shorty" {co-produced by Shea Taylor}

== 2005 ==
=== Large Professor – The Beginning (VLS) ===
- A1. "The Beginning (Hood)"
- B1. "After School (Hood)"

=== Large Professor – Secret Design (VLS) ===
- A1. "Secret Design"
- B1. "Decisions"

=== Lord Finesse & DJ Mike Smooth – Here I Come (VLS) ===
- A1. "Here I Come (Remix) (Main)"

== 2006 ==
=== The Black Eyed Peas – Renegotiations: The Remixes ===
- 07. "Disco Club (Large Pro Peas Remix)"

=== Boot Camp Clik – The Last Stand ===
- 13. "World Wide"

=== Large Professor – N/A ===
- 00. "Rapid Fire"

=== Prince Po – Prettyblack ===
- 05. "Right 2 Know" (featuring Chas West)

=== Various artists – Re-Bop: The Savoy Remixes ===
- 05. "Minority (Large Professor's Tjaz Remix)" (performed by Cal Tjader)

== 2007 ==
=== Big Pun – In Memory Of... Volume One ===
- 10. "Tres Leches (Remix)" (featuring Prodigy & Inspectah Deck)

=== Grand Daddy I.U. – Stick to the Script ===
- 09. "Mack of the Year"

=== Jurassic 5 – N/A ===
- 00. "Hood in the USA"

=== Killa Sha – God Walk on Water ===
- 05. "Unbroken"
- 13. "Come On"

=== Mic Geronimo – Alive ===
- 14. "Nic Nac" (featuring Darcyde)

=== Styles P – The Ghost Sessions ===
- 08. "The Struggle"

=== Thisish – Thisish, Vol. 1 ===
- 10. "Large Professor Got Heat!!!"

=== Various artists – Free Speech: The Mixtape ===
- 09. "Do Que Somos Capaz" (performed by Black Mastah & Bob da Rage Sense) (produced by Large Professor & Bomberjack)

== 2008 ==
=== AZ – Undeniable ===
- 12. "The Hardest" (featuring Styles P)

=== Genocide – The Psy-Op Mixtape ===
- 04. "Epitome of Illness" (featuring Dave Lad, Emir KA & Orakle)

=== L.E.O. – Spiritual Intelligence ===
- 01. "So Glorious"
- 02. "King Leopold"
- 03. "Omnipotence"
- 04. "The Perfect Line"
- 05. "Right to Live" (featuring B.C.)
- 06. "No Sleep"
- 07. "Panic Button"
- 08. "Trainspotting"
- 09. "Mother of God"
- 10. "Triple 7" (featuring Billy Mage, Creyesis, Spit-Acular, Espionage, I-Dub & Scott Bluntz)
- 11. "Windows"

=== Large Professor – Main Source ===
- 01. "The Entrance"
- 02. "Hot: Sizzling, Scorching, Torching, Blazing"
- 03. "'Maica Livin'" (featuring Guardian Leep & Killa Sha)
- 04. "Pump Ya Fist" (featuring Mikey D & Lotto)
- 05. "Party Time"
- 06. "In the Ghetto"
- 08. "Frantic Barz"
- 09. "Sewin' Love"
- 10. "RuDopeDapnNoyd Pt. 1" (featuring Jeru the Damaja)
- 11. "RuDopeDapnNoyd Pt. 2" (featuring Lil' Dap)
- 12. "RuDopeDapnNoyd Pt. 3" (featuring Big Noyd)
- 13. "Classic Emergency"
- 14. "Rockin' Hip Hop"
- 15. "Large Pro Says"
- 16. "To the Meadows"

=== Lil' Dap – I.A. Dap ===
- 09. "In My Life Time"

=== Presto – State of the Art ===
- 17. "Conquer Mentally (Large Pro Remix)" (featuring Large Professor, O.C. & Sadat X)

=== Reks – Grey Hairs ===
- 05. "Stages"

=== Termanology – Politics as Usual ===
- 11. "Sorry I Lied to You"

== 2009 ==
=== Cormega – Born and Raised ===
- 08. "Journey"

=== Earatik Statik – The Good, the Bad and the Ugly ===
- 15. "No Problems (Extra P Remix)"

=== Grand Puba – Retroactive ===
- 06. "Same Old Drama" (featuring Large Professor)

=== Krumb Snatcha – Hidden Scriptures ===
- 11. "Mind Power"
- 14. "Heaven on Earth" (featuring Lauren)

=== Señor Kaos – Walk Softly and Carry a Big Brick ===
- 16. "Slick Money" (featuring P.So)

=== Termanology – Time Machine: Hood Politics VI ===
- 04. "Time Machine" (featuring Reks)

=== U-God – Dopium ===
- 11. "New Classic" (featuring Large Professor)

== 2010 ==
=== Cold Heat – Life Behind Bars ===
- 14. "Why You Wanna Do That" (featuring Craig G, Large Professor & Sean Price)

=== Killa Sha – Acknowledge the Vet ===
- 02. "Never Gonna Stop Me"

=== Neek the Exotic & Large Professor – Exotic Species ===
- 01. "Guess Who"
- 02. "Toast Tonight" (featuring Fortune & Satchel Page)
- 03. "Still on the Hustle"
- 07. "You Make My Head Swing (Extra P Remix)"
- 08. "We All About" (featuring Royal Flush)
- 09. "Turn It Out" (featuring Fortune)

=== Planet Asia & Gold Chain Military – Chain of Command ===
- 17. "Organic Food"

=== Rhymefest – Dangerous: 5-18 ===
- 07. "Bad Self" (featuring Rahzel)

== 2011 ==
=== Funkoars – The Quickening ===
- 02. "The Quickening"

=== J-Love – Egotistical Maniac ===
- 1-20. "I'm Not the One"

=== Joell Ortiz – Free Agent ===
- 12. "Oh!" (featuring Iffy)

=== Neek the Exotic & Large Professor – Still on the Hustle ===
- 01. "Still on the Hustle"
- 03. "Guess Who" (featuring Large Professor)
- 04. "Street Rebel" (featuring Joell Ortiz)
- 09. "Head Spin"
- 10. "Personal Freak"
- 11. "Toast Tonite" (featuring Fortune, Large Professor and Stachel Page)

=== Torae – For the Record ===
- 07. "Do the Math"

== 2012 ==
=== Large Professor – Professor @ Large ===
- 01. "Key to the City"
- 02. "UNOWHTMSAYN"
- 03. "Straight from the Golden" (featuring Busta Rhymes)
- 04. "Focused Up" (featuring Cormega & Tragedy Khadafi)
- 05. "Happy Days R Here" (featuring Lil' Fame)
- 07. "Light Years"
- 08. "Barber Shop Chop (Instrolude)"
- 09. "Live Again"
- 10. "Mack Don Illz" (featuring Mic Geronimo & Grand Daddy I.U.)
- 11. "Sun, Star & Crescents (Instrolude)"
- 12. "Kick da Habit"
- 13. "LP Surprise"
- 14. "Back in Time (Instrolude)"
- 15. "M.A.R.S." (featuring Cormega, Action Bronson, Roc Marciano & Saigon)

=== Large Professor – Key to the City (VLS) ===
- B1. "Key to the City (Mad Scientist Remix)"

=== Pete Flux – Mood Swings ===
- 05. "Large Is a Good Guy"

=== Public Enemy – Most of My Heroes Still Don't Appear on No Stamp ===
- 07. "Catch the Thrown" (featuring Cormega & Large Professor)

== 2013 ==
=== Ill Bill – The Grimy Awards ===
- 10. "Acid Reflux"
- 16. "Canarsie High"

=== J-Love – Not Designed to Quit ===
- 18. "Firenado" (featuring AG da Coroner, Prince Original & Take-It)

=== Mayer Hawthorne – Her Favorite Song (VLS) ===
- A2. "Her Favorite Song (Large Professor Remix)"

=== N.O.R.E. – Student of the Game ===
- 16. "Built Pyramids" (featuring Large Professor)

== 2014 ==
=== Cormega – Mega Philosophy ===
- 01. "A New Day Begins"
- 02. "MARS (The Dream Team)" (featuring AZ, Redman & Styles P)
- 03. "Industry"
- 04. "More" (featuring Chantelle Nandi)
- 05. "Reflection"
- 06. "D.U. (Divine Unity)" [featuring Nature]
- 07. "Honorable" (featuring Raekwon)
- 08. "Rap Basquiat"
- 09. "Rise" (featuring Maya Azucena)
- 10. "Home" (featuring Black Rob)
- 11. "Valuable Lessons" (featuring Jarell Perry)

=== Halfcut – From Dungeons to Rooftops ===
- 05. "Last Call"

=== Illa Ghee – Social Graffiti ===
- 15. "90"

=== Jeru the Damaja – The Hammer ===
- 06. "Solar Flares"

=== Various artists – Stashed in Fortress Volume 16 ===
- 28. "Kiss the Sky (Large Professor Remix)" ]performed by Blu]

== 2015 ==
=== Capone-N-Noreaga – Lessons ===
- 13. "Pizza"

=== Diamond District – March on Washington Redux ===
- 04. "Working Weekends"

=== Large Professor – Re:Living ===
- 01. "Re:Living"
- 02. "Dreams Don't Die"
- 03. "Opulence"
- 04. "Earn"
- 05. "Off Yo Azz on Yo Feet"
- 06. "In the Scrolls" (featuring G-Wiz)
- 07. "Own World" (featuring Fortune)
- 08. "Sophia Yo"
- 09. "New Train Ole Route" {produced by J-Love, co-produced by Large Professor}
- 10. "Industry RMX 2" (featuring Inspectah Deck, Cormega, Roc Marciano, Sadat X & Lord Jamar)
- 11. "NDN"

== 2016 ==
=== Homeboy Sandman – Kindness for Weakness ===
- 05. "It's Cold" (featuring Steve Arrington)

=== Meyhem Lauren – Piatto D'oro ===
- 07. "Not Guilty"

=== Reks – The Greatest X ===
- 09. "Gone Baby Gone"

=== Southpaw Chop – Here We Go (VLS) ===
- A1. "Here We Go (Remix)" [featuring Large Professor]

=== Timeless Truth – Cold Wave ===
- 09. "Wavelength"

=== Various artists – The Underworld 2 ===
- 17. "Legacy" (performed by Ill Bill, Sean Strange & Salome)

== 2017 ==
=== DJ Koss – Born to Live ===
- 15. "This Is Now (Large Professor Remix)" [featuring Keith Murray]

=== M-Dot – Ego and the Enemy ===
- 07. "The Empathy"

=== Powerule – The Anomaly: Reloaded ===
- 02. "Glorify n Praise" (featuring Large Professor)
- 10. "American Horror Story"

== 2018 ==
=== Son of Sam – Come a Long Way (VLS) ===
- B1. "Come a Long Way (The Extra P Remix)" [featuring Large Professor & Masta Ace]

=== U-God – Venom ===
- 08. "Felon"

== 2019 ==
=== Truth – The Fight for Survival ===
- 14. "TNT (Remix)" [featuring Tragedy Khadafi]

== 2020 ==
=== The Lox – Living Off Xperience ===
- 09. "Think of the LOX" (featuring Westside Gunn & Benny the Butcher)

== 2021 ==
=== Al Skratch – N/A ===
- 00. "Be Original"

=== Papoose – April ===
- 02. "Represent"

=== Papoose – September ===
- 03. "Cold Winter"

=== The Xav - Black Duke ===
- 02. "Black Duke"
- 07. "Bad Rap"

== 2022 ==
=== Cormega - The Realness II ===
- 06. "Life and Rhyme"

== 2023 ==
=== Paul Wall & Termanology – Start Finish Repeat ===
- 04. "Houston BBQ" (featuring Bun B)
- 05. "Talk About It"

== 2026 ==
=== AZ – Doe or Die III ===
- 03. "Gimme The World" (featuring Jadakiss)
