= Jeru the Damaja discography =

- Studio albums: 5
- EPs: 1
- Singles: 19

The discography of Jeru the Damaja, an American hip hop musician, consists of five studio albums, one extended play and nineteen singles. His most successful album to date is his sophomore album Wrath of the Math, which peaked at #35 on the Billboard 200 in 1996. Jeru's only song to date to chart on the Billboard Hot 100 is his debut single "Come Clean", which peaked at #88 in 1993.

== Albums ==
=== Studio albums ===
Title	Album details	Peak chart positions			
Title	Album details	US	US R&B	CAN	UK
The Sun Rises in the East	Release date: May 24, 1994; Label: Payday/FFRR; Formats: LP, CD, CS	36	5	—	—
Wrath of the Math	Release date: October 15, 1996; Label: Payday/FFRR; Formats: LP, CD, CS	35	3	13	79
Heroz4Hire	Release date: September 7, 1999; Label: Know Savage; Formats: LP, CD, CS	—	—	—	—
Divine Design	Release date: September 23, 2003; Label: Ashenafi; Formats: LP, CD	—	—	—	—
Still Rising	Release date: October 16, 2007; Label: Ashenafi; Format: CD	—	—	—	—

=== Extended plays ===
Title	Album details
The Hammer	Release date: June 17, 2014; Label: Hedspinn; Format: Digital download

== Singles ==
Year	Single	Peak chart positions					Album
Year	Single	US Hot 100	US Rap	US R&B	US Dance	UK	Album
1993	"Come Clean"	88	10	53	6	—	The Sun Rises in the East
1994	"D. Original"	—	22	74	6	—	The Sun Rises in the East
1994	"You Can't Stop the Prophet"	—	45	—	44	84	The Sun Rises in the East
1995	"Return of the Crooklyn Dodgers" (with Crooklyn Dodgers)	—	65	—	—	27	Clockers (soundtrack)
1995	"1, 2 Pass It" (with D&D All-Stars)	—	90	—	—	84	The D&D Project
1996	"Ya Playin' Yaself"	—	20	57	6	67	Wrath of the Math
1996	"One Day"	—	—	—	—	—	Wrath of the Math
1996	"Me or the Papes"	—	—	78	18	77	Wrath of the Math
1998	"Billie Jean (Safe Sex)"	—	—	—	—	—	Heroz4Hire
1998	"Anotha Victim"	—	—	—	—	—	Heroz4Hire
1999	"99.9%"	—	—	—	—	—	Heroz4Hire
2001	"Great Solar Stance"	—	—	—	—	—	Heroz4Hire
2001	"Renegade Slave"	—	—	—	—	—	Heroz4Hire
2002	"Blak Luv"	—	—	—	—	—	Heroz4Hire
2002	"Rasta Powers"	—	—	—	—	—	Divine Design
2003	"War"	—	—	—	—	—	Divine Design
2004	"Rap Wars"	—	—	—	—	—	Divine Design

=== Promotional singles ===
Year	Single	Album
1995	"Da Bichez"	The Sun Rises in the East
1997	"East New York Stalks"	Non-album single
1997	"Friend or Foe"	Non-album single
2001	"It Beez Like Dat"	Non-album single
2004	"Don't Get It Twisted"	Non-album single

=== As featured performer ===
Year	Single	Album
1997	Seein' Is Believing (Jeru Remix)	Adriana Evans
1998	Flip the Mic	Northern Sulphuric Soul
2000	El Presidente	DJ Honda III
2003	Verses of Doom	Muskabeatz
2020	Real Hip-Hop	It's Bigger Than Music

=== Guest Shots ===
Year	Track	Album	Other Voices
1992	I'm the Man	Daily Operation	Guru, Lil' Dap
1994	Speak Ya Clout	Hard to Earn	Guru, Lil' Dap
1994	Graffiti	Blowout Comb	Digable Planets
1995	Invasion	New Jersey Drive, Vol. 2 / Wrath of the Math	—
1995	The Frustrated Nigga	Pump Ya Fist (soundtrack) / Wrath of the Math	—
1995	When I Flow	Riverside Pictures	Walkin' Large
1996	Suicide or Murder	My Experience	Bounty Killer
1997	Me, Not the Paper (Me or the Papes Remix)	Non-album single	—
1999	East New York Stamp	Ghost Dog: The Way of the Samurai (soundtrack)	Afu-Ra
2019	From a Distance	One of the Best Yet	Gang Starr

== Music videos ==
Year	Song	Director
1993	"Come Clean"	Dave Perez-Shadi
1994	"D. Original"	Lionel C. Martin
1994	"You Can't Stop the Prophet"	Adisa
1995	Return of the Crooklyn Dodgers	
1995	1, 2 Pass It	
1996	"Ya Playin' Yaself"	Nick Quested
1997	"Me or the Papes"	Marc Klasfeld
2000	"El Presidente" (DJ Honda feat.)	
