= Eat Pussy =

Eating pussy is slang for the sex act cunnilingus.

Eat Pussy may also refer to:

== In music ==
- "Eat Pussy", a song by Akinyele from Anakonda, 2001
- "Eat Pussy", a song by N.O.R.E. from Noreality, 2007
- "Smoke Weed Eat Pussy", a song by Ängie, 2016

== As a food ==
- Cat meat, the human consumption of a cat
