= The Mad Scientist =

The Mad Scientist may refer to:

- Mad scientist, a stock character
- The Mad Scientist (song), a 1996 song by Large Professor
- Mad Scientist (or Dr. Delirium), an animatronic sold at Spirit Halloween in 2008
- Superman (1941 film), also known as The Mad Scientist, the first installment of a series of films based upon the character Superman
