= State of the art (disambiguation) =

State of the art often refers to the highest level of development of a device, technique, or scientific field, achieved at a particular time.

State of the art may also refer to:

- State of the art, a patent law concept, which is a synonym of prior art
- The State of the Art, a collection of short fiction by Iain M. Banks
- State of the Art (book), a book by American film critic Pauline Kael
- State of the Art (Shinhwa album), a 2006 album by Shinhwa
- State of the Art (Hilltop Hoods album), a 2009 album by Hilltop Hoods
- State of the Art (Jimmy McGriff album), a 1985 album by jazz organist Jimmy McGriff
- State of the Art (Presto album)
- "State of the Art", the eighth track on the album Making Mirrors by Gotye
- "State of the Art" (Sliders), an episode of the television series Sliders
