= Heroz4Hire =

Studio album by Jeru the Damaja
- Released: September 7, 1999
- Recorded: 1998–1999
- Genre: Hip-hop
- Length: 45:38
- Label: Knowsavage
- Producer: Jeru the Damaja

Jeru the Damaja chronology
Wrath of the Math (1996)	Heroz4Hire (1999)	Divine Design (2003)

Heroz4Hire is the third studio album by hip-hop artist Jeru the Damaja. It was produced by Jeru himself, unlike his first two albums, which were produced by DJ Premier.

== Album information ==
This album lacked the critical acclaim of Jeru's first two albums. It also did not chart, or have any charting singles.

The album features Miz Marvel and Lil' Dap (of Group Home) as guests. Afu-Ra is not featured, as on Jeru's previous albums.

Miz Marvel, a member of Jeru's Supahuman Klik and Knowsavage record label, appears on four tracks.

== Reception ==
Professional ratings
Review scores
Source	Rating
AllMusic	3/5 stars
Q	3/5 stars

John Bush of AllMusic enjoyed the production, claiming that it was similar to Premier's work in its rawness, but with fewer catchy hooks.

Q (6/00, p. 108) - 3 stars out of 5 - "Creative and coherent...the lyrics are intelligent, and the record benefits from contributions by the very talented Mizmarvel."

The Wire (5/00, p. 53) - "Harks back to a primordial age of HipHop basics, and there's no question that he's got the lyrical flow and gaunt studio talent to pull it off....boldly speaking of purity and survival."

== Track listing ==
- All songs written and produced by Jeru the Damaja

#	Title	Performer (s)
1	"Supahuman Theme"	*Interlude*
2	"Great Solar Stance"	Jeru the Damaja
3	"Verbal Battle"	Jeru the Damaja, Miz Marvel
4	"Bitchez wit Dikz"	Jeru the Damaja, Miz Marvel, Lil' Dap
5	"Seinfeld"	Jeru the Damaja
6	"Renegade Slave"	Jeru the Damaja
7	"Presha"	Jeru the Damaja
8	"Superhumanz n Luv (Interlude)"	*Interlude*
9	"Anotha Victim"	Jeru the Damaja, Miz Marvel
10	"Billie Jean (Safe Sex)"	Jeru the Damaja
11	"Blak Luv"	Jeru the Damaja
12	"What a Day"	Jeru the Damaja
13	"Miz Marvel"	Jeru the Damaja, Miz Marvel
14	"99.9%"	Jeru the Damaja

== Album singles ==
Single information
"99.9%"
- Released: 1999
- B-side: "Verbal Battle"
"Blak Luv"
- Released: 2002
- B-side:
