= Aktapuss =

1999 studio album by Akinyele

Studio album by Akinyele
- Released: November 23, 1999
- Recorded: 1999
- Genre: Hip-hop; dirty rap
- Length: 75:08
- Label: Volcano; Jive; BMG 61422-31153
- Producer: Dr. Butcher; Large Professor; Key Tec; Buckwild; Lord Finesse

Akinyele chronology
Put It in Your Mouth (1996)	Aktapuss (1999)	Anakonda (2001)

Professional ratings
Review scores
Source	Rating
AllMusic	2/5 stars
The Encyclopedia of Popular Music	2/5 stars
The Source	4/5 stars

Aktapuss is the second studio album by American rapper Akinyele. It was released in November 23rd, 1999 on Volcano/Jive Records. The album served as the soundtrack to the film of the same name.

It was modest success, peaking at No. 64 on the Top R&B/Hip-Hop Albums. It made No. 33 on the Top Heatseekers; its single, "Take a Lick", made it to No. 87 on the Hot R&B/Hip-Hop Singles & Tracks and No. 9 on the Hot Rap Singles.

== Track listing ==
No.	Title	Length
1.	"Get Up"	4:13
2.	"Pussy Makes the World Go Round"	4:41
3.	"Butt Naked"	4:05
4.	"Take a Lick"	3:30
5.	"Coochie"	4:15
6.	"Three"	4:55
7.	"Sister, Sister"	3:20
8.	"How Do You Feel"	3:44
9.	"Sky's the Limit"	4:24
10.	"Juan Valdez, Love"	4:04
11.	"Sex in the City"	4:01
12.	"Ak Da Hoe"	2:50
13.	"Really Love Me"	3:27
14.	"Down South"	5:44
15.	"Messin' with My Cru"	3:53
16.	"Sha La La"	3:53
17.	"Rather Fuck You"	2:49
18.	"Niggas & Bitches"	3:59
19.	"Put It in Your Mouth"	3:21

== Samples ==
Get Up

- "Expressions" by Willie Mitchell

Coochie

- "Part Time Love" by Gladys Knight & the Pips

Sister, Sister

- "Inside My Love" by Jimmy Stewart
- "In the Rain" by the Dramatics

Sky's the Limit

- "Safari" by Frank Walton

Juan Valdez, Love

- "Walk On By" by Arif Mardin

Sex in the City

- "Donde Brilla el Sol" by Amanda Miguel

Down South

- "Avant de Nous de Dire Adieu" by Jeane Manson

Messin' with My Cru

- "Sandy" by David Axelrod

Sha La La

- "Revelations" by the Rimshots

Niggas & Bitches

- "Got to Find My Own Place" by Stanley Clarke

Put It in Your Mouth

- "Fun" by Brick
- "I'm Glad You're Mine" by Al Green
