= State of the Arts =

Studio album by Afu-Ra
- Released: June 14, 2005
- Studios: The Wax Museum (Brooklyn, NY); Crib Studios
- Genre: Hip-hop
- Length: 1:01:26
- Labels: Lifeforce; Decon
- Producers: Afu-Ra; Big Syphe; Bronze Nazareth; Compressor Beats; DJ Kemo; DJ Premier; DJ Roach; Eric Weis; Natty Dread; P.F. Cuttin'; Preservation

Afu-Ra chronology
Perverted Monks (2004)	State of the Arts (2005)	Body of the Life Force Part 2 (2012)

Singles from State of the Arts
- 1. "Poisonous Taoist/Sucka Free" Released: May 3, 2005; 2. "Why Cry" Released: August 23, 2005; 3. "God of Rap" Released: January 17, 2006

Professional ratings
Review scores
Source	Rating
PopMatters	4/10
RapReviews	7/10

State of the Arts is the third solo studio album by American rapper Afu-Ra. It was released on June 14, 2005 via Lifeforce Records and Decon. Recording sessions took place at the Wax Museum in Brooklyn and at Crib Studios. Production was handled by P.F. Cuttin', Eric Weis, Big Syphe, Bronze Nazareth, Compressor Beats, DJ Kemo, DJ Premier, DJ Roach, Natty Dread, Preservation, and Afu-Ra himself. It features guest appearances from Gentleman, Jahdan Blakkamoore, Kardinal Offishall, Lady Blue, Masta Killa, Q and Royce da 5'9". The album was supported by three singles: "Poisonous Taoist/Sucka Free", "Why Cry" and "God of Rap". The latter was featured in 2005 video game NBA Live 06.

== Track listing ==
No.	Title	Writer(s)	Producer(s)	Length
1.	"Intro"		Afu-Ra	1:29
2.	"God of Rap"	Aaron Phillip; Eric Steinen	Eric Weis	3:59
3.	"Power Skit #1"		P.F. Cuttin'; Afu-Ra	0:44
4.	"Pusha" (featuring Royce da 5'9")	Phillip; Ryan Montgomery; Joe Roach	DJ Roach	4:52
5.	"Prankster"	Phillip; Felix Rovira	P.F. Cuttin'	4:12
6.	"Livin Like Dat" (featuring Masta Killa)	Phillip; Elgin Turner; Justin Cross	Bronze Nazareth	3:26
7.	"Rumble"	Phillip; Steinen	Eric Weis	3:51
8.	"Power Skit #2"		P.F. Cuttin'; Afu-Ra	0:12
9.	"Why Cry" (featuring Gentleman)	Phillip; Tilmann Otto; Cristian Bahamonde	DJ Kemo	4:34
10.	"Ghetto Hell"	Phillip; Gavan Daly	Natty Dread	3:44
11.	"Cry Baby" (featuring Lady Blue and Q)	Phillip	Compressor Beats	4:31
12.	"Dynamite"	Phillip	Preservation	3:57
13.	"Sucka Free"	Phillip; Christopher Martin	DJ Premier	3:58
14.	"Deal Wit It" (featuring Kardinal Offishall and Jahdan Blakkamoore)	Phillip; Jason Harrow; Wayne Henry; Rovira	P.F. Cuttin'	4:47
15.	"BK Dance"	Phillip; Adrian Trejo	Big Syphe	4:18
16.	"Only U"	Phillip; Steinen	Eric Weis	4:18
17.	"Poisonous Taoist"	Phillip; Rovira	P.F. Cuttin'	4:03
18.	"Power Skit #3"		P.F. Cuttin'; Afu-Ra	0:31
Total length:				1:01:26

== Personnel ==
- Aaron "Afu-Ra" Phillip – producer (tracks: 1, 3, 8, 18), executive producer, A&R
- Eric Steinen – producer, recording & mixing (tracks: 2, 7, 16)
- Felix "P.F. Cuttin'" Rovira – producer (tracks: 3, 5, 8, 14, 17, 18), recording (tracks: 2, 4-7, 9-17), mixing (tracks: 4-6, 9-12, 14, 17), associate producer, production coordinator
- Joe Roach – producer (track 4)
- Justin "Bronze Nazareth" Cross – producer (track 6)
- Cristian "DJ Kemo" Bahamonde – producer (track 9), mixing (track 15)
- Gavan "Natty Dread" Daly – producer (track 10)
- Compressor Beats – producer (track 11)
- Jean "DJ Preservation" Daval – producer (track 12)
- Christopher "DJ Premier" Martin – producer & mixing (track 13)
- Adrian "Big Syphe" Trejo – producer (track 15)
- Larry Lachmann – mastering
- Azad Mardukhi – co-executive producer, A&R, management
- Peter Bittenbender – co-executive producer
- Mattias Lundin – art direction, design
- Stella Magliore – photography
