= 1st Class (album) =

Studio album by Large Professor
- Released: October 8, 2002
- Studios: Bang'n Studios (Queens, N.Y.); C Mo' Greens Studio (Queens, N.Y.)
- Genre: Hip hop
- Length: 56:21
- Labels: Matador; OLE 509
- Producers: Hill, Inc.; J-Love; Large Professor; Xplicit

Large Professor chronology
| The LP (2002) | 1st Class (2002) | Main Source (2008) |

Singles from 1st Class
- 1. "Bout That Time" Released: August 29, 2000; 2. "Radio Active" Released: September 24, 2002

Professional ratings
Review scores
| Source | Rating |
|---|---|
| AllMusic | 2/5 stars |
| Pitchfork | 7.5/10 |
| RapReviews | 5.5/10 |

1st Class is the second full-length studio album by American rapper and producer the Large Professor. It was released on October 8, 2002, through Matador Records. Recording sessions took place at Bang'n Studios and C Mo' Greens Studio in Queens. Production was handled by Large Professor himself, Hill, J-Love and Xplicit, with Kenneth Johnson serving as executive producer. It features guest appearances from Akinyele, Busta Rhymes, Nas and Q-Tip.

The album didn't reach the Billboard 200 chart, however, it peaked at No. 52 on the Top R&B/Hip-Hop Albums and at No. 21 on both the Independent Albums and the Heatseekers Albums charts in the United States. Its lead single, "'Bout That Time", made it to No. 38 on the Hot Rap Songs, while the album's second single, "Radioactive", reached only No. 43 on the Hot R&B/Hip-Hop Singles Sales.

== Track listing ==
| No. | Title | Writer(s) | Producer(s) | Length |
|---|---|---|---|---|
| 1. | "Intro" | William Paul Mitchell | Large Professor | 1:36 |
| 2. | "'Bout That Time" | Mitchell | Large Professor | 3:30 |
| 3. | "Ultimate" | Mitchell | Large Professor | 2:55 |
| 4. | "Brand New" | Mitchell | Large Professor | 3:28 |
| 5. | "Stay Chisel" (featuring Nas) | Mitchell; Nasir Jones | Large Professor | 2:32 |
| 6. | "Akinyele (Live at the BBQ, Pt. 2)" (featuring Akinyele) | Mitchell; Akinyele Adams | Large Professor | 2:22 |
| 7. | "In the Sun" (featuring Q-Tip) | Mitchell; Jonathan Davis; Thomas Raic | Xplicit | 4:28 |
| 8. | "Born to Ball" | Mitchell | Large Professor | 3:48 |
| 9. | "Kool" | Mitchell; Jason Elias | J-Love | 3:47 |
| 10. | "The Man" | Mitchell | Large Professor | 4:23 |
| 11. | "Large Pro" | Mitchell | Large Professor | 3:23 |
| 12. | "Alive in Stereo" | Mitchell; Tommie Spearman | Hill, Inc | 4:06 |
| 13. | "Blaze Rhymez II" | Mitchell | Large Professor | 3:44 |
| 14. | "On" (featuring Busta Rhymes) | Mitchell; Trevor Smith | Large Professor | 2:49 |
| 15. | "Hip Hop" | Mitchell | Large Professor | 4:25 |
| 16. | "Radioactive" | Mitchell | Large Professor | 5:05 |
| Total length: | | | | 56:21 |

== Personnel ==
- William Paul "Large Professor" Mitchell – vocals, producer (tracks: 1–6, 8, 10, 11, 13–16)
- Nasir "Nas" Jones – vocals (track 5)
- Akinyele Adams – vocals (track 6)
- Jonathan "Q-Tip" Davis – vocals (track 7)
- Trevor "Busta Rhymes" Smith – vocals (track 13)
- Thomas "Xplicit" Raic – producer (track 7)
- Jason "J-Love" Elias – producer (track 9), A&R
- Tommie "Hill, Inc" Spearman – producer (track 12)
- Pablo Puente – recording, mixing (tracks: 1, 2, 4–15)
- Max Vargas – recording & mixing (tracks: 3, 16)
- James Cruz – mastering
- Kenneth Johnson – executive producer, A&R
- Mark Ohe – art direction
- Matthew Salacuse – photography

== Charts ==
| Chart (2002) | Peak position |
|---|---|
| UK R&B Albums (Official Charts) | 39 |
| UK Independent Albums (Official Charts) | 43 |
| US Top R&B/Hip-Hop Albums (Billboard) | 52 |
| US Independent Albums (Billboard) | 21 |
| US Heatseekers Albums (Billboard) | 21 |
