= White Men Can't Jump (video game) =

1995 video game

- Cover art in all regions by Damion Davis
- Developer: High Voltage Software
- Publisher: Atari Corporation
- Producers: Allen Edwards; Kevin Hunt
- Programmer: Adisak Pochanayon
- Platform: Atari Jaguar
- Release: NA: August 1, 1995; EU: August 1995
- Genre: Sports
- Modes: Single-player, multiplayer

White Men Can't Jump is a 1995 basketball video game developed by High Voltage Software (HVS) and published by Atari for the Atari Jaguar. It is loosely based on the 1992 20th Century Fox film of the same name. The game features a loose version of basketball known as streetball. It can be played against computer-controlled opponents, or up to four human competitors using the Team Tap multitap.

In 1993, Trimark Pictures expanded into the video game market as Trimark Interactive. Having negotiated the rights to White Men Can't Jump from 20th Century Fox, Trimark commissioned HVS to create a video game adaptation. As one of the first game projects for both Trimark and HVS, the game was developed by hiring the Jesse White Tumbling Team for motion capture. It garnered mixed reception from critics; many complimented its multiplayer aspect with the Team Tap peripheral, but others expressed mixed opinions regarding the visuals, audio, and gameplay. Retrospective commentary has been equally mixed, with some calling it one of the worst video games of all time.

== Gameplay ==
A match between the 3pt. Kings and the Surf Crew at the Venice Beach court

White Men Can't Jump is a two-on-two half court basketball game. It is described as a simulator of streetball, a variation of basketball with loose rules, similar to NBA Jam and Jammit.

Players compete against each other or computer-controlled opponents, selecting between two modes of play: Versus and Tournament. Versus is a standard single match mode for up to four players. Tournament is a season mode for one or two players, where the main objective is to enter the Slam City tournament. The player starts with $500 borrowed from loan sharks and must earn $5,000 for the tournament entry fee by betting the money on a series of 30 matches. Winning a match increases the player's overall reputation, as does the betting amounts for subsequent matches. After the player collects enough money, they automatically enter the tournament at the Inglewood Forum, but the game is over if the player fails to pay back the loan sharks.

Players can pass the ball, fake a pass, jump and shoot. The player can also punch and knock down their opponents, or spend energy to increase speed. The more energy a player has, the more likely they are to pull off a special slam dunk at a distance from the basket. During gameplay, the camera perspective pans and zooms based on the action. In single-player mode, the player can switch between the two team members, with the AI automatically controlling the other team member. There are fifteen two-person teams, each with unique statistics and slam dunks. The game also features four different courts to choose from. Matches are ended by either a time limit or point limit.

== Development and release ==
White Men Can't Jump for the Atari Jaguar is loosely based on the 1992 20th Century Fox film of the same name. It was the first title developed by High Voltage Software (HVS), an Illinois-based game developer founded by Kerry J. Ganofsky in 1993. That year, plans for a video game adaptation of White Men Can't Jump were announced following a licensing agreement between 20th Century Fox and Trimark Interactive, a subsidiary formed by Trimark Pictures to expand into the video and computer game markets. Trimark Interactive acquired the rights to make a game on all platforms and commissioned HVS to design it, entering production as one of Trimark Interactive's first games for Jaguar.

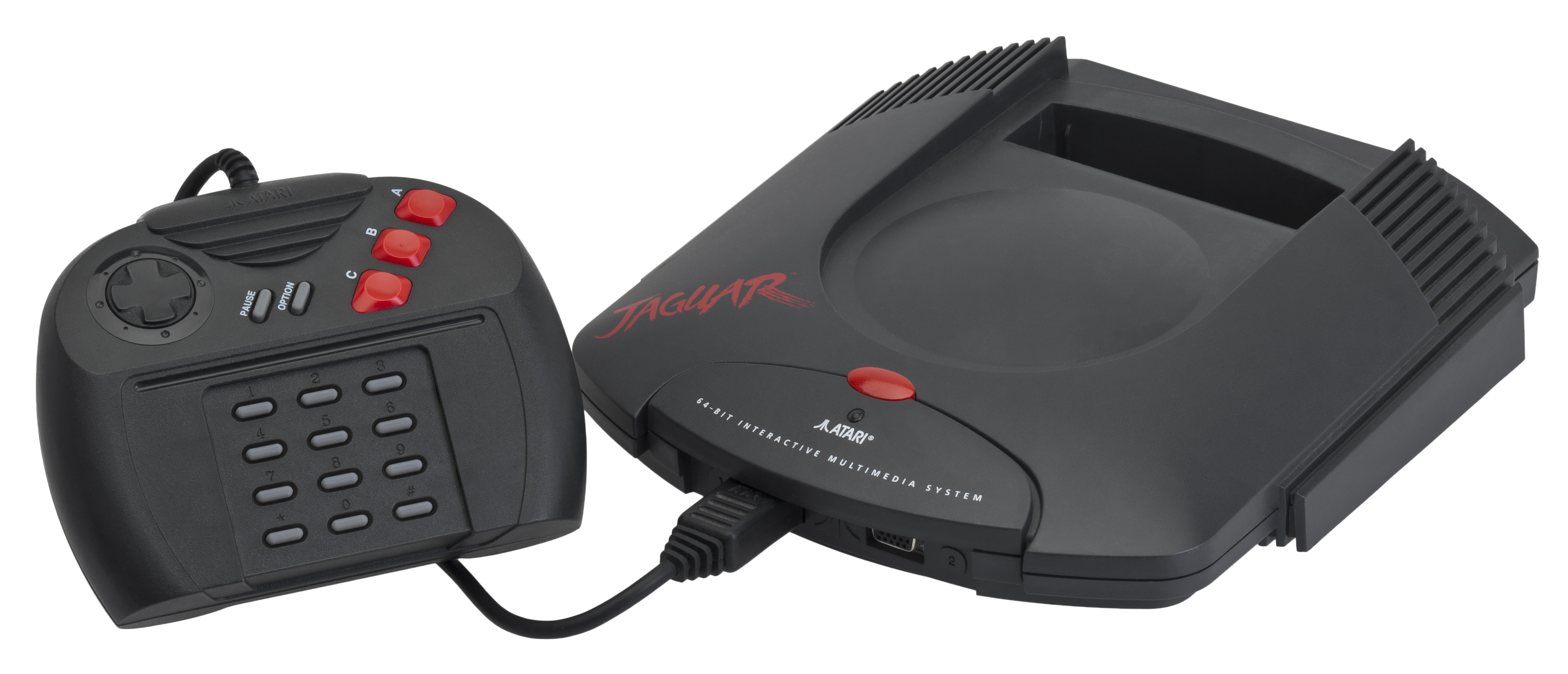
White Men Can't Jump for the Atari Jaguar was the first game developed by High Voltage Software

The game was co-produced by Allen Edwards and Kevin Hunt, with Adisak Pochanayon doing all the programming. The cover was illustrated by Damion Davis, as his first work in the video game industry before becoming lead artist at HVS. According to Ruiner Pinball programmer Scott Corley, HVS hired the Jesse White Tumbling Team to perform movements of the game's characters, and their motion captures were digitized in Deluxe Paint.

White Men Can't Jump for the Atari Jaguar was first showcased at the 1994 Summer Consumer Electronics Show, announced for release in the first quarter of 1995. The game made additional appearances at tradeshows in 1995, such as the Winter CES, the ECTS Spring event, and E3 1995. It was also showcased at the Atari offices during "Fun 'n' Games Day", an event to showcase upcoming Jaguar titles to journalists. The game was published by Atari in North America and Europe in August 1995, becoming the first basketball game for the Jaguar. It came bundled with the Team Tap multitap, allowing four players to participate.

== Reception ==
Reception

Review scores
Publication	Score
Electronic Gaming Monthly	5/10
EP Daily	3/10
Game Players	73%
GamesMaster	46%
M! Games	32%
Mega Fun	71%
Next Generation	3/5
Player One	40%
ST Format	22%
Video Games (DE)	56%
Atari Explorer Online	4/5
Atari Gaming Headquarters	8/10
ST-Computer	63%
ST Magazine	73%
Ultimate Future Games	35%

White Men Can't Jump for the Atari Jaguar received mixed reception from critics. The multiplayer aspect with the Team Tap multitap earned praise. Game Players' Patrick Baggatta considered it the definitive way to play it. Mega Fun's Timur Özelsel criticized the single-player AI, feeling that the game is fun with more players. Next Generation also remarked that multiple players are required to fully enjoy it.

Reviewers were divided regarding the gameplay and controls. Baggatta approved of the game's simulation of streetball, while Next Generation praised the game's balance and intense violence. GamePro's Jon Robinson said that the controls often fail to respond and shots tend to miss even when the player is next to the basket. MAN!AC's Martin Gaksch wrote that "White Men Can't Jump is just as far removed from the sophisticated controls of an NBA Jam". ST Magazine's Marc Abramson stated that the controls take time to get used to, while Video Games' Jan Barysch felt that the fun factor was undermined by poor controls and frustrating AI.

The graphics and camera drew criticism. The two sports critics of EGM criticized the confusing camera perspective and poor animation. Özelsel initially found it confusing due to the perspective. Player One's Denis Adloff faulted the pixelated characters when they are close to the screen. ST-Computer's Rainer Fröhlich found it visually unattractive due to its dull colors. ST Format's Stuart Campbell lambasted the jerky frame rate, while The Electric Playground's Victor Lucas panned the confusing camera work. Journalists were also divided over the audio. Atari Gaming Headquarters' Mark Santora said the music leaves much to be desired, while Abramson commended its soundtrack. Baggatta felt that the trash-talking voices quickly became annoying, while Next Generation praised the street-style audio commentary.

=== Retrospective coverage ===
Retrospective commentary for White Men Can't Jump has been equally mixed. Writing for MyAtari magazine, Robert Jung highlighted the game's modes, teams, and flashy dunks, but criticized the quality of the art and graphical technology. Author Andy Slaven appreciated the fast arcade-style gameplay, but found the visuals to be bland. The Atari Times' Dan Loosen lambasted the game's plot for absence of connection with the film, as none of the film's characters appear or are mentioned in-game and the tournament mode for its abrupt ending. He said: "Don't be fooled by the graphics, sound, control or initial thoughts of the game. Avoid this game like the plague." Writer Seanbaby placed it as number 8 in his "20 worst games ever" feature, while The Evening Tribune identified it as one of the "worst games in history".
