= Main Source (album) =

Studio album by Large Professor
- Released: September 15, 2008
- Genre: Hip hop; East Coast hip hop; underground hip hop
- Label: Gold Dust Media Distrolord
- Producer: Large Professor; Marco Polo

Large Professor chronology
1st Class (2002)	Main Source (2008)	Professor @ Large (2012)

Professional ratings
Review scores
Source	Rating
AllMusic	4/5 stars
Prefix	7/10 stars
PopMatters	7/10 stars

Main Source is the third studio album by hip hop artist Large Professor. It was released on September 15, 2008, through Gold Dust Media.

== Track listing ==
All tracks produced by Large Professor, except track 7 produced by Marco Polo.

No.	Title	Length
1.	"The Entrance"	2:15
2.	"Hot: Sizzlin', Scorchin', Torchin', Blazin'"	2:57
3.	"Maica Livin'" (feat. Killah Sha, Guardian Leep)	3:48
4.	"Pump Ya Fist Like This" (feat. Mikey D, Lotto)	3:13
5.	"Party Time"	2:45
6.	"In the Ghetto"	2:49
7.	"Hardcore Hip Hop"	3:19
8.	"Frantic Barz"	3:02
9.	"Sewin' Love"	2:58
10.	"RuDopeDapnNoyd Pt. 1" (feat. Jeru the Damaja)	1:01
11.	"RuDopeDapnNoyd Pt. 2" (feat. Big Noyd)	0:41
12.	"RuDopeDapnNoyd Pt. 3" (feat. Big Noyd)	0:48
13.	"Classic Emergency"	2:32
14.	"Rockin' Hip Hop"	3:23
15.	"Large Pro Says"	2:03
16.	"To The Meadows"	1:46
17.	"The Hardest" (feat. AZ, Styles P)	4:43
Total length:		44:02
