= Put It in Your Mouth =

Put it in Your Mouth

EP by Akinyele
- Released: August 13, 1996
- Recorded: 1995–1996
- Genre: Hip-hop; dirty rap
- Length: 21:17
- Label: Stress; Zoo; BMG 72445-11142 (first pressing) 61422-31142 (second pressing)
- Producer: Chris Forte; Frankie Cutlass; DJ Enuff; Jiv Pos; Dr. Butcher; EZ Elpee

Akinyele chronology
Vagina Diner (1993)	Put it in Your Mouth (1996)	Aktapuss (1999)

Singles from Put It in Your MOuth
- 1. "Put In in Your Mouth" Released: 1996

Professional ratings
Review scores
Source	Rating
AllMusic	2.5/5 stars

Put It in Your Mouth is the first EP released by American rapper Akinyele. featuring Kia Jeffries, it was released on August 13, 1996, on Zoo Entertainment's sub-label Stress Entertainment.

== Track listing ==
No.	Title	Length
1.	"Put It in Your Mouth"	3:22
2.	"The Robbery Song"	5:33
3.	"In the World"	3:08
4.	"Fuck Me for Free"	3:45
5.	"Thug Shit"	5:38
