= Still Rising =

Studio album by Jeru the Damaja
- Released: October 16, 2007
- Recorded: 2006–2007
- Genre: East Coast hip-hop
- Length: 56:04
- Label: Ashenafi Records
- Producers: Jeru, Luis Tineo, Sabor, Showcase

Jeru the Damaja chronology
Divine Design (2003)	Still Rising (2007)

Still Rising is the fifth studio album by Jeru the Damaja. It was released on October 16, 2007. The album cover is based on the 1968 Olympics Black Power salute.

The intro track is a direct quote from the Fullmetal Alchemist "law of Equivalent Exchange". "The Crack" is the first single of the album.

== Reception ==
Professional ratings
Review scores
Source	Rating
AllMusic	link
The Source	link

Q magazine (p. 109) - 3 stars out of 5 -- "Jeru remains a significant voice...thanks to disdain for bling and unsentimental examination of black culture."

== Track listing ==
1. "Intro"
2. "The Crack"
3. "The Prophet"
4. "Ghetto"
5. "Murdera"
6. "Quantum Leap"
7. "History 101"
8. "How Ill"
9. "Will Grow" (Interlude)
10. "Dirty Bomb"
11. "NY"
12. "Juss Buggn'"
13. "Airplay"
14. "Kick Rocks"
15. "Hold Tight"
16. "Streets" feat. Camile Velasco
