= Divine Design (album) =

Studio album by Jeru the Damaja
- Released: September 23, 2003
- Studios: Chateau D'If; Mosca One Studios
- Genre: Hip-hop
- Length: 45:15
- Label: Ashenafi
- Producers: Ed Dantez; Luis "Sabor" Tineo

Jeru the Damaja chronology
Heroz4Hire (1999)	Divine Design (2003)	Still Rising (2007)

Singles from Divine Design
- 1. "War" Released: August 12, 2003; 2. "Rap Wars / Don't Get It Twisted" Released: September 7, 2004

Professional ratings
Review scores
Source	Rating
AllHipHop	3.5/5 stars
Now	2/5 Ns
RapReviews	7.5/10
The Guardian	3/5 stars

Divine Design is the fourth studio album by American rapper Jeru the Damaja. It was released on September 23, 2003 via Ashenafi Entertainment, marking his first full-length for the label. Recording sessions took place at Chateau D'If and Mosca One Studios. Production was handled by Ed Dentez and Luis "Sabor" Tineo. It was supported by two singles: "War" and "Rap Wars" b/w "Don't Get It Twisted".

== Track listing ==
All tracks are written by Kendrick Jeru Davis, except for the tracks 3, 8 and 13 written with Luis Tineo.

No.	Title	Producer(s)	Length
1.	"Intro"	Ed Dantez	0:33
2.	"Logical"	Ed Dantez	3:26
3.	"True Skillz"	Sabor	3:17
4.	"Murda 1"	Ed Dantez	3:13
5.	"Baby Rappa"	Ed Dantez	1:09
6.	"Da Game"	Ed Dantez	3:24
7.	"War"	Ed Dantez	2:41
8.	"Praise the Lord"	Sabor	2:47
9.	"Rasta Powers"	Ed Dantez	2:54
10.	"Zilch the Pimp"	Ed Dantez	2:35
11.	"Queens"	Ed Dantez	3:52
12.	"Dirty"	Ed Dantez	3:56
13.	"Rap Wars"	Sabor	2:21
14.	"Rize"	Ed Dantez	1:44
15.	"Whatyagonnado"	Ed Dantez	3:33
16.	"Divine Design"	Ed Dantez	3:50
Total length:			45:15

== Personnel ==
- Kendrick "Jeru the Damaja" Davis – songwriter, vocals, executive producer
- Ed Dantez – producer (tracks: 1, 2, 4-7, 9-12, 14-16)
- Luis "Sabor" Tineo – songwriter & producer (tracks: 3, 8, 13), mixing
- Tony Dawsey – mastering
- Daniel Hastings – art direction, design, photography
- Pat Rivera – photography
- Deborah Binder – design assistant
