= I Juswannachill =

Single by Large Professor

from the album The LP
- B-side: "Hard!"
- Released: October 29, 1996
- Recorded: 1995
- Genre: Hip hop
- Length: 4:03
- Label: Geffen
- Songwriter: William Paul Mitchell
- Producer: Large Professor

Large Professor singles chronology
"The Mad Scientist" (1996)	"I Juswannachill" (1996)	"Rhyme Mania '99" (1999)

"I Juswannachill" is a song by American emcee and producer Large Professor, released on October 29, 1996, as the second single from his debut album The LP. The album was shelved by Geffen Records before eventually being released in 2009. The song contains a sample of "Enchanted Lady" by Milt Jackson.

== Track listing ==
A-side
No.	Title	Length
1.	"I Juswannachill" (Clean)
2.	"I Juswannachill" (LP Version)
3.	"I Juswannachill" (Instrumental)

B-side
No.	Title	Length
1.	"Hard!" (Clean)
2.	"Hard!" (LP Version)
3.	"Hard!" (Instrumental)
4.	"The Mad Scientist" (Remix)

== Charts ==
Chart (1996)	Peak position
US Hot Dance Music/Maxi-Singles Sales (Billboard)	20
US Hot R&B/Hip-Hop Songs (Billboard)	97
US Hot Rap Songs (Billboard)	26
