= State of the Art (Presto album) =

Studio album by Presto
- Released: June 17, 2008
- Genre: Hip hop
- Length: 58:19
- Label: Concrete Grooves, Distribution by Fat Beats (US), Mic Life Records (Japan)
- Producer: Presto

State of the Art is the third full-length album released by Los Angeles-based hip hop producer Chris "Presto" Douglas. The album was released worldwide on June 17, 2008, on Concrete Grooves and Distributed by Fat Beats (US) and by Mic Life Records in Japan. The album was given a "Three Mic" rating in The Source's "Record Report" (July 8) and has been well received by most critics.

The album features artists such as Sadat X (Brand Nubian), Large Professor (Main Source), O.C., Blu, T-Weaponz, LOWD, Mhax Montes (3rd Khind), Rashaan Ahmad, Wayward Saints, J Theory (3rd Khind), Fatlip (The Pharcyde), Kim Hill (former member of The Black Eyed Peas), CL Smooth (Pete Rock & CL Smooth), Dhurti Whoutr, Trek Life, IN-Q, Presto himself as well production by Large Professor Conquer Mentally (Remix).

The 12" vinyl version of State of the Art is an EP and contains six songs. There was also a limited promotional CD released with the full CD version of State of the Art with unreleased and re-released instrumentals from Presto. The Japanese release bears a different cover design and remixes not featured on US LP.

== Track listings ==
=== US CD ===
1. "Listen"
2. "Conquer Mentally" (featuring Sadat X, O.C. & Large Professor)
3. "Street Sport" (featuring Ark from T Weaponz)
4. "Pour Another Glass" (featuring Blu)
5. "On" (featuring LOWD)
6. "The Pressure" (featuring Raashan Ahmad)
7. "Higher" (featuring Mhax Montes)
8. "Altered States" (featuring Wayward Saints)
9. "Mass Quality" (featuring J Theory)
10. "What’s What" (featuring Fatlip & Kim Hill)
11. "Feel Me" (featuring T Weaponz)
12. "Part of Greatness" (featuring CL Smooth)
13. "Let It Circulate" (featuring Dhurti Whoutr)
14. "Plain Jane" (featuring Kim Hill)
15. "Go" (featuring Trek Life)
16. "Still Here" (featuring IN-Q)
17. "Outro"
18. "Conquer Mentally" (Large Professor remix)

=== EP ===
1. Conquer Mentally (featuring Sadat X / OC / Large Professor)
2. Conquer Mentally (Large Professor Remix) (feat. Sadat X / OC / Large Professor)
3. On (featuring LOWD)
4. Part of Greatness (featuring CL Smooth)
5. Street Sport (featuring Ark (of T Weaponz)
6. Pour Another Glass (featuring Blu)

== DVD ==
The compact disc version of State of the Art is sold with a video disc which contains the video for "Conquer Mentally". The video which includes ONLY the verses from Sadat X and Large Professor before it cuts to "On" featuring LOWD (track number 5 on the US release) which only plays for one verse before fading out. Other artists featured on the album can be seen on miscellaneous billboards, benches and backgrounds during the video which is mostly computer-animated. The video, created by Jake York and Marcos Ponce, has been released on YouTube.
