= Large Professor =

American rapper and producer

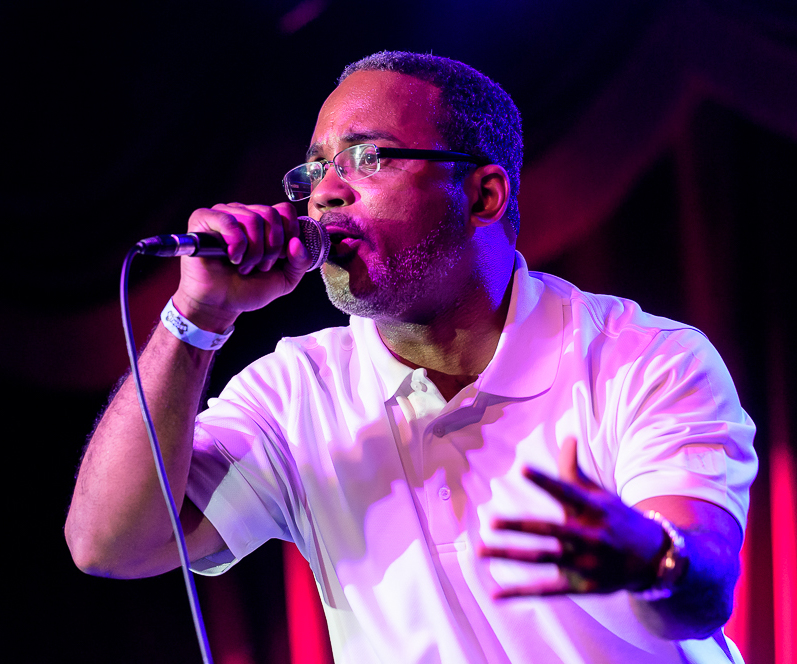
- Large Professor performing in 2016

Background information
- Also known as: Large Pro; Extra P.
- Born: William Paul Mitchell; March 21, 1972 (age 54); Manhattan, New York City, U.S.
- Origin: Queens, New York City, U.S.
- Genres: East Coast hip-hop; boom bap; jazz rap
- Occupations: Rapper; record producer; disc jockey
- Years active: 1989–present
- Labels: Gold Dust Media; Matador; Wild Pitch; EMI; Geffen; MCA
- Member of: Main Source

William Paul Mitchell (born March 21, 1972), better known by the stage name of Large Professor (also Extra P. and Large Pro), is an American rapper and record producer. Based in New York City, he is a founding member of the underground hip-hop group Main Source, and is credited with having discovered and mentored fellow New York City-based rapper Nas. About.com ranked Large Professor at No. 13 on its Top 25 Hip-Hop Producers list.

== Early life and education ==
William Paul Mitchell was born in Harlem, Manhattan, New York City, and raised in Flushing, Queens, New York City, where he attended IS 237 and John Bowne High School.

== Career ==
Large Professor started making his earliest beats with two turntables, a Casio SK-1 sampler, and pause-tape cassettes before his mentor Paul C taught him how to use an E-mu SP-1200. During his pause tape phase he noted that some of his techniques were different than those of other producers. "I was trying to catch it from a different part of the record. I would catch it from the hi-hat when dudes were just catching it from the one kick. I would catch it from the third hi-hat and be flipping it."

In 1989, he joined the group Main Source, which also included Toronto natives K-Cut and Sir Scratch. In 1990 Large produced three tracks for Eric B. & Rakim's Let the Rhythm Hit 'Em, including "In the Ghetto". To make "In the Ghetto", he sampled directly off of a cassette tape of sample ideas Paul C had made for Rakim.

Main Source recorded one album with Large called Breaking Atoms, which was released in 1991. It included hits such as "Just Hangin' Out", "Looking at the Front Door", and featured Nas' first public appearance on a track called "Live at the Barbeque", along with Akinyele and Joe Fatal. Large Professor now considers "Looking at the Front Door" one of the most emotional records of his career, later saying "That's a deep record. At that time in life, I was eighteen years old. It was a kid with a pure heart, just writing, and putting his soul out there for the world."

In 1992, their success allowed them to record "Fakin' the Funk", a track on the White Men Can't Jump motion-picture soundtrack. Because of business differences, Large and Main Source quietly parted ways and Large went on to sign with Geffen Records.

During and after his tenure with Main Source, he worked with Pete Rock & CL Smooth, and he produced a number of tracks for Nas, Busta Rhymes, Masta Ace, The X-Ecutioners, Tragedy Khadafi, Big Daddy Kane, Mobb Deep, A Tribe Called Quest, and others during the 1990s. During this time he handled a significant amount of production on several projects for other artists. In 1993 he produced Akinyele's entire Vagina Diner album, which experienced some modest commercial success at the time of its release. Though the album did well at first, The Source later wrote an article criticizing the song "I Luh Huh", in which Akinyele considers pushing his pregnant girlfriend down the stairs as a form of abortion. The ensuing backlash for the controversial lyrics hurt the album's performance. Akinyele wrote a response in the next issue defending the song and pointing out that the violent ideas in the songs are just thoughts, and he ends the song by saying "Just cause I talk this shit don't get me wrong, Yo, I still luh hur."

Large Professor also produced "Keep It Rollin'" on A Tribe Called Quest's Midnight Marauders not long after he left Main Source. This was a major moment in his career that helped him reach a new level of credibility and exposure as a solo artist.

In 1994, Large Professor produced three of the ten songs on Nas's Illmatic ("Halftime", "One Time 4 Your Mind", and "It Ain't Hard to Tell"), making him tied with DJ Premier for the most songs produced on the album. According to an interview with Busta Rhymes, the "Halftime" beat was originally intended for him. Though he liked the beat, he didn't end up using it and later regretted it after hearing "Halftime". While describing the making of the song in an interview Large Pro said, "I mean, we just wanted to put something gritty out there to the world, and those drums—that's what it was at that time. It was that gritty, muffled out, because the Hip Hop that we grew up with… We grew up with park jam tapes and things like the fidelity of these tapes." He was so instrumental in the making of Illmatic that Nas wanted to give him an executive producer credit, but he refused.

In 1996, Large Professor completed his debut solo album The LP for Geffen Records. It was promoted by the singles "The Mad Scientist" and "I Juswannachill". After several delays, the album was shelved and later released as a bootleg version in 2002. An official release of the album finally came out in 2009, thirteen years after its original intended release date.

In 2001, Large Pro produced "You're da Man" and "Rewind" for Nas's Stillmatic album. He first played Nas the beat for "You're da Man" while Nas was working on Nastradamus a few years prior. Nas chose the beat but decided to save it for a later project. Large Professor also used the same vocal sample from the chorus on the song "The Man" for his 1st Class album.

On December 22, 2002, at a concert in Toronto, the original members of Main Source performed together for the first time in nearly 10 years.

== Discography ==
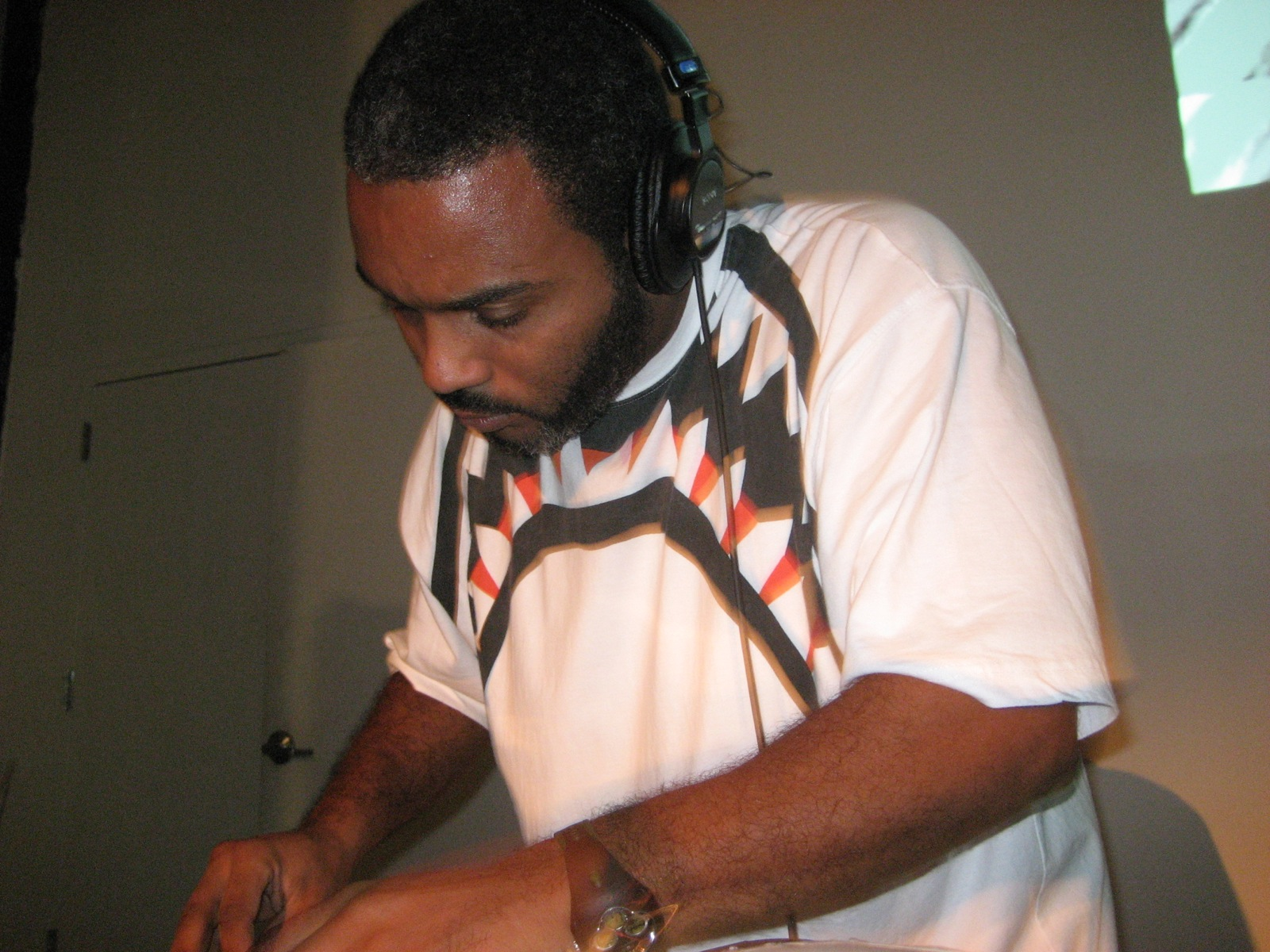
Large Professor in 2007

=== Albums ===
with Main Source

- 1991: Breaking Atoms

Solo albums

- 1996: The LP (shelved; promo release in 2002 and officially released in 2009)
- 2002: 1st Class
- 2008: Main Source
- 2012: Professor @ Large
- 2015: Re:Living

Collaboration albums

- 1993: Vagina Diner (with Akinyele)
- 2014: Mega Philosophy (with Cormega)

Instrumental albums

- 2006: Beatz Volume 1
- 2007: Beatz Volume 2
- 2022: Beatz Volume 3

=== Guest appearances ===
- 1990: "Money in the Bank" (Kool G Rap & DJ Polo; Wanted: Dead or Alive)
- --``--:: "Gots Ta Get This" (Powerule; Volume 1)
- 1992: "Apparently Nothin'" (Large Pro Mix) (Young Disciples; 12")
- 1993: "Keep It Rollin'" (A Tribe Called Quest; Midnight Marauders)
- 1994: "Stress (Remix)" (Organized Konfusion; 12")
- 1995: "To Each His Own" (INI; Lost & Found: Hip Hop Underground Soul Classics)
- 1996: "Extra Abtract Skillz" (Mad Skillz; From Where???)
- --``--:: "Actual Facts" (Lord Finesse; The Awakening)
- --``--:: "The Rap World" [Pete Rock; High School High (soundtrack)]
- 1998: "Truly Yours '98" (Pete Rock; Soul Survivor)
- --``--:: "Exotic's Raw" (Neek the Exotic; 12")
- 1999: "Dope on Plastic" (Large Professor Remix) (Rob Swift; 12")
- --``--:: "Hardcore"; "Rhyme Mania" (Neek the Exotic; 12")
- --``--:: "CT to Queens (Uncut Action) (Chris Lowe; 12"
- --``--:: "Yo Yo" (Street Smartz; Bottom Line, Vol. 1)
- 2000: "The Last Shall Be First" (Cella Dwellas; The Last Shall Be First)
- 2002: "XL" (The X-Ecutioners; Built from Scratch)
- --``--:: "Hip Hop on Wax" (Rob Swift; Sound Event)
- --``--:: "Originate" (The Beatnuts; The Originators)
- --``--:: "The Come Up" (Cormega; The True Meaning)
- --``--:: "Love Is Love" (Craig G; This Is Now!!!)
- 2004: "Sugar Ray and Hearns" (Cormega; Legal Hustle)
- --``--:: "Out da Box" (Tony Touch; The Piece Maker 2)
- 2005: "Another Friendly Game of Baseball...Xtra Innings" (Rob Swift; War Games)
- 2006: "United" (MF Grimm; American Hunger)
- 2007: "The Radar" (Marco Polo; Port Authority)
- --``--:: "Did What We Had to Do (Showoff Mix) (Statik Selektah; Spell My Name Right: The Album)
- --``--:: "The Purist" (Polyrhythm Addicts; Break Glass)
- --``--:: "Overseas with Officials" (Tommy Tee; No Studio No Time [The Wait])
- --``--:: "Front Lines" (Killa Sha; Gods Walk on Water)
- 2008: "Conquer Mentally" (Presto; State of the Art)
- --``--:: "Chill" (Deal; Changes of Atmosphere)
- --``--:: "The Hardest" (AZ; Undeniable)
- 2009: "Fans" (Masta Ace & Edo G; Arts & Entertainment)
- --``--:: "Same Old Drama" (Grand Puba; Retroactive)
- --``--:: "New Classic" (U-God; Dopium)
- --``--:: "Sweet 16s" (Satchel Page; Young Patriarch)
- --``--:: "Like This" (DJ JS-1; No Sellout: Ground Original 2)
- 2011: "Beats by the Pound" (Soulbrotha; The Connexion EP)
- --``--:: "The Quickening" (Funkoars; The Quickening)
- --``--:: "Through Good & Bad" (The Funk League; Funky As Usual)
- 2012: "Forever" (Gensu Dean; Lo-Fi Fingahz)
- --``--:: "When You Sleep" (DJ Nu-Mark; Broken Sunlight)
- --``--:: "Loco-Motive" (Nas; Life Is Good)
- --``--:: "Catch the Thrown" (Public Enemy; Most of My Heroes Still Don't Appear on No Stamp)
- --``--:: "Back & 4th Scrambler" (Yu Mamiya)
- 2013: "Built Pyramids" (N.O.R.E.; Student of the Game)
- --``--:: "Astonishing" (Marco Polo; PA2: The Director's Cut)
- 2014: "Naturally Born" (Big Noyd & Kool G Rap)
- 2015: "World Premier" (Czarface; Every Hero Needs a Villain)
- 2016: "Glorify N Praise" (Powerule; The Anomaly)
- --``--:: "Everybody Everywhere" (Mighty Mi; Everybody Everywhere)
- --``--:: "Here We Go" (Southpaw Chop)
- --``--:: "We Are One" (Loading; )
- 2017: "Come a Long Way + Remix" (Son of Sam; Cinder Hill)
- 2019 "TNT" (REMIX) (Truth; The Fight for Survival)
- 2019: "We All About" (Royal Flush; The Governor)
- --``--:: "Hard As Steel" (DJ Duke; )
- --``--:: "Everybody in the Place" (The Good People; Good for Nuthin')
- 2021: "Legendary" (Grand Daddy I.U.; The Essence)
- 2022: "Entourage"; "Attack" (Truth; For All Intents and Purposes)
- --``--:: "Talk About It" (Paul Wall; Start Finish Repeat)
- 2024: "Number One Set & Sound" (Silver Skylarks; "")
