= The LP =

Studio album by Large Professor
- Released: October 2002 (promo only); 2009 (official release)
- Recorded: May 1995 – January 1996
- Studios: Mirror Image Studios (New York City); Battery Studios (New York City); Mix B Studios (New York City)
- Genre: Hip hop
- Length: 42:50 (2002 version); 57:20 (2009 version)
- Labels: Geffen; MCA; Paul Sea GEFD-24953 PSP-006
- Producers: Large Professor; Toney Rome; Vandamator

Large Professor chronology
Breaking Atoms (with Main Source) (1991)	The LP (2002)	1st Class (2002)

Alternative Cover
- 2009 release

Singles from The LP
- 1. "The Mad Scientist" Released: April 2, 1996; 2. "I Juswannachill" Released: October 29, 1996

Professional ratings
Review scores
Source	Rating
AllMusic	4/5 stars
HipHopDX	4.5/5 stars

The LP is the debut solo album of American emcee and producer Large Professor. It was released officially in 2009, after being shelved in 1996 by Geffen Records after several delays. "The Mad Scientist" and "I Juswannachill" were released as singles prior to the anticipated release, and a bootleg was circulated. In 2002, Large Professor regained the rights to the recordings and released the album as a promo-only CD.

== 2002 version ==
No.	Title	Length
1.	"Sunrise"	2:41
2.	"One Plus One (feat. Nas)"	2:50
3.	"Hard"	3:38
4.	"Spacey"	3:04
5.	"For My People"	3:20
6.	"Hungry"	2:45
7.	"Get Off the Bullshit"	3:44
8.	"Funky 2 Listen 2"	2:59
9.	"Dancing Girl"	3:47
10.	"Have Fun"	3:11
11.	"I Juswannachill"	3:36
12.	"The Mad Scientist"	3:39

== 2009 version ==
No.	Title	Length
1.	"Intro"	1:02
2.	"That Bullshit"	3:42
3.	"Hungry"	2:43
4.	"I Juswanna Chill"	3:23
5.	"Funky 2 Listen 2"	2:54
6.	"Mad Scientist"	4:22
7.	"Hard"	3:50
8.	"One Plus One" (feat Nas)	2:48
9.	"The LP"	3:17
10.	"Dancin' Girl" (feat. Len X's Ten)	3:45
11.	"Large Pro: Verbs"	2:36
12.	"Havin' Fun"	3:25
13.	"Spacy" (feat. Cee Lowe and Vandamator)	2:59
14.	"Amaman"	3:57
15.	"Queens Lounge"	3:16
16.	"Bowne"	3:53
17.	"Big Willie"	3:38
18.	"Outro"	1:45
Total length:		57:27
