= Come Clean (Jeru the Damaja song) =

Single by Jeru the Damaja

from the album The Sun Rises in the East
- Released: October 26, 1993
- Studio: D&D Recording Studio (New York City)
- Genre: East Coast hip hop
- Length: 4:57
- Label: Payday; FFRR
- Songwriters: Kendrick Jeru Davis; Kirk Jones; Shelly Manne; Chris E. Martin; Fred Scruggs; Tyrone Taylor
- Producer: DJ Premier

Jeru the Damaja singles chronology
"Come Clean" (1993)	"D. Original" (1994)

Music video
- "Come Clean" on YouTube

"Come Clean" is a song by American rapper Jeru the Damaja from his debut album, The Sun Rises in the East (1994). The song appeared in many compilation albums, and was featured prominently in the film Morris from America, and season 3, episode 6 of Narcos.

== Charts ==
=== Weekly charts ===
Chart (1994)	Peak position
US Billboard Hot 100	88
US Hot R&B Singles (Billboard)	53
US Hot Rap Singles (Billboard)	10
US Hot Dance Music/Maxi-Singles Sales (Billboard)	6

=== Year-end charts ===
Chart (1994)	Position
US Maxi-Singles Sales (Billboard)	37

== Personnel ==
- Design - Peace Pype
- Engineer - Eddie Sancho
- Engineer [Assistant] - Louis Tineo
- Executive Producer - DJ Premier, Guru
- Mastered By - Howie Weinberg
- Other [A&R Coordination] - Dino Delvaille
- Photography - Chi Modu
- Producer - DJ Premier
- Written-By - C. Martin, F. Scruggs, K.J. Davis, K. Jones, C. Parker, T. Taylor
