= Wrath of the Math =

Studio album by Jeru the Damaja
- Released: October 15, 1996
- Recorded: 1995–1996
- Genre: East Coast hip-hop
- Length: 51:47
- Labels: Payday; FFRR; Polygram
- Producer: DJ Premier

Jeru the Damaja chronology
The Sun Rises in the East (1994)	Wrath of the Math (1996)	Heroz4Hire (1999)

Singles from Wrath of the Math
- 1. "Ya Playin' Yaself" Released: September 23, 1996; 2. "Me or the Papes" Released: March 11, 1997

Wrath of the Math is the second album by the hip-hop artist Jeru the Damaja. The album spawned the 2 singles "Ya Playin' Yaself" and "Me or the Papes". The album peaked at number 3 on the US Top R&B/Hip Hop Albums, and number 35 on the US Billboard 200.

== Background ==
The album was produced by DJ Premier and continues the themes of Afrocentricity, preserving hip-hop culture, and more about the harms of materialism that were discussed on The Sun Rises in the East. In the album's liner notes, Jeru the Damaja declares: "This album was created to SAVE hip-hop and the minds of the people who listen to it."

One significant track that intends to uphold Jeru's vision of hip-hop is "One Day", where he tells a story of Puff Daddy, Foxy Brown and Bad Boy Records kidnapping somebody named Hip-Hop. The Notorious B.I.G. took offense to the song, as he was signed to Bad Boy Records, and was closely connected with Puff Daddy and Foxy Brown. Biggie retaliated by throwing subtle jabs at Jeru in the song "Kick in the Door" (which was aimed at other rap artists as well). The track "Me or the Papes" contains aim for Puff Daddy, Jeru stating, "My name ain't Puff, I ain't got loot to waste", to which Puff Daddy did not respond.

It contains many tracks that are sequels to songs on Jeru's first album such as "Revenge of the Prophet (Part 5)", "Me or the Papes" and "Physical Stamina", featuring Afu-Ra, the one guest emcee, as he was on Jeru's first album.

== Critical reception ==
Professional ratings
Review scores
Source	Rating
AllMusic	4.5/5 stars
Christgau's Consumer Guide	(1-star Honorable Mention)
Entertainment Weekly	B+
Muzik	5/5 stars
RapReviews	9/10
The Source	3/5 stars

The album was well-received, but was not as critically acclaimed as his first album. John Bush of AllMusic was one of the few critics who felt that it was just as strong as Jeru's first album. Entertainment Weekly: "Combined with DJ Premier's head-bobbing minimalist funk, Jeru tells it like it is like no other." Vibe: "Armed with a prophet's sense of social responsibility, Webster's vocab, and the best beats in the business.... Jeru's at his best...when he fights playa-ism with its most potent weapon: sharply visual, action-packed narrative." The Source: Good—"Returning with an unabashed intolerance for the artistic moves of some well-known rap figures...Jeru the Damaja proves that his musical compositions are too mentally stimulating to be ignored." Melody Maker: Ranked No. 43 on Melody Maker's 1996 list of Albums of the Year.

== Track listing ==
- All songs produced by DJ Premier

#	Title	Songwriters	Performer (s)
1	"Wrath of the Math"	K.J. Davis, C. Martin	*Interlude*
2	"Tha Frustrated Nigga" (previously featured on Pump Ya Fist (Hip Hop Inspired by the Black Panthers))	K.J. Davis, C. Martin	Jeru the Damaja
3	"Black Cowboys"	K.J. Davis, C. Martin	Jeru the Damaja
4	"Tha Bullshit"	K.J. Davis, C. Martin	Jeru the Damaja
5	"Whatever"	K.J. Davis, C. Martin, M. Small Jr.	Jeru the Damaja
6	"Physical Stamina"	K.J. Davis, A. Phillips, C. Martin	Jeru the Damaja, Afu-Ra
7	"One Day"	K.J. Davis, C. Martin	Jeru the Damaja
8	"Revenge of the Prophet (Part 5)"	K.J. Davis, C. Martin	Jeru the Damaja
9	"Scientifical Madness"	K.J. Davis, C. Martin	Jeru the Damaja
10	"Not the Average"	K.J. Davis, C. Martin	Jeru the Damaja
11	"Me or the Papes"	K.J. Davis, C. Martin	Jeru the Damaja
12	"How I'm Livin'"	K.J. Davis, C. Martin	Jeru the Damaja
13	"Too Perverted"	K.J. Davis, C. Martin	Jeru the Damaja
14	"Ya Playin' Yaself"	K.J. Davis, C. Martin	Jeru the Damaja
15	"Invasion" (previously featured on New Jersey Drive, Vol. 2)	K.J. Davis, C. Martin, C. Mayfield	Jeru the Damaja

== Charts ==
Chart (1996)	Peak position
UK Albums (Official Charts)	79
US Billboard 200	35
US Top R&B/Hip-Hop Albums (Billboard)	3

== Singles chart positions ==
Year	Song	Chart positions			
Year	Song	Billboard Hot 100	Hot R&B/ Hip-Hop Singles & Tracks	Hot Rap Singles	Hot Dance Music/ Maxi-Singles Sales
1996	"Ya Playin' Yaself"	-	57	20	6
1996	"One Day"	-	89	1	-
1997	"Me or the Papes"	99	78	2	26
