= D. Original =

Single by Jeru the Damaja

from the album The Sun Rises in the East
- Released: May 3, 1994
- Recorded: 1993
- Genre: Hip hop
- Length: 3:36
- Label: Payday/ffrr
- Songwriter(s): Kendrick Davis; Christopher Martin
- Producer(s): DJ Premier

Jeru the Damaja singles chronology
"Come Clean" (1993)	"D. Original" (1994)	"You Can't Stop the Prophet" (1994)

"D. Original" is a song co-written and performed by American hip hop musician Jeru the Damaja, issued as the second single from his debut studio album The Sun Rises in the East. In 1994, the song peaked at #22 on the Billboard rap chart but it fared better on the dance chart, where it peaked at #6.

"D. Original" contains samples of "Give It to You" by Upp; "We Write the Songs" by Marley Marl, Heavy D and Biz Markie; and "I'm the Man" by Gang Starr. Since the song's release, it has been sampled in "Expanding Man" by Dilated Peoples; "Nasty As I Wanna Be" by Dirt Nasty; "B-Boys Revenge 96 Porkopolis Turntable Jazz" by Mr. Dibbs; and "Streetwise" by Termanology.

== Music video ==
The official music video for "D. Original" was directed by Lionel C. Martin.

== Chart positions ==
Chart (1994)	Peak position
US Hot Dance Music/Maxi-Singles Sales (Billboard)	6
US Hot Rap Singles (Billboard)	22
US Hot R&B/Hip-Hop Singles & Tracks (Billboard)	74
