= Anakonda =

Studio album by Akinyele
- Released: July 10, 2001
- Recorded: 2001
- Genre: Hip-Hop, dirty rap
- Label: Koch
- Producer: Lord Finesse, Earl Thomas, Tom Brown

Akinyele chronology
Aktapuss (1999)	Anakonda (2001)	Live at the Barbecue: Unreleased Hits (2004)

Anakonda is the final studio album by American rapper Akinyele. It was released in 2001 on Koch Records. Anakonda proved to be the least successful of Akinyele's albums, not making it to any of the Billboard charts.

== Critical reception ==
Professional ratings
Review scores
Source	Rating
AllMusic	2.5/5 stars
The Encyclopedia of Popular Music	3/5 stars
HipHopDX	2.5/5
RapReviews	5/10

Exclaim! wrote that "undoubtedly the intention was to shock, but the mediocre skills and pedestrian beats instead induce rolling of the eyes." Entertainment Weekly thought that "the veteran Queens rapper again spits out the raunchiest raps north of Miami’s 2 Live Crew."

USA Today listed Anakonda as the fifth worst R&B album of 2001, writing: "The explicit rapper's raunchy antics used to make you laugh or cringe. But at this point, there are no surprises left."

== Track listing ==
1. "Gangsters" (Akinyele Adams, Earl Thomas) - 3:39
2. "I Like" (Akinyele Adams, Sandra Clough, Thomas) - 4:09
3. "Guns Bust" (Akinyele Adams, Chris Moore, William Young) - 3:53
4. "Do You Wanna?" (Akinyele Adams, Moore) - 4:26
5. "Love My Bitch" (Akinyele Adams, Lord Finesse) - 3:13
6. "Eat Pussy" (Akinyele Adams, Christine McClean, Andre Venable) - 3:25
7. "I'll Kill 4 You" (Akinyele Adams, Tom Hill) - 2:31
8. "Pimps and Hoes" (Akinyele Adams, Armstead, Lou Brown, Thomas) - 5:05
9. "Do You Even" (Akinyele Adams, Lou Brown, Mahoghony) - 2:21
10. "Problems" (Akinyele Adams, Eric Brown, Mobutu "Boo" Evans) - 4:27
11. "What" (Akinyele Adams, Moore) - 3:09
12. "The Rhyme" (Akinyele Adams, McClean, Venable) - 4:13

== Personnel ==
- Akinyele – vocals
- Louis Brown – vocals
- Tom Hill – producer
- Lord Finesse – producer
- Jessica Rosenblum – executive producer
- Earl Thomas – producer
