= The Sun Rises in the East =

Studio album by Jeru the Damaja
- Released: May 24, 1994
- Recorded: 1993–1994
- Studios: D&D (Manhattan, New York City)
- Genre: East Coast hip-hop
- Length: 39:33
- Labels: Payday; FFRR
- Producer: DJ Premier

Jeru the Damaja chronology
The Sun Rises in the East (1994)	Wrath of the Math (1996)

Singles from The Sun Rises in the East
- 1. "Come Clean" Released: October 26, 1993; 2. "D. Original" Released: May 3, 1994

The Sun Rises in the East is the debut album by American rapper Jeru the Damaja, released May 24, 1994, on Payday Records. It was produced by DJ Premier. The album features fellow Gang Starr Foundation member Afu-Ra. The album cover depicts the World Trade Center on fire only one year after the 1993 bombing of the North Tower.

The Sun Rises in the East was well received by most music critics upon its release. The album has been considered by critics to be Jeru the Damaja's best work.

"You Can't Stop the Prophet" is featured on the soundtrack of the video game NBA 2K16. The soundtrack was partially curated by DJ Premier.

== Critical reception ==
Professional ratings
Review scores
Source	Rating
AllMusic	5/5 stars
Christgau's Consumer Guide	(1-star Honorable Mention)
Entertainment Weekly	B
The Indianapolis Star	3/4 stars
NME	7/10
Pittsburgh Post-Gazette	3.5/4 stars
RapReviews	10/10
The Source	4/5 stars

Melody Maker named The Sun Rises in the East "bloody essential", calling it "hypnotic and chilling as a blues party on Pluto" and "another step forward for hip hop." NME said that "Jeru is more original than most [rappers]", while The Source remarked that "the music both contrasts and complements his disjointed flow and deep poetical lyricism." The Indianapolis Star wrote, "Skeletal, basic and tough, this rap disc ... is exciting for its directness, lacking only in its failure to take full hold of its theme promoting Brooklyn as the mecca of rap knowledge."

In 2022, Rolling Stone placed it at number 155 on their list of the 200 Greatest Hip-Hop Albums of All Time. The magazine's writer Joe Gross said, "Jeru's debut is the platonic ideal of a certain kind of golden age hip-hop album: big beats, righteous lyrics, extremely serious vibe."

== Track listing ==
- All songs produced by DJ Premier

#	Title	Length	Songwriters
1	"Intro (Life)"	0:50	K.J. Davis, C. Martin
2	"D. Original"	3:36	K.J. Davis, C. Martin
3	"Brooklyn Took It"	3:24	K.J. Davis, C. Martin
4	"Perverted Monks in tha House (Skit)"	1:15	K.J. Davis, C. Martin, A. Phillip, W. Garfield, C. Clay
5	"Mental Stamina" (featuring Afu-Ra)	2:21	K.J. Davis, C. Martin
6	"Da Bichez"	3:52	*Uncredited*
7	"You Can't Stop the Prophet"	3:53	K.J. Davis, C. Martin
8	"Perverted Monks in tha House (Theme)"	1:02	*Uncredited*
9	"Ain't the Devil Happy"	3:45	K.J. Davis, C. Martin
10	"My Mind Spray"	3:45	K.J. Davis, C. Martin, B. James
11	"Come Clean"	4:57	K.J. Davis, C. Martin, C. Parker, F. Scruggs, K. Jones, T. Taylor
12	"Jungle Music"	3:51	*Uncredited*
13	"Statik"	3:07	K.J. Davis, C. Martin

== Singles ==
Single information
"Come Clean"
- Released: October 21, 1993
- B-side:
"D. Original"
- Released: January 29, 1994
- B-side:
"You Can't Stop the Prophet"
- Released: April 6, 1994
- B-side:

== Charts ==
=== Weekly charts ===
Chart (1994)	Peak position
US Billboard 200	36
US Top R&B/Hip-Hop Albums (Billboard)	5

=== Year-end charts ===
Chart (1994)	Position
US Top R&B/Hip-Hop Albums (Billboard)	84

=== Singles ===
Year	Song	Chart positions			
Year	Song	Billboard Hot 100	Hot R&B/Hip-Hop Singles & Tracks	Hot Rap Singles	Hot Dance Music/Maxi-Singles Sales
1993	"Come Clean"	88	53	10	6
1994	"D. Original"	-	74	22	6
1994	"You Can't Stop the Prophet"	-	-	45	19
