= Fakin' the Funk =

Single by Main Source

from the album White Men Can't Jump
- Released: May 19, 1992
- Recorded: 1992
- Genre: Hip hop
- Length: 3:41
- Label: Wild Pitch/EMI
- Songwriters: William Mitchell, Kevin McKenzie, Shawn McKenzie
- Producer: Main Source

Main Source singles chronology
"Peace Is Not the Word to Play" (1991)	"Fakin' the Funk" (1992)	"What You Need" (1993)

"Fakin' the Funk" is a single by hip hop group Main Source, released on May 19, 1992, from the soundtrack White Men Can't Jump. It features an uncredited guest appearance by rapper Neek the Exotic and contains a sample of "Magic Shoes" by The Main Ingredient. The song's lyrics were directed at hip hop acts who were perceived to be selling out. It peaked at number one on Billboard's Hot Rap Songs chart. In the film White Men Can't Jump, a censored version of the song was played.

== Track listing ==
=== CD single ===
1. "Fakin' the Funk" (Remix)
2. "Fakin' the Funk" (Instrumental)

== Charts ==
Chart (1992)	Peak position
US Hot Rap Songs (Billboard)	1
