= Re:Living =

Studio album by Large Professor
- Released: June 9, 2015
- Genre: Hip hop
- Length: 32:19
- Label: Fat Beats Distrolord
- Producer: Large Professor; J-Love

Large Professor chronology
Professor @ Large (2012)	Re:Living (2015)

Professional ratings
Review scores
Source	Rating
RapReviews	5.5/10

Re:Living is the fifth studio album by American hip hop artist Large Professor. It was released on June 9, 2015, on Fat Beats Records.

== Track listing ==
All songs produced by Large Professor, except track 9 produced by J-Love and co-produced by Large Professor.

No.	Title	Length
1.	"Re:Living"	2:41
2.	"Dreams Don't Die"	2:45
3.	"Opulence"	3:10
4.	"Earn"	2:41
5.	"Off Yo Azz on Yo Feet"	3:03
6.	"In the Scrolls" (feat. G-Wiz)	2:39
7.	"Own World" (feat. Fortune)	3:04
8.	"Sophia Yo"	2:21
9.	"New Train Ole Route"	3:06
10.	"Industry RMX 2" (feat. Inspectah Deck, Cormega, Roc Marciano, Sadat X & Lord Jamar)	4:29
11.	"NDN"	2:20
