= Vagina Diner =

Studio album by Akinyele
- Released: 1993
- Studios: Power Play, New York City, New York
- Genres: Hip-hop, dirty rap
- Length: 41:27
- Label: Interscope • Atlantic
- Producer: Large Professor

Akinyele chronology
Vagina Diner (1993)	Put It in Your Mouth (1996)

Vagina Diner is the debut studio album by American rapper Akinyele, released on Interscope Records in 1993. The album's single was "Ak Ha Ha! Ak Hoo Hoo?" The album did not receive much promotional backing from Interscope, but did manage to become a hit on college radio.

== Critical reception ==
Professional ratings
Review scores
Source	Rating
AllMusic	3/5 stars
The Encyclopedia of Popular Music	3/5 stars
MusicHound R&B: The Essential Album Guide	1.5/5 stars
RapReviews	8.5/10
The Source	3.5/5 stars

In a retrospective review, Spin wrote that Akinyele is "a gritty, X-rated joker with a uniquely bipolar flow—his set-ups are nimble wordplay, his punchlines are delivered in a low Oscar the Grouch croak."

== Track listing ==
- All songs produced by Large Professor.

No.	Title	Length
1.	"Worldwide"	4:01
2.	"Outta State"	4:25
3.	"Ak Ha Ha! Ak Hoo Hoo?"	2:50
4.	"Dear Diary"	3:04
5.	"Bags Packed"	3:36
6.	"The Bomb"	4:45
7.	"Beat"	0:26
8.	"Checkmate"	4:28
9.	"I Luh Hur"	2:42
10.	"You Know My Style"	0:20
11.	"Exercise"	3:22
12.	"No Exit"	3:54
13.	"30 Days"	3:34

== Personnel ==
- Akinyele – vocals
- Large Professor – production
- Rob Swift – scratches
- Matt Noble – engineering
- Anton Pushansky – engineering
- Rob Sutton – engineering
- Dino Zervous – engineering
- Tar – photography
- The Pizz – illustration
- Kimberly Holt – art direction, design

== Charts ==
Chart	Peak position
US Top R&B/Hip-Hop Albums (Billboard)	83
