= Afu-Ra =

American rapper (born 1974)

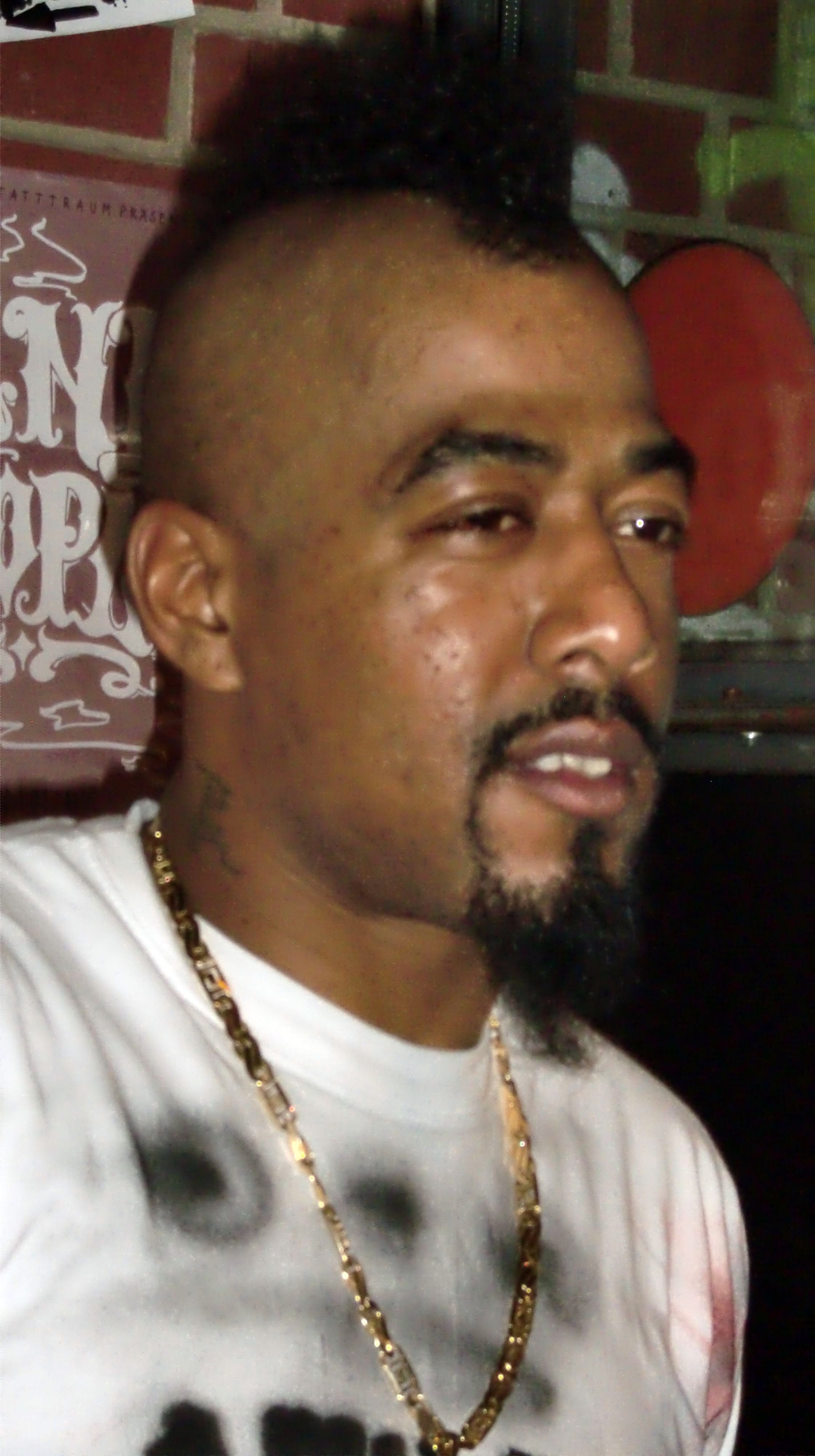
- Afu-Ra in 2012

Background information
- Born: Aaron Ocosice Phillip; January 31, 1974 (age 52)
- Origin: Brooklyn, New York City, U.S.
- Genres: Hip hop
- Years active: 1994–present
- Labels: Gee Street; V2; BMG; MNRK; Reggae Lounge; Decon Inc.
- Member of: Gang Starr Foundation

Aaron Ocosice Phillip (born January 31, 1974), known professionally as Afu-Ra, is an American rapper. A member of the Gang Starr Foundation, he has worked closely with its members, including Gang Starr, Jeru the Damaja, Big Shug and Group Home.

== Career ==
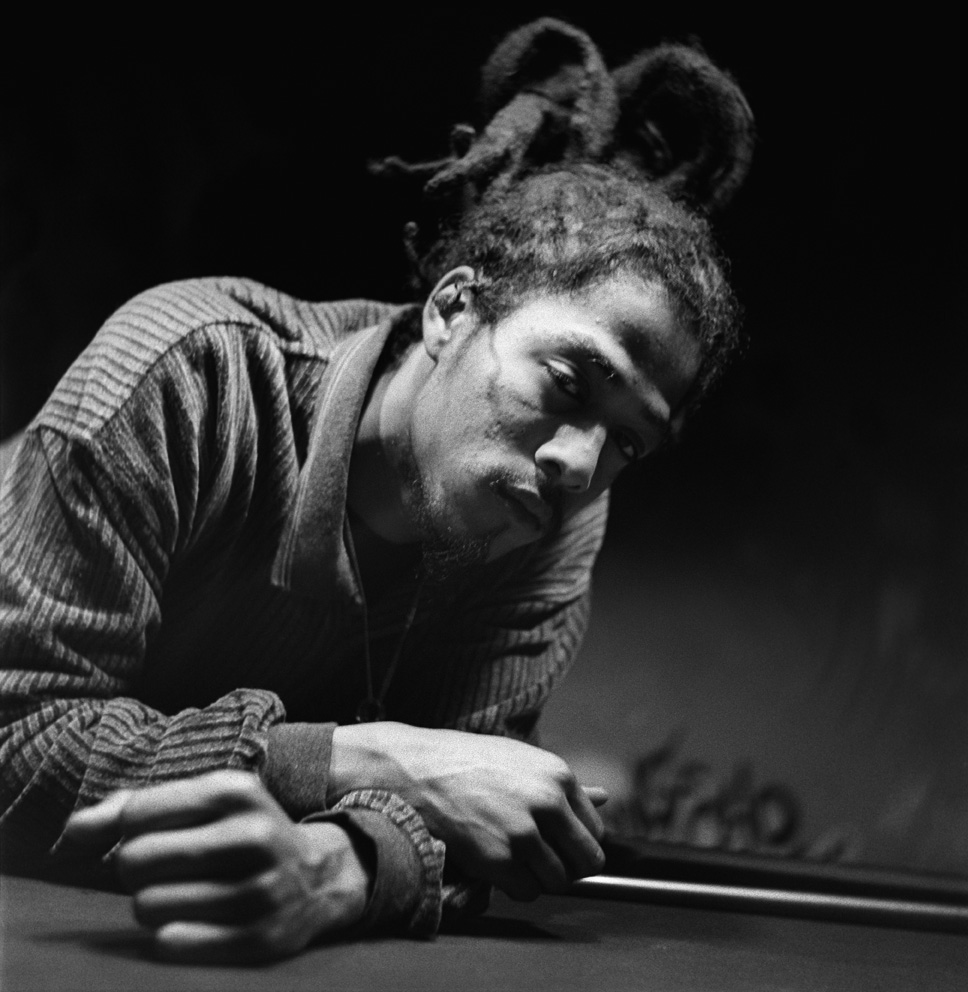
Afu-Ra in 2000

Afu-Ra grew up in Brooklyn with frequent collaborator Jeru the Damaja.

Afu-Ra's first studio appearance was on Jeru's debut studio album The Sun Rises in the East, on the song "Mental Stamina". He made another appearance on Jeru's second studio album Wrath of the Math, on the track "Physical Stamina", in 1996. Afu's debut single, "Whirlwind Thru Cities", was released in 1998, reaching the top 20 on Billboard's Hot Rap Singles chart. In 1999, he released his second single, "Defeat" b/w "Mortal Kombat". His debut album, Body of the Life Force, was released in October 2000. The album featured production from DJ Premier, DJ Muggs, True Master and Da Beatminerz. Guests included Wu-Tang Clan's GZA and Masta Killa, M.O.P., Ky-Mani Marley, and the Cocoa Brovaz. The album peaked at 183 on the Billboard 200, 13 on the independent chart, and 42 on hip hop.

Afu has released his second studio album Life Force Radio in May 2002 on MNRK, featuring production from DJ Premier, True Master, Easy Mo Bee, Domingo and Ayatollah. Guests included Guru, Big Daddy Kane, RZA, and Teena Marie. The album was slightly less successful, peaking at 184 on the Billboard 200, 17 on the independent album chart, though 29 on hip hop.

In 2004, he released a compilation album titled Afu-Ra presents Perverted Monks, followed by a studio album in 2005, titled State of the Arts on Decon Records. The latter featured production by DJ Premier and Bronze Nazareth and guest vocals from Masta Killa, Royce da 5'9", and Gentleman. In 2012, he independently released Body of the Life Force 2. In 2020 he released the Album "Urban Chemistry" with features of Big Shug, Mann, Lord Kossity, Sizzla etc.

== Discography ==
Album information
Body of the Life Force
- Released: October 24, 2000
- Billboard 200 chart position: 183
- R&B/Hip-Hop chart position: 42
- Singles: "Whirlwind Thru Cities", "Defeat"/"Mortal Kombat", "Equality"/"Bring it Right", "Big Acts, Little Acts", "D&D Soundclash"
Life Force Radio
- Released: May 21, 2002
- Billboard 200 chart position: 184
- R&B/Hip-Hop chart position: 29
- Singles: "Crossfire"/"Lyrical Monster", "Scat Man"/"Stick Up"
Perverted Monks
- Released: 2004
State of the Arts
- Released: June 14, 2005
- Billboard 200 chart position: -
- R&B/Hip-Hop chart position: -
- Singles: "Poisonous Taoist"/"Sucka Free", "God of Rap"/"Pusha", "Why Cry" (feat. Gentleman)
Body of the Life Force 2
- Released: November 26, 2012
- Billboard 200 chart position: -
- R&B/Hip-Hop chart position: -
