= White Men Can't Jump =

1992 film directed by Ron Shelton

- Theatrical release poster
- Directed by: Ron Shelton
- Written by: Ron Shelton
- Produced by: David V. Lester; Don Miller; Michelle Rappaport
- Starring: Wesley Snipes; Woody Harrelson; Rosie Perez
- Cinematography: Russell Boyd
- Edited by: Kimberly Ray; Paul Seydor
- Music by: Bennie Wallace
- Distributed by: 20th Century Fox
- Release date: March 27, 1992
- Running time: 115 minutes
- Country: United States
- Language: English
- Budget: $31 million
- Box office: $90.8 million

White Men Can't Jump is a 1992 American sports comedy film written and directed by Ron Shelton. It stars Wesley Snipes and Woody Harrelson as streetball hustlers. The film was released in the United States on March 27, 1992, by 20th Century Fox.

The film received generally positive reviews from critics and was a box office success. A loose video game adaptation was released in 1995, while a remake film was released in 2023.

== Plot ==
Billy Hoyle is a former Tulane Green Wave basketball player who makes his living by hustling streetballers who assume he cannot play well because he is white. Sidney Deane is a talented but cocky player who is twice beaten by Billy.

Billy and his live-in girlfriend, Gloria Clemente, are on the run from the Stucci brothers, mobsters to whom he owes a gambling debt. Gloria's goal is to be a contestant on the television game show Jeopardy! and make a fortune. Sidney wants to buy a house for his family outside the rough Baldwin Village neighborhood. He proposes a business partnership with Billy in which they will hustle other players by setting them up to pick Billy as Sidney's teammate. At first, their system is very successful, but when they unexpectedly lose a game, it turns out that Sidney had double-crossed Billy by deliberately playing badly to avenge his earlier loss to him.

Gloria and Billy go to Sidney's apartment and appeal to his wife, Rhonda. The women agree to share the money, provided Sidney and Billy team up for a major two-on-two outdoor tournament. Despite their constant bickering, Sidney and Billy win the grand prize of $5,000, largely due to Billy's ability to disrupt his opponents' concentration. Sidney is pleased with the outcome, but he cannot help mocking Billy about his inability to slam dunk.

Billy insists that he can indeed dunk and bets his share of the $5,000 on his ability to dunk but fails. When he tells Gloria, she leaves him. Desperate to get her back, Billy goes to Sidney for help. Sidney has a friend who works as a security guard at the TV studio that produces Jeopardy! His friend agrees to use his connections to get her on the show if Billy can sink a hook shot from beyond the half-court line, which he does. On Jeopardy!, Gloria initially stumbles over a sports question but makes a comeback with a pet topic, "Foods That Begin With the Letter Q". She wins $14,100 on her first episode.

Billy sings Gloria a song he has composed and wins her back. As Billy and Gloria discuss their future, Sidney approaches Billy for help: His apartment was burglarized and his winnings were stolen. Gloria is expecting Billy to get a steady job, but Sidney informs him that two hoops legends of the L.A. streetball scene, "The King" and "The Duck", are playing downtown. Sidney asks Billy to partner with him to play against them. Billy agrees, offering to gamble his share of Gloria's take ($2000, which Gloria gave to him to support him finding a job, for example to buy clothes for interviews). Gloria warns that if Billy gambles with her money, they are through, even if he and Sidney win. Billy sides with Sidney, feeling he must honor the obligation he owes him for getting Gloria on Jeopardy!. Gloria respectfully breaks up with Billy due to this situation. Billy and Sidney play against King and Duck and prevail, the winning point coming when Sidney lobs an "alley-oop" pass to Billy, who dunks it.

Billy returns home and is crushed to find that Gloria has in fact left him. The mobsters who are after Billy find him, and he pays his debts. Sidney remarks that Billy and Gloria may be better off without each other. Finished with basketball hustling, Billy asks Sidney if he could offer him a job at his construction company, to which Sidney agrees. The film ends as Billy and Sidney launch into another basketball argument and return to the court where they first met to play a one-on-one game, this time as friends.

== Cast ==
- Wesley Snipes as Sidney "Syd" Deane
- Woody Harrelson as Billy Hoyle
- Rosie Perez as Gloria Clemente
- Tyra Ferrell as Rhonda Deane
- Cylk Cozart as Robert
- Kadeem Hardison as Junior
- John Marshall Jones as Walter
- Ernest Harden Jr. as George
- Nigel Miguel as Dwight "The Flight" McGhee
- Duane Martin as Willie Lewis
- Freeman Williams as Duck Johnson
- Louis Price as Eddie "The King" Faroo
- Marques Johnson as Raymond
- Eloy Casados as Tony Stucci
- Bill Henderson, Sonny Craver & Jon Hendricks as the Venice Beach Boys
- Alex Trebek as Himself
- Allan Malamud as Rocket Scientist

== Production ==
Ron Shelton conceived of the idea for the film while he was working on a script for another movie, Blue Chips. He had been writing a scene that takes place on a playground and became interested in the "wonderful craziness that goes on behind those chain link fences". Shelton drew on his experiences as a former college basketball star and a regular at YMCA pickup games in Hollywood for the script. Shelton said he "love[d] the theater of [basketball], the posturing and the rituals." Shelton put aside work on the Blue Chips script to concentrate on White Men Can’t Jump.

Bob Lanier, Detroit Pistons and Milwaukee Bucks player and Hall of Famer, was hired as the basketball coach for the film. Woody Harrelson, Wesley Snipes, and other cast members attended an intensive month-long basketball camp to prepare for filming. Lanier was impressed with Harrelson and Snipes, and believed both of them had the skill of Division II college players. During camp and film production, Lanier noted that between the two of them, Harrelson actually was the better player.

The character of Gloria was originally conceived as "an upper-class white girl at Smith or Barnard who runs away with a bad boy." However, actress Rosie Perez left a lasting impression on Shelton when she said she could not audition because she was "having a bad hair day", and he reconfigured the character to cast her.

Marques Johnson has a supporting role as Raymond, who loses a game to Snipes and Harrelson. Johnson was a star player for UCLA's 1974–75 national championship team coached by John Wooden and later played for the NBA's Bucks, Clippers, and Warriors. According to Johnson, former NBA player Reggie Harding was the inspiration for the character of Raymond.

Freeman Williams, who played "Duck" Johnson, also had a distinguished NBA career, playing for the Clippers, Jazz, and Bullets from 1978 to 1986.

NBA player Gary Payton made an uncredited appearance as an unidentified street baller.

== Music ==
Two soundtracks were released by Capitol Records. The first soundtrack using the film title was released on March 24, 1992, and consisted mostly of R&B. The soundtrack peaked at number 92 on the Billboard 200 and number 48 on the Top R&B/Hip-Hop Albums chart and features the single "White Men Can't Jump" by Riff, which peaked at number 90 on the Billboard Hot 100. The accompanying music video featured Harrelson, Snipes and Perez. AllMusic rated it two and a half out of five stars.

The second album, titled White Men Can't Rap, was released on April 7, 1992, and consisted entirely of hip hop. It reached number 79 on the Billboard Top R&B/Hip-Hop Albums chart. AllMusic rated it two out of five stars. The only single coming out of the EP soundtrack was "Fakin' the Funk" by Main Source.

White Men Can't Jump soundtrack

1. "White Men Can't Jump"- 3:35 (Riff)
2. "Sympin" (Radio Remix)- 5:02 (Boyz II Men)
3. "The Hook"- 3:43 (Queen Latifah)
4. "Let Me Make It Up to You Tonight"- 4:30 (Jody Watley)
5. "Don't Ever Let 'Em See You Sweat"- 4:19 (Go West)
6. "I'm Going Up"- 3:40 (BeBe & CeCe)
7. "Can You Come Out and Play"- 3:45 (The O'Jays)
8. "Watch Me Do My Thang"- 3:58 (Lipstick)
9. "If I Lose"- 4:04 (Aretha Franklin)
10. "Jump for It"- 4:08 (Jesse Johnson)
11. "Just a Closer Walk With Thee"- 3:07 (Venice Beach Boys)

White Men Can't Rap

1. "A to the K" – 3:20 (Cypress Hill)
2. "Area Code 213" – 4:28 (Boo-Yaa T.R.I.B.E.)
3. "Fakin' the Funk" – 3:30 (Main Source)
4. "Freezin' Em" – 5:14 (Level III)
5. "How to Act" – 3:14 (College Boyz)
6. "Now You're Mine" – 2:55 (Gang Starr)

== Reception ==
=== Box office ===
White Men Can't Jump grossed $14,711,124 in 1,923 theaters in its opening weekend, with a total gross of $76,253,806 in the U.S. and $90,753,806 worldwide and was the 16th highest-grossing movie of 1992.

=== Critical response ===
The film received positive reviews. On review aggregator Rotten Tomatoes, the film holds an approval rating of 75% based on 106 reviews, with an average score of 6.40/10. The website's critical consensus reads, "White Men Can't Jump provides a fresh take on the sports comedy genre, with a clever script and a charismatic trio of leads." On Metacritic, the film received a score of 65 based on 28 reviews, indicating "generally favorable reviews".

Roger Ebert of the Chicago Sun-Times gave the film three and a half stars, saying it was "not simply a basketball movie", praising Ron Shelton for "knowing his characters". Janet Maslin from The New York Times praised Wesley Snipes for his "funny, knowing performance with a lot of physical verve". The film was a favorite of director Stanley Kubrick.

=== Year-end lists ===
The film is recognized by American Film Institute in these lists:

- 2008: AFI's 10 Top 10:
  - Nominated Sports Film

== In popular culture ==
The category "Foods that start with the letter 'Q'" was an actual category on an October 1997 episode of Jeopardy!

In 2009, Nike teamed up with the filmmakers of White Men Can't Jump to assemble the package of shoes inspired by the characters Billy Hoyle and Sidney Deane.

During the 2020 NBA All-Star Game, Pat Connaughton competed in the Slam Dunk Contest wearing a White Men Can't Jump shirt.

== Video game ==
A video game based on the film for the Atari Jaguar console was released in 1995. It received mixed reviews, with critics praising its multiplayer mode but singling out its graphics for criticism.

== Remake ==
A remake of the film was released in 2023, starring Sinqua Walls and rapper Jack Harlow in his acting debut. Its producers included NBA star Blake Griffin and NFL player Ryan Kalil. It got a mixed reception, with reviewers questioning why it needed to be made.

== See also ==
- List of basketball films
- Reggie Harding
