= The Mad Scientist (song) =

Single by Large Professor

from the album The LP
- B-side: "Spacey"
- Released: April 2, 1996
- Recorded: 1995
- Genre: Hip hop
- Length: 4:02
- Label: Geffen
- Songwriter: William Paul Mitchell
- Producer: Large Professor

Large Professor singles chronology
| "The Mad Scientist" (1996) | "I Juswannachill" (1996) |

"The Mad Scientist" is a song by American emcee Large Professor, released on April 2, 1996, as the first single from his debut album The LP; the album was shelved by Geffen Records before eventually being released in 2009. The song contains a sample of "Dune Part II: Sandworms" by David Matthews.

== Track listing ==
=== 12" single ===
A-side

1. "The Mad Scientist" (Street Version)
2. "The Mad Scientist" (Clean)
3. "The Mad Scientist" (Instrumental)

B-side

1. "Spacey" (Street Version)
2. "Spacey" (Clean)
3. "Listen (Blast Off)"

== Charts ==
| Chart (1996) | Peak position |
|---|---|
| US Hot Dance Music/Maxi-Singles Sales (Billboard) | 15 |
| US Hot R&B/Hip-Hop Songs (Billboard) | 96 |
| US Hot Rap Songs (Billboard) | 26 |
