= Jeru the Damaja =

American rapper from New York

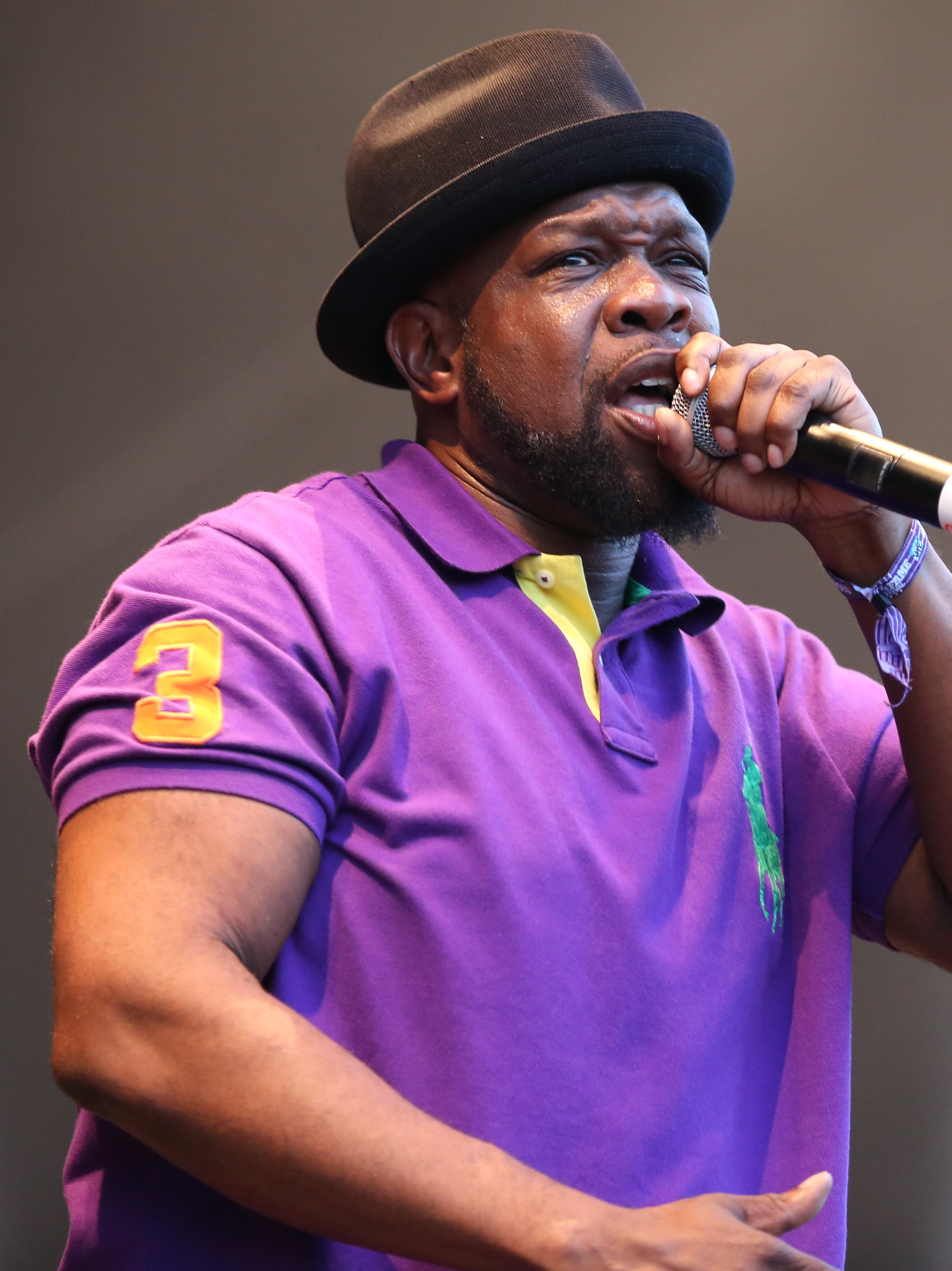
- Davis performing at the Out4Fame-Festival 2016 in Hünxe

Background information
- Also known as: D. Original; Dirty Rotten Scoundrel
- Born: February 14, 1971 (age 55); Brooklyn, New York City, U.S.
- Genres: East Coast hip hop; hardcore hip hop
- Occupations: Rapper; record producer
- Years active: 1992–present
- Labels: Payday; FFRR; PolyGram; Know Savage; Ashenafi
- Formerly of: Crooklyn Dodgers; Gang Starr Foundation

Kendrick Jeru Davis (born February 14, 1971), known as Jeru the Damaja (/'jeiru: ðə ˈdæmɪʤə/ JAY-roo thuh DAM-ih-juh), is an American rapper and record producer. He is known for his 1993 single "Come Clean" from his debut album, The Sun Rises in the East, ranked as one of the 100 greatest hip-hop albums of all time. He has worked extensively with Guru and DJ Premier of Gang Starr, whom he has known since he was in high school.

== Early life ==
Jeru the Damaja was born February 14, 1971, in Brooklyn, New York, and spent his early years in the borough's East New York neighborhood, where he began rhyming at block parties as a youth.

== Career ==
Davis first showcased his unique style to audiences on "I'm the Man", a track from Gang Starr's 1992 album Daily Operation and also "Speak ya Clout" from Hard to Earn. The following year he released his first single "Come Clean" which was produced by DJ Premier and became an underground hit.

Davis's first album, The Sun Rises in the East, was released in 1994 and produced entirely by DJ Premier. The album was well-received but was criticized by the Fugees for its lyrics, particularly for the song "Da Bichez". Fugees member Pras lightly mentioned Jeru on the track "Zealots", from the group's landmark 1996 album The Score, with the line "No matter who you damage, you're still a false prophet", referencing Jeru's single "You Can't Stop the Prophet". Jeru responded lightly in the intro of the track "Me or the Papes" and also on the track "Black Cowboys".

Davis followed up in 1996 with his second album, Wrath of the Math, again produced solely by DJ Premier. The album was also widely acclaimed, although not on the same level as his debut. As on his first album, Jeru was critical of commercial hip-hop artists and the record labels that produced them such as Death Row Records and Bad Boy Entertainment; the latter he criticized on the concept track "One Day". After the release of Math, Jeru reportedly had a falling-out with DJ Premier and Guru. Jeru, however, has dismissed this and claimed that they wanted to go in different directions. Nonetheless, in 2002 Jeru would make up with both Premier & Guru following the passing of shared friend Kenneth "HeadQCourterz" Walker.

Davis appeared semi-retired until 1999, when he released his third album, Heroz4Hire, released together with Mizmarvel, which was his first album under his then-newly created Know Savage Records. It featured the single "99.9%". His next album, Divine Design, released in 2003, was the first album under his new record label, Ashenafi Records. The album received little attention and mixed reviews. On April 2, 2007, during a La Coka Nostra concert at the Gramercy Theatre in New York, Jeru the Damaja came out for a surprise appearance to perform his song "D. Original". His album Still Rising was released on October 16, 2007.

In 2009, Jeru started to collaborate with drum and bass producers. In 2009, he is featured on Kabuki's track "Watch Your Step", produced by Mainframe and also on "Open Up Their Eyes" by Italian producer Fabio Musta. He also collaborated with Group Home in 2010 for a song, "Guru" dedicated to the late rapper Guru. The next year, Jeru announced that he would be releasing a new record with production by JuJu from the Beatnuts, Pete Rock, Large Professor and old collaborator DJ Premier, but the album was not released. The same year he featured in the song "Oddałbym" on the album Reedukacja of Polish hip-hop group Slums Attack (Peja, Dj Decks). Polish rap star OSTR also featured on it, and the album was a great success in Poland, selling out in the first couple of days. In 2012 Jeru featured in the song "The Mourning Son" on the album Remix with the Sun of French trip hop group Chinese Man.

In July 2013, Jeru promised to soon release a new EP with production from Large Professor, PF Cuttin, Junkyard Ju, and Sabor. On June 17, 2014, Jeru released an EP through Hedspinn Records entitled The Hammer for digital download.

In 2019, he reunited with Premier to feature on Gang Starr's “From a Distance” off their final album One Of The Best Yet.

He has a home in Berlin.

== Legacy ==
In 2013 The Sun Rises in the East was ranked as one of the 100 greatest hip-hop albums of all time by the editors of About.com, who called it "one of the quintessential '90s hip-hop albums."

In 2022, The Sun Rises in the East was named as one of the '200 Greatest Rap Albums Of All Time' by Rolling Stone magazine.

== Discography ==
Studio albums and EPs

- The Sun Rises in the East (1994)
- Wrath of the Math (1996)
- Heroz4Hire (1999)
- Divine Design (2003)
- Still Rising (2007)
- The Hammer (2014)
