= Akinyele (rapper) =

American rapper (born 1971)

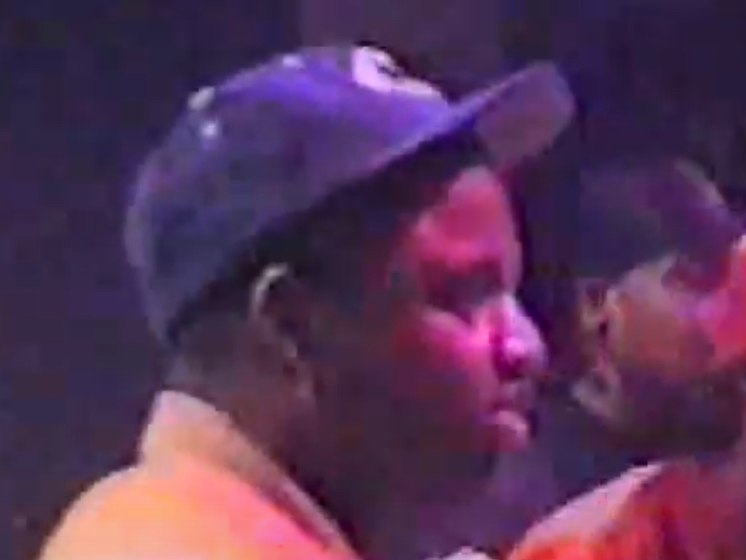
- Akinyele performing in 2001

Background information
- Born: Akinyele Adams; April 23, 1971 (age 55)
- Origin: Queens, New York City, U.S.
- Genres: Hip-hop; dirty rap
- Occupation: Rapper
- Years active: 1989–present
- Labels: Interscope; Atlantic; Stress; Zoo; Volcano; Jive; BMG; Koch
- Website: akinyele.com

Akinyele Adams (born April 23, 1971), better known by the mononym Akinyele, is an American rapper known for his sexually explicit lyrics, including his 1996 song "Put It in Your Mouth", and “Love Me For Free “ produced by platinum producer Frankie Cutlass He appeared on "Live at the Barbeque" off of Main Source's 1991 album Breaking Atoms. His first album, Vagina Diner, was released in 1993. In 2001, he released Anakonda.

In 2010, Akinyele retired from the rap circuit. In 2016, he opened V-Live, a Miami Beach club. It garnered controversy for its similarities to strip clubs, which are prohibited in Miami Beach, and for having overly loud music that disturbed local residents. Due to these and other issues, V-Live was forced to close down in 2019.

Akinyele is of Panamanian and Costa Rican descent.

== Discography ==
Studio albums

- Vagina Diner (1993)
- Aktapuss (1999)
- Anakonda (2001)

Compilation albums

- Live at the Barbecue: Unreleased Hits (2004)

EPs

- Put It in Your Mouth (1996)

Singles

- "Ak Ha Ha! Ak Hoo Hoo?" (1993)
- "The Bomb" (1993)
- "Love Me For Free?" (1996)
- "Put It in Your Mouth" (1996)
- "Take a Lick" (1999)
- "Do You Wanna?" (2001)
