= Human Nature (Madonna song) =

1995 single by Madonna

Single by Madonna

from the album Bedtime Stories
- B-side: "Sanctuary"
- Released: May 30, 1995
- Recorded: 1994
- Genre: R&B
- Length: 4:54
- Label: Maverick; Warner Bros.
- Songwriters: Madonna; Dave Hall; Shawn McKenzie; Kevin McKenzie; Michael Deering
- Producers: Madonna; Dave Hall

Madonna singles chronology
"Bedtime Story" (1995)	"Human Nature" (1995)	"You'll See" (1995)

Music video
- "Human Nature" on YouTube

"Human Nature" is a song by American singer Madonna included on her sixth studio album, Bedtime Stories (1994). It is an answer song to the backlash Madonna endured for the sexually explicit projects released in 1992, particularly her fifth studio album Erotica, and the coffee table book Sex. Written and produced by the singer and Dave Hall, "Human Nature" samples Main Source's 1994 track "What You Need", thus its writers Shawn McKenzie, Kevin McKenzie and Michael Deering are also credited.

In Australia, New Zealand and most European countries, the song was released as the album's fourth and final single on May 5, 1995; in the United States, a release was issued one month later, on June 6. An R&B song with hip-hop influences, "Human Nature" sees Madonna lashing out at her detractors, referring to her interest in "taboo" subjects as mere human nature. Upon release, it was well received by critics, who applauded its catchiness and unapologetic tone. In the United States, it surpassed her previous single "Bedtime Story" as Madonna's lowest-charting song, peaking at number 46 on the Billboard Hot 100; nonetheless, it reached the second position of the Dance Club Play chart. The single fared better in the United Kingdom, where it reached the top-ten.

Directed by Jean-Baptiste Mondino, the accompanying music video features the singer and a troupe of dancers in bondage-inspired gear, and was praised for its humorous tones. Madonna has performed "Human Nature" on five of her concert tours, the most recent being the Celebration Tour of 2023–2024. Influence of the song's unapologetic feminist theme and music video has been noted in the work of contemporary female artists.

== Background ==
In 1992, Madonna released her fifth studio album Erotica, the coffee table book Sex, and starred in the erotic thriller Body of Evidence. Due to their sexually explicit nature, all three projects were negatively received by critics and fans alike, who called Madonna a sexual renegade, felt she had "gone too far", and that her career was over. In March 1994, Madonna appeared on CBS's Late Show with David Letterman. The appearance was noted for an extremely controversial series of statements and antics by the singer, which included many expletives. In particular, she said the word fuck fourteen times throughout the interview. This made the episode the most censored in American network television talk-show history while at the same time garnering host David Letterman some of the highest ratings he ever received. According to Billboard's Joe Lynch, "for the first time in a decade of superstardom, people weren't shocked by her antics anymore — even worse, they often seemed exhausted by her".

Madonna came to the conclusion that she needed to "soften" her image in order to reconnect with her audience. The "first step to redeem herself" was the ballad "I'll Remember", recorded for the film With Honors (1994). The song reached the second position on the Billboard Hot 100, and received positive critical feedback. For her sixth studio album Bedtime Stories, Madonna decided to venture in the R&B and hip hop mania that was dominating the charts in the early-to-mid 1990s. The project saw Madonna working with high-profile producers such as Babyface, Dallas Austin, Dave Hall, and Nellee Hooper. The album was marketed as an apology; promotional spots aired on television proclaimed that it would be devoid of sexual references, with the singer adding that, "it's a whole new me! I'm going to be a good girl, I swear".

According to author J. Randy Taraborrelli, however, Madonna was still "seething" about the treatment she had received by the media. Alongside Hall, she wrote an answer song to the backlash she had endured the past two years for "daring to deal with subjects that are taboo". Titled "Human Nature", Madonna explained that song was about that "giving [my] back to the media. I'm not sorry". Nonetheless, she also added that it was about "closing the book on the last 2 years of [my] life".

== Recording and composition ==
"Human Nature"
30-second sample of "Human Nature". In it, Madonna asks "Did I say something wrong?/Oops, I didn't know I couldn't talk about sex", which nods to her previous album Erotica, and coffee table book Sex.

Bedtime Stories was recorded at nine different studios: Axis, The Hit Factory, and Soundworks Studios in New York City; Los Angeles' Chappel Studios; the DARP Studios and Tea Room in Atlanta; The Enterprise in Burbank; Hollywood's Music Grinder, and the Wild Bunch Studios in London. Personnel working on "Human Nature" included Frederick Jorio and P. Dennis Mitchell on mixing, while Joey Moskowitz was in charge of programming.

"Human Nature" is built off of a sample of Main Source's "What You Need" (1994), therefore, Shawn McKenzie, Kevin McKenzie and Michael Deering are listed as co-writers. It is an R&B song with hip-hop influences. According to the sheet music published by Alfred Publishing Inc., it is set in the time signature of common time, with a tempo of 88 beats per minute. It is composed in the key of C major, and follows a repetitive sequence of Fmaj_{7}–E_{7}–Am_{7}–Fmaj_{7}–E_{7}–Am_{7}. Madonna's vocals range from F_{3} to E_{7}. From The New York Times, Jon Pareles pointed out that "Human Nature" is the only song from Bedtime Stories that lacks its "melancholy nature", and does not employ a pentatonic melody. Deemed an "unintentional sequel" to "Express Yourself" (1989), its lyrics explicitly address the "media firestorm" Madonna faced with Erotica, Sex, and Body of Evidence. The singer herself described the song as her "definitive statement" in regards to the backlash she received for "having the nerve of talking about the things I did in the past few years".

The trip-hop-styled opening has heavy bass, drums looping, and Madonna repeatedly whispering the phrase "express yourself/don't repress yourself". In the first verse, she sings in a thin, nasal voice "dripping with sarcasm", the lines "You wouldn't let me say the words I longed to say/you didn't want to see life through my eyes/You tried to shove me back inside your narrow room/and silence me with bitterness and lies". At one point, she directly nods to Erotica and Sex by asking, "Did I say something wrong?/Oops, I didn't know I couldn't talk about sex". In the refrain, Madonna stands unapologetic, and brushes off the "prudes" who faulted her for fixating on sex, pointing out that being interested in said subject—considered "taboo"—is simply human nature; "And I'm not sorry/it's human nature/I'm not your bitch, don't hang your shit on me", she sings. She also asks "Would it sound better if I were a man?", implying that if she were, she would not have been as criticized. Also present throughout the song are the sounds of slamming doors.

== Release and remixes ==
In Australia, New Zealand, and most European countries, "Human Nature" was released as the fourth and final single from Bedtime Stories on May 5, 1995. In the United States, it was released one month later, on June 6. Nine official remixes were made available on August 1. Most of them were produced by American DJ Danny Tenaglia, who took the "face crackin' hip-hop jam" of the original and turned it into a "defiant house anthem", as noted by Billboard's Larry Flick.

The first mix, known as "Dance-Radio edit" was noted as being "more hip-hop than house" by Jose F. Promis from AllMusic. Promis described the radio edit, which omits the phrase "I'm not your bitch/don't hang your shit on me", as repetitive and lacking the "punch" of the original. The "I'm Not Your Bitch Mix" replaces the verses and chorus with whispered comments, such as "I have no regrets", "I'm not your bitch", "deal with it", and "I'm HIV negative", which are sampled over deep house grooves. The "Love Is the Nature Mix" has "swirling" instrumentation, turning the song into a "late-night, frenetic dance orgy". The promo-only "Human Club Mix" has "dark, underground savvy synth passages that best match the overall tone [of the original]". In 2001, the radio edit was included on Madonna's second compilation album, GHV2. The Howie Tee remix, was also featured on Madonna's companion extended play Bedtime Stories: The Untold Chapter.

== Critical reception ==
"After setting the tone with a whispered mantra of Express yourself/don't repress yourself, [...] [She] addresses her critics in no uncertain terms. [...] This is Madonna at her most unapologetically defiant, And it is a glorious thing to behold. It only got to No. 46 on Billboard's Hot 100, but 30 years later, it remains one of her most inspired moments as a musical provocateur".

— The Arizona Republic's Ed Masley commenting on "Human Nature" on the publication's list of Madonna's 35 best songs.

"Human Nature" received generally positive reviews upon release. From Billboard magazine, Larry Flick called it a "wickedly catchy jeep/pop jam in which La M unapologetically snaps at her more close-minded critics", and highlighted her "playfully snide and aggressive" vocals. Sal Cinquemani from Slant Magazine opined that, "whether licking her wounds over lovers or critics, Madonna has never sounded more emotionally vulnerable or more cerebrally plugged in than she does here". Similarly, author Mark Bego felt that on the song, "[Madonna] displays a fleeting touch of vulnerability". From The Baltimore Sun, J.D. Considine said that "Human Nature" and album track "Survival" were "the closest thing you'll find [in Bedtime Stories] to career commentary". On The Advocate's review, Peter Galvin deemed it a "delicious" song that "takes aim at who used her to live out their sexual fantasies and then condemned her for it". For Rolling Stone, Barbara O'Dair referred to "Human Nature" as an "infectiously funky [...] drive-by on her critics, complete with a keening synth line straight outta Dre". Lucy O'Brien, author of Madonna: Like an Icon, deemed "Human Nature" one of the "quirkiest" tracks on Bedtime Stories, "throbbing with a tightly restrained but devastating anger".

Chris Wade opined that the song "lifted the sadness" emanated from the first few tracks from the album: "[T]here's a great beat to this, a brilliant vocal where Madonna answers herself with whispers and an unforgettable chorus". While Melissa Ruggieri from USA Today compared it to the work of TLC, Pitchfork's Owen Pallett wrote that, "with its anti-slut-shaming slogan", "Human Nature" is one of Madonna's "most effective grooves" and one of her best songs. Mark Sutherland from NME declared it a "self-reverential 'steamy' Prince-esque romp". Barry Walters for the San Francisco Examiner, said that "Human Nature" has the catchiest chorus among all the other album tracks. Despite singling out its "clever" samples and interpolations, Quentin Harrison from website Albumism opined that the "petulant" "Human Nature" interrupts Bedtime Stories' "demure [and] introspective" tone, and "would have been better served up as a B-side". Writing for The Boston Globe, Steve Morse wasn't impressed with the track: "'Express yourself, don't repress yourself', she purrs in the whispery 'Human Nature', but that's hardly a new thought for [Madonna]. She seems lost at this point". Entertainment Weekly's Jim Farber felt Madonna came across as "petty [...] self-righteous and smug [in 'Human Nature']". Rikky Rooksby, author of The Complete Guide to the Music of Madonna, gave an unfavorable review: "Musically, ['Human Nature'] wears out its welcome [...] [It's] a very bitter, put-down song".

Matthew Jacobs from HuffPost placed the song at number 7 of his ranking of Madonna's singles, calling it an "R&B blitz that remains one of [her] most original songs". On Gay Star News' ranking, the single came in at number 15; Joe Morgan called it the "ultimate middle finger to her critics". Jude Rogers, from The Guardian also named it Madonna's 15th greatest, and her "best excursion into the sounds of hip-hop and R&B". Nayer Missim from PinkNews considered "Human Nature" Madonna's 26th greatest song, and Entertainment Weekly's Chuck Arnold her 24th; the former said that, "sounding like Britney before Britney, Madonna gives her critics a deserved thrashing", while the latter deeemed it a "defiant declaration". In Parade's ranking, where it came in at number 13, Samuel R. Murrian classiffied "Human Nature" as a "mesmerizing, funny and angry R&B earworm". Writing for The A.V. Club, Stephen Thomas Erlewine placed the track in the 36th position of the publication's ranking of Madonna's singles: "The opposite of an apology [...] Madonna rarely unleashed vitriol on record, which makes the nastiness of 'Human Nature' unusually thrilling". Joe Lynch saw the song as a precursor to Madonna's 2015 song "Unapologetic Bitch", and one that, "holds up as one of [her] finest '90s singles". For The Couch Sessions, "Human Nature" is a "dark, brooding masterpiece".

== Chart performance ==
In the United States, "Human Nature" debuted on the Billboard Hot 100 at number 57, in the issue dated June 24, 1995, with 7,400 units sold. Twenty one days later, it peaked at number 46, spending a total of 15 weeks on the chart overall. It became Madonna's second consecutive single to not reach the Hot 100's top 40 following "Bedtime Story". From Billboard, Fred Bronson attributed the song's weak performance to it not being "radio-friendly". Additionally, it reached the 57th position on the Hot R&B Singles chart. "Human Nature" found success on the Dance Club Play chart, where it reached the second spot. It came in at number 16 on the 1995 Dance year-end chart. In Canada, the single debuted in the 90th position of RPM's 100 Hit Tracks chart on the week of July 10, 1995; one month later, it reached its peak at number 64.

In the United Kingdom, "Human Nature" debuted and peaked at the 8th position of the UK Singles Chart on August 26, 1995; it spent 6 weeks on the chart overall. According to Music Week magazine, over 80,685 copies of the single have been sold in the United Kingdom as of 2008. The single spent three weeks at number 17 on Australia's ARIA Singles Chart. On the Irish Singles Chart, "Human Nature" peaked at number 21. It fared better in Switzerland, Italy and Finland, reaching numbers 17, 10 and 7, respectively. "Human Nature" performed poorly in Germany, where it reached number 50. It peaked at number 39 on the Eurochart Hot 100 In New Zealand, it reached the 37th spot of the chart, and remained there for one week.

== Music video ==
=== Background and description ===
Screenshot of the "Human Nature" music video, showing Madonna tied to a chair, flanked by two masked men. The bondage outfits are meant to represent "breaking out of the restraints", according to the singer herself.

Jean-Baptiste Mondino, who had previously collaborated with Madonna on the visuals for "Open Your Heart" (1986) and "Justify My Love" (1990), directed the "Human Nature" music video. Filming took place at the Raleigh Studios in Hollywood, California, from May 6-7, 1995. Palomar Productions' Anita Wetterstedt was in charge of production. After Mondino came across the work of artist Eric Stanton, who did S&M-inspired drawings, him and Madonna decided to have the video focus on the "fun" aspect of the erotic subject; "S&M is a game, you know? It's dark, it looks dark, but I think people have fun", recalled the director.

Jamie King was appointed choreographer, with Luca Tommassini serving as his assistant. King recalled that the singer "begged" him to dance on the visual. Madonna wanted it to be more "dance-oriented" than the previous Bedtime Stories videos, something Mondino disagreed with; he's not be fond of clips where "[there's] five different cameras shooting a performance [...] too much editing. I like the steadiness because then you can really enjoy the movement of the body". For this, he decided to put the singer and dancers in boxes, as there's not too much space to dance or move in, and he could create the desired graphic S&M imagery and choreography. According to editor Dustin Robertson, Mondino and Madonna both had opposite work ethics: While the former was "cool and laid-back", the latter was a "stickler for details".

In the video, Madonna dons a black latex catsuit, and bikini with stiletto boots. Her hair, which appears dark, was actually blonde at the time; she had leather strips painstakingly braided into her hair to blend with her dark roots. In some scenes, she is also shown wearing an afro hairpiece. The staff of Rolling Stone gave a description of the video: "Dressed in bondage gear, Madonna laughs, makes funny faces and disciplines her Chihuahua with a riding crop in a video that's kind of like 50 Shades of Busby Berkeley". It shows sequences of the singer chained to a chair by two masked men, making faces of "mock annoyance". In another scene, she uses a riding crop to whip, tickle, and laugh at a woman who's tied by her hands to a bar above her head, and at her ankles. The clip ends with the singer proclaiming the phrase "Absolutely no regrets".

=== Reception and analysis ===
The music video received positive reviews from critics. Author Matthew Rettenmund deemed it among Madonna's best, "equal parts funny and sexy", and the one that "sum[s] up [her] Madonna-ness". Louis Virtel from The Backlot placed it at number 22 of his ranking of the singer's videos; "it's rare that Madonna gets a chance to be both harsh and hilarious in a music video, and in this tongue-in-cheek, pleather-heavy vid [...] she's a vision of coolness and sexual superiority". While Matthew Jacobs called it "iconic in its own right", Sal Cinquemani considered it Madonna's ninth best, naming it "about as subtle as a slamming door", and adding that, "['Human Nature'] feels like a Party City send-up of her Sex persona, with costumes that are decidedly latex rather than cold leather". For Samuel R. Murrian, it is one of Madonna's "most memorable" videos, an opinion that was shared by Mike Nied from Idolator, who praised the choreography and named it Madonna's 15th best. Julien Sauvalle from Out magazine considered "Human Nature" to be one of Madonna's "most stylish" music videos. The latex look from the video was named one of the singer's most "unforgettable" by People magazine. A negative review came from The Advocate, where Jeremy Kinser deemed the video "silly" and chastised Madonna for "dressing up like a dominatrix again".

According to Mary Gabriel, in her book Madonna: A Rebel Life, the video shows the singer "at her most powerful. She has risen above sexuality. She now possesses and exhibits pure strength. It is the Madonna of Blond Ambition made razor-sharp by anger". Gabriel further compared the scenes in which the singer and dancers dance inside the boxes to comic strips; "just like 'Bedtime Story is a moving painting, ['Human Nature'] is a moving illustration", the author concluded. In Madonna's Drowned Worlds, Santiago Fouz-Hernández and Freya Jarman-Ivens highlighted the video's "cheeky sense of humor", and compared it to Madonna's 1990 single "Hanky Panky", as both are an attempt to introduce sadomasochism into the mainstream in a humorous "non-threatening" manner. They also pointed out that the singer's "disjointed and accelerated" dance moves on some parts, made the video resemble a silent film. "Human Nature" can be found on the video compilations The Video Collection 93:99 (1999) and Celebration: The Video Collection (2009).

== Live performances ==
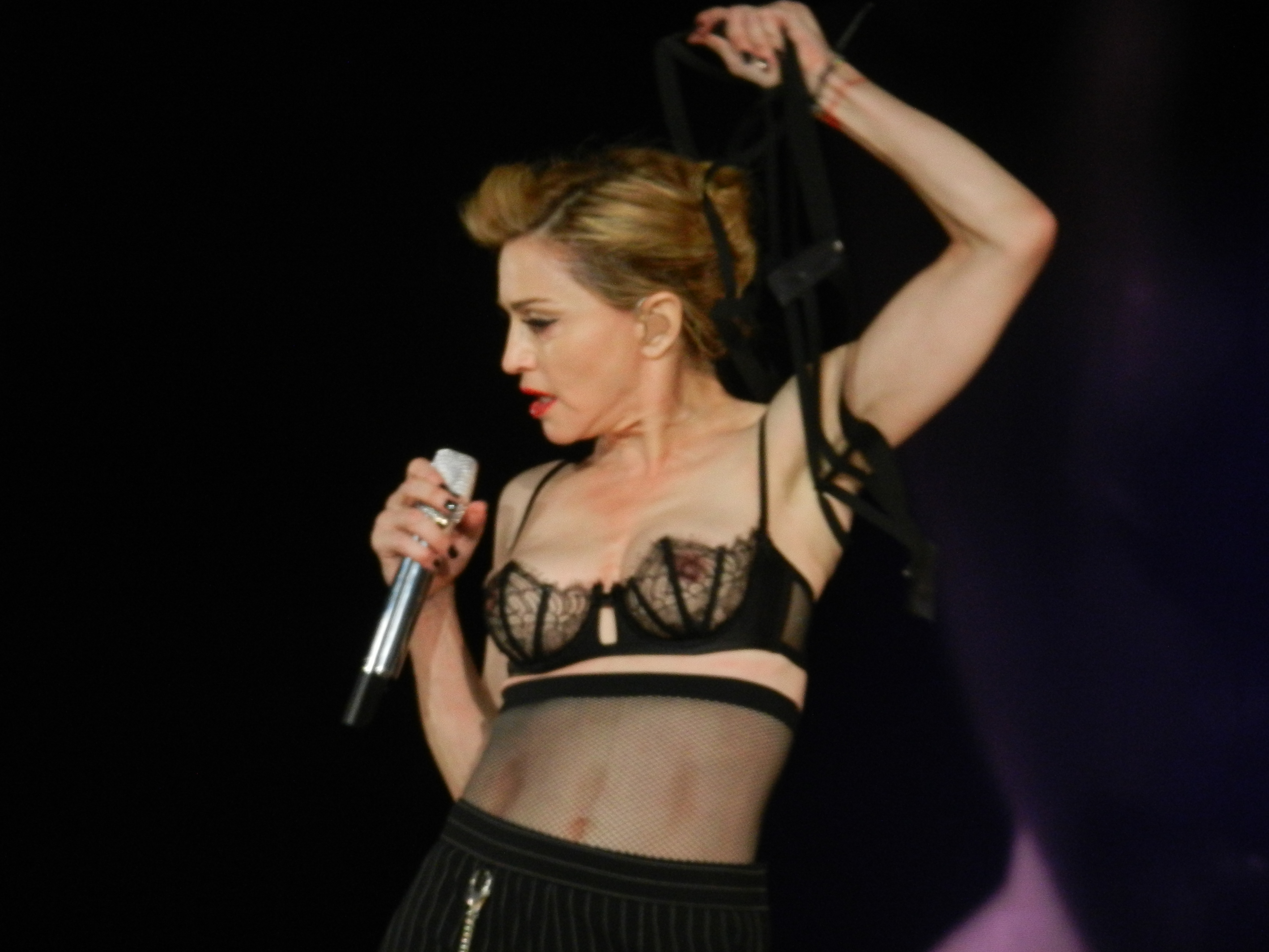
The song's performance on the MDNA Tour (2012) generated controversy, as it had Madonna doing a striptease.

Madonna has performed "Human Nature" on five of her concert tours: Drowned World (2001), Sticky & Sweet (2008―2009), MDNA (2012), Madame X (2019―2020), and Celebration (2023―2024). On the first one, it was given a cowgirl theme: The singer donned an American flag tank top, rhinestones, cowboy hat, and bell-bottom leather chaps. The number had a bondage-themed choreography with a lasso, and Madonna lap dancing a mechanical bull. The performance, deemed one of the night's "most startling sights" by The Guardian's Alexis Petridis, was included on the live video album Drowned World Tour 2001, shot at Detroit's Palace of Auburn Hills.

A remixed "Human Nature", with Madonna playing a Gibson Les Paul electric guitar and singing with vocoder effects, was included on the Sticky & Sweet Tour. She wore a white top hat and leather boots, while a video of Britney Spears trapped in an elevator played on the backdrops. According to Madonna, the video was an analogy to Spears' career; "Didn't [the video] explain what I thought? 'I'm not your bitch, don't hang your shit on me'. I just think people should mind their own business and let her grow up". On the tour's stop at Los Angeles' Dodger Stadium, on November 6, 2008, Spears herself joined Madonna for the performance. Reviewing the Vancouver show, The Province's Stuart Derdeyn panned Madonna's vocals during the "brutal" number. The performance was included on the Sticky & Sweet Tour live album release (2010), recorded during the four concerts in Buenos Aires, Argentina.

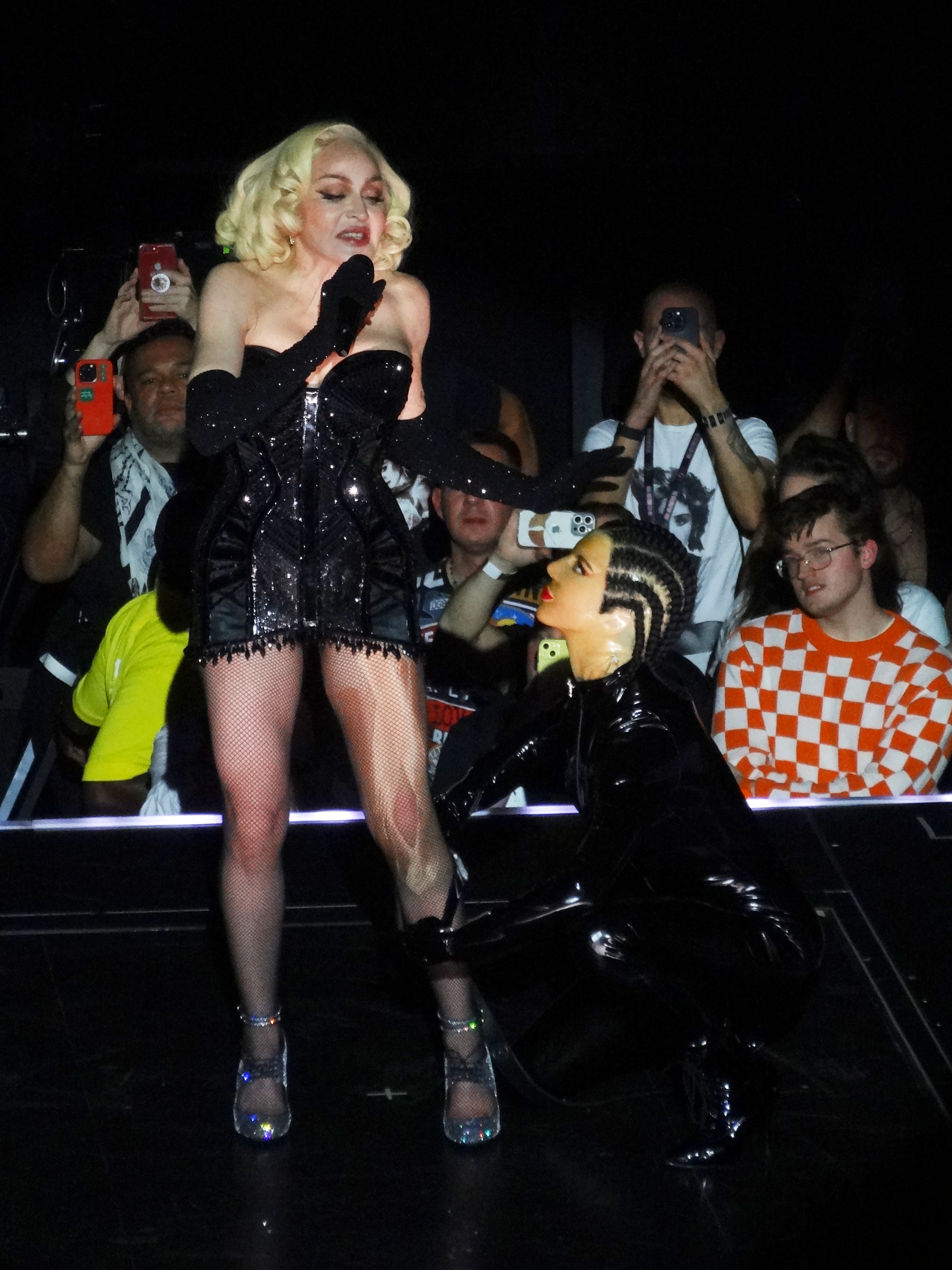
Madonna performing the mashup of "Human Nature" and "Crazy for You" during one of the concerts of the Celebration Tour (2023―2024)

For the song's performance on the MDNA Tour, the stage was set up as a hall of mirrors. Madonna sang as she stripped down to her lingerie. While performing the song in Turkey, she briefly pulled down her bra and briefly flashed her nipple; in Rome, she mooned the audience. Writing for India Today, Deepti Jakhar felt Madonna came across "a bit desperate to regain her controversial stage presence", and compared the antic to Janet Jackson's 2004 Super Bowl incident. By contrast, BuzzFeed's Amy Odell defended the singer; "apparently now when that inevitable thing called aging happens, [women] have to worry about covering up enough so that we don't look 'desperate' [...] Heavens! Women who are 53 still have breasts and... sex drives!", Odell wrote. The performances of the song at the November 19–20 shows in Miami were recorded and released in Madonna's fourth live album, MDNA World Tour (2013).

In April 2015, halfway through rapper Drake's set at the Coachella Festival, Madonna appeared onstage singing a medley of "Human Nature" and "Hung Up" (2005), wearing a t-shirt that read "BIG AS MADONNA". She then went on to "aggressively" kiss the rapper, whose shocked reaction became viral on the internet. Two years later, Madonna sang "Human Nature" at the Women's March on Washington, with added explicit lyrics aimed at Donald Trump. A jazz rendition was then done on the Madame X Tour. The performance saw the singer writhing "like a gymnastic clock inside a circular wall inset" surrounded by video imagery of pointing fingers, before doing a bongo solo. The number ended with Madonna surrounded by 11 black women —including her daughters, Stella, Estere and Mercy James— chanting, "I'm not your bitch!". From Las Vegas Weekly, Josh Bell considered "Human Nature" one of the songs that, "fit best with the [concert's] theme of defiance". The song was included on both the film that chronicled the tour and its accompanying live album.

"Human Nature" was mashed up with "Crazy for You" (1985) on the Celebration Tour. Madonna sings "Human Nature" after being arrested by dancers dressed as cops. She's then "rescued" by her "younger self" —a dancer in the latex catsuit and braids from the music video— and begins to sing "Crazy for You" as a "touching recognition of her bravery", as noted by PopMatters' Chris Rutherford. The number was criticized by Mikael Wood, writing for Los Angeles Times, who found it confusing.

== Impact ==
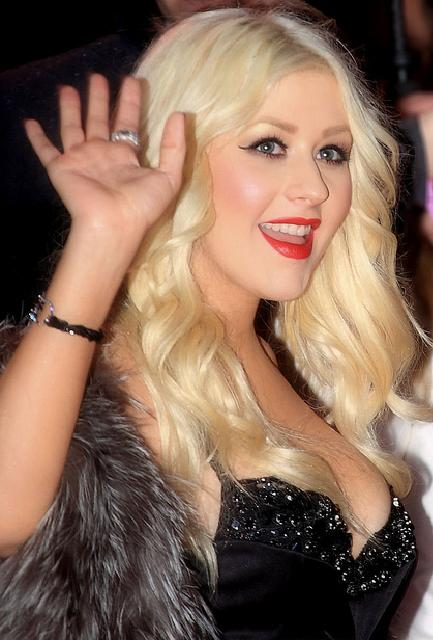
Influences of the music video for "Human Nature" can be found on the one for "Not Myself Tonight" (2010) by Christina Aguilera (picture).

The song's unapologetic feminist theme has influenced and can be seen in the work of contemporary artists, such as Christina Aguilera's "Can't Hold Us Down" (2003), Britney Spears' "Piece of Me" (2007), Beyoncé's "Flawless" (2013), and Demi Lovato's "Sorry Not Sorry" (2017). "Not My Responsibility", a track from Billie Eilish's second studio album Happier Than Ever (2021), was noted for recalling "Human Nature" "more than any other contemporary pop album" by The New York Times' Lindsay Zoladz. In 2023, Sam Smith included a cover of "Human Nature" on their Gloria Tour. The performance —praised by Madonna herself— sees Smith wearing glittering briefs, fishnets and nipple tassels.

According to the staff of Indian magazine Verve, the "Human Nature" video inspired the dance sequence of the song "Kambaqt Ishq", from the 2001 Bollywood film Pyaar Tune Kya Kiya. MTV's James Montgomery perceived influence on the video for Christina Aguilera's "Not Myself Tonight" (2010), most notably in Aguilera's "leather get-ups, her dominatrix attitude and the sultry chair-related activities she engages in throughout". Both Montgomery and Mike Wass felt that certain scenes of Rihanna's "S&M" (2011) recalled "Human Nature". Wass then concluded that, "['Human Nature'] boasts one of the most influential video clips of the '90s. [...] As usual, Madonna was a decade or two ahead of her time". "Human Nature" has been referred to as one of Madonna's songs that "should've been bigger", by both Wass and Lynch. Mary Von Aue deemed it the "definitive" song on Bedtime Stories, as it proved "[Madonna] owned her sexuality and would not be eclipsed by it". On this note, Lynch wrote:

Crafted as a challenge to those who thought she went too far by releasing an entire book devoted to erotic photos, and those are the people who don't want to discuss sexuality — they just want to chastise you for talking about it [...] ["Human Nature"] came at a time when the idea of an unapologetic woman was far too threatening for most — not just radio programmers and parents, but even many of her fans. To a Puritan, the only thing worse than a woman wearing a scarlet A is a woman proudly wearing a scarlet A.

== Track listings and formats ==
- UK cassette single
1. "Human Nature" (radio edit) – 4:09
2. "Human Nature" (Chorus Door Slam with Nine Sample) – 4:48
- UK and Germany CD maxi single
1. "Human Nature" (radio edit) – 4:09
2. "Human Nature" (Human club mix) – 9:05
3. "Human Nature" (The Runway club mix) – 8:19
4. "Human Nature" (Master With Nine Sample) – 4:48
5. "Human Nature" (I'm Not Your Bitch mix) – 8:11
- US, Canadian, and Australian CD maxi-single; digital single (2020)
1. "Human Nature" (radio edit) – 4:09
2. "Human Nature" (Runway club mix radio edit) – 3:58
3. "Human Nature" (Runway club mix) – 8:18
4. "Human Nature" (I'm Not Your Bitch mix) – 8:10
5. "Human Nature" (Howie Tee remix) – 4:47
6. "Human Nature" (Howie Tee clean remix) – 4:46
7. "Human Nature" (radio version) – 4:30
8. "Human Nature" (Bottom Heavy dub) – 8:08
9. "Human Nature" (Love Is the Nature mix) – 6:41
- US CD and 7-inch single
1. "Human Nature" (radio version) – 4:30
2. "Sanctuary" – 5:03
- Germany CD single
1. "Human Nature" – 4:54
2. "Bedtime Story" (Junior's Sound Factory mix) – 9:15
3. "Bedtime Story" (Orbital mix) – 7:41
- US 12-inch maxi single'
1. "Human Nature" (Runway club mix) – 8:18
2. "Human Nature" (I'm Not Your Bitch mix) – 8:10
3. "Human Nature" (Runway club mix radio edit) – 3:58
4. "Human Nature" (Bottom Heavy dub) – 8:08
5. "Human Nature" (Howie Tee remix) – 4:47
6. "Human Nature" (Howie Tee clean remix) – 4:46
7. "Human Nature" (radio edit) – 4:07
- German 12-inch single
1. "Human Nature" – 4:54
2. "Bedtime Story" (Junior's Sound Factory mix) – 9:15
3. "Bedtime Story" (Junior's Wet Dream mix) – 8:33
- Japanese mini CD
1. "Human Nature" (radio edit) – 4:09
2. "La Isla Bonita" – 4:02

== Credits and personnel ==
Credits and personnel are adapted from the Bedtime Stories album liner notes.

- Madonna – lead vocals, songwriter, producer
- Dave Hall – songwriter, producer
- Shawn McKenzie – songwriter
- Kevin McKenzie – songwriter
- Milo Deering – songwriter
- Frederick Jorio – mixing
- P. Dennis Mitchell – mixing
- Robert Kiss – assistant engineer
- Joey Moskowitz – programming
- Paolo Roversi – cover art, photographer, designer
- Michael Penn – designer

== Charts ==
=== Weekly charts ===
Weekly chart performance for "Human Nature"
Chart (1995)	Peak position
Australia (ARIA)	17
Canada Retail Singles (The Record)	9
Canada Top Singles (RPM)	64
Canada Contemporary Hit Radio (The Record)	33
Canada Dance/Urban (RPM)	11
Europe (Eurochart Hot 100)	39
Europe (European Dance Radio)	22
Europe (European Hit Radio)	35
Finland (Suomen virallinen lista)	7
Germany (GfK)	50
Iceland (Íslenski Listinn Topp 40)	28
Ireland (IRMA)	21
Israel (Israeli Singles Chart)	17
Italy (Musica e dischi)	10
Netherlands (Dutch Top 40 Tipparade)	19
Netherlands (Single Top 100 Tipparade)	8
New Zealand (Recorded Music NZ)	37
Scottish Singles Sales (Official Charts)	18
Switzerland (Schweizer Hitparade)	17
UK Singles (Official Charts)	8
UK Dance (Official Charts)	9
UK Hip Hop/R&B (Official Charts)	2
UK Pop Tip Club Chart (Music Week)	6
US Billboard Hot 100	46
US Dance Club Songs (Billboard)	2
US Dance Singles Sales (Billboard)	2
US Hot R&B/Hip-Hop Songs (Billboard)	57
US Pop Airplay (Billboard)	30
US Rhythmic Airplay (Billboard)	19
US Cash Box Top 100	28

=== Year-end charts ===
Year-end chart performance for "Human Nature"
Chart (1995)	Position
US Dance Club Play (Billboard)	16
US Maxi-Singles Sales (Billboard)	49

== Release history ==
Release dates and format(s) for "Human Nature"
Region	Date	Format(s)	Label(s)	Ref.
United States	May 30, 1995	Contemporary hit radio	Maverick; Warner Bros.	
Australia	June 26, 1995	CD; cassette	Maverick; Warner Bros.	
United Kingdom	August 14, 1995	12-inch vinyl; CD; cassette	Maverick; Sire; Warner Bros.	
Australia	September 4, 1995	Maxi-CD	Maverick; Warner Bros.	

== Bibliography ==
- Bego, Mark (2000). Madonna: Blonde Ambition. Cooper Square Press. ISBN 978-0-8154-1051-5.
- Feldman, Christopher (2000). Billboard book of number 2 singles. Watson-Guptill. ISBN 0-8230-7695-4.
- Fouz-Hernández, Santiago; Jarman-Ivens, Freeya (2004). Madonna's Drowned Worlds. Ashgate Publishing, Ltd. ISBN 0-7546-3372-1.
- Gabriel, Mary (2023). Madonna: A Rebel Life. Hachette UK. ISBN 978-0316456449.
- O'Brien, Lucy (2008). Madonna: Like an Icon. Bantam Press. ISBN 978-0-593-05547-2.
- Rettenmund, Matthew (1995). Encyclopedia Madonnica. St. Martin's Press. ISBN 0-312-11782-5.
- Rettenmund, Matthew (2016). Encyclopedia Madonnica 20. Boyculture Publications. ISBN 978-0-692-51557-0.
- Rooksby, Rikky (2004). The Complete Guide to the Music of Madonna. Omnibus Press. ISBN 0-7119-9883-3.
- Sullivan, Steve (2013). Encyclopedia of Great Popular Song Recordings, Volume 2. Scarecrow Press. ISBN 978-0-8108-8296-6.
- Taraborrelli, Randy J. (2002). Madonna: An Intimate Biography. Simon & Schuster. ISBN 9780330454469.
- Wade, Chris (2016). The Music of Madonna. Wisdom Twins Books. ISBN 978-1-326-53580-3.
