= K-Cut =

Canadian music producer and DJ

- Also known as: The Golden Boy
- Born: Kevin McKenzie; July 25, 1971 (age 55); Toronto, Ontario, Canada
- Genre: Hip hop
- Occupations: Record producer, disc jockey
- Years active: 1989–present
- Labels: Wild Pitch Records, EMI, Tumblin' Dice Productions

Kevin McKenzie (born July 25, 1971), professionally known as K-Cut, is a music producer and DJ, most notably as a member of East Coast hip hop group Main Source.

== Early life and family ==
Born in Toronto to a Jamaican father and an Afro-Guyanese mother, Sandra McKenzie, K-Cut's family moved to Queens, New York City, when he was a child. He and his brother Sir Scratch (Shawn McKenzie) were both DJs and attended John Bowne High School in Flushing, Queens, where K-Cut met future group member Large Professor. His mother was very supportive of her sons' aspiring hip hop careers, funding their studio time and becoming the manager of their group Main Source.

K-Cut is the cousin of fellow producer Rashad Smith, as well as musician Eddy Grant. His maternal grandfather was a Toronto-based soul/disco singer in the 1970s.

== Career ==
In 1989, Main Source released their first independent 12" single, "Think" b/w "Atom", under the mentorship of producer/engineer Paul C. On July 17, 1989, Paul C was murdered in his home; K-Cut later stated that Main Source "basically inherited Paul C's style" and strove to "carry the torch" of his sound going forward. During this period, K-Cut helped teach DJ Premier sampling techniques on the E-mu SP-1200. After self-releasing their second 12" single "Watch Roger Do His Thing" in 1990, the group signed to Wild Pitch Records.

In 1991, the group released their debut album, Breaking Atoms, which is regarded as one of the greatest hip hop albums of all time. Although Large Professor produced the majority of the album, K-Cut was praised for his "creative, energetic scratching", particularly on the track "Peace Is Not the Word to Play", which he produced. Also that year, K-Cut's production appeared on Queen Latifah's album Nature of a Sista', and he produced the bulk of The Black Tie Affair, an album by Toronto rapper Maestro Fresh Wes, which was certified gold in Canada.

The following year, K-Cut produced the Main Source single "Fakin' the Funk", which appeared on the White Men Can't Rap soundtrack and peaked at number one on the Billboard Hot Rap Singles chart. In 1993, he produced the Fu-Schnickens single "What's Up Doc? (Can We Rock)", featuring Shaquille O'Neal, which peaked at number 39 on the Billboard Hot 100 and was certified gold in the United States. That year, Large Professor left Main Source due to business differences, with K-Cut taking over as the main producer for their 1994 album Fuck What You Think. The album's single, "What You Need", was sampled for Madonna's 1995 worldwide hit "Human Nature", which credits K-Cut as a songwriter.

By the late 1990s, K-Cut moved back to Toronto, further contributing his production to the city's hip hop scene. In 1997, he produced the Infinite single "Gotta Get Mine" (featuring Divine Brown) and contributed to Citizen Kane's EP The Epic, both of which were nominated for a Juno Award for Best Rap Recording. He also produced two tracks for Choclair's 1999 debut Ice Cold, which won the aforementioned Juno Award.

In the early 2000s, K-Cut mentored a young Toronto producer named Watts.

As of 2016, he served as the touring DJ for Canadian singer Kiki Rowe.

== Musical style ==
K-Cut drew inspiration from the reggae music in his grandparents' record collection. When producing music, he visualizes an artist performing over the beat, before presenting the beat to said artist; one such instance was when he produced "How We Roll '98" for Big Pun.
