= Paul C =

Background information
- Born: Paul McKasty; September 20, 1964; New York City, U.S.
- Died: July 17, 1989 (aged 24) New York City, U.S.
- Genres: Hip hop, East Coast hip hop, Pop rock
- Occupation: Record producer
- Instruments: Keyboards, turntables, synthesizer, drum machine, bass guitar
- Years active: 1985–1989

Paul C. McKasty (September 20, 1964 – July 17, 1989), better known as Paul C, was an American East Coast hip hop pioneer, producer, engineer, and mixer in the 1980s. McKasty gained recognition for his work with notable artists such as Devo, Organized Konfusion, Kwamé, Queen Latifah, Biz Markie, Ultramagnetic MCs, Rahzel, and Eric B & Rakim. Complex called him "one of the most important figures in the development of sampling" and Questlove of the Roots called McKasty, "damn near the J Dilla of his day."

== Work ==
Paul gave himself the middle name "Charles" after Ray Charles, which he shortened to the initial "C". He developed an interest in music from his older brother Michael, who was a guitarist, and Tim, who worked as a recording engineer at 1212 Studio in Queens. According to Paul's middle school friend TeQnotic, he was an already gifted artist and bass guitar player in junior high. McKasty began his musical career as a bassist of the pop rock band The Mandolindley Road Show. Band founder and lead singer Lindley Farley said Paul was "a historian about pop music and soul music. And that's what informed everything he did." During the band's early years he studied his brother John's extensive record collection to learn about different genres.

One of the group's first shows was at the famed Max's Kansas City venue before it closed. Band member Lindley Farley credits Paul for being the group's best live performer during their early shows. The group later recorded a self-titled album at Hi-Five Studios in New York City, which they released in 1985 on Manna Records/Mando-Division Music. Paul co-wrote the song "I've Got A Hatchet" and his brother Tim played guitar on "First to Fight". Musician and producer Moogy Klingman, who was a founding member of Todd Rundgren’s Utopia, helped the group mix and master the album. Klingman acted as a mentor to McKasty and taught him a great deal about the post-production process.

After the group disbanded, Paul started making beats in a bedroom studio at his family's Rosedale, Queens house. During this time he did some mixing and mastering for the rap group the Clientele Brothers, which consisted of members Will Seville and Eddie O'Jay. Paul eventually moved his production setup out to his garage and was later introduced to rapper Michael Deering, aka Mikey D, by Eddie and Will. Not long after he joined Mikey D's group, Mikey D & the LA Posse. Mikey D described Paul as a musical prodigy and said, "He didn’t even really have to try that hard, it just came so naturally to him. Paul C. was a genius."

He also started working at 1212 Studio in Queens after dropping by the studio to purchase a keyboard voice synthesizer. During his visits he asked 1212 employee Mick Corey for a job. Corey described Paul as a somewhat inexperienced engineer who learned quickly. “Paul was green," he recalled. "I showed him a few things. He started doing sessions and generally took off from there.”

During his early days at 1212 Paul started sneaking Mikey D and DJ Johnny Quest in after hours to work on Mikey D & the LA Posse material. It was during these sessions that Paul produced singles like "My Telephone" b/w "Bust A Rhyme Mike" and "I Get Rough" b/w "Go For It". On "Bust A Rhyme Mike", Paul showed an advanced understanding of the E-mu SP-12 sampler, as he recorded Mikey D making three different percussion sounds with his mouth and wove them together into a beat.

He also impressed Mikey D with his ability to take vocal sounds from beatboxer Rahzel, change their pitch, then turn them into a fluid bassline on "I Get Rough". “Rahzel didn’t know that his voice was going to become a bassline,” Mikey said. “It’s not like Paul told Rahzel to play ‘Brick House’. He caught something from what Rahzel did earlier like a bass and then he played it himself. It’s like he programmed him into the keys to become a key on a piano.”

He also worked as a producer and engineer for numerous other hip-hop acts. Paul C's best-known work is on Ultramagnetic MC's 1988 classic debut album Critical Beatdown and the non-album singles the group released between 1988 and 1989. He has only one credit as a producer on Critical Beatdown, for the track "Give the Drummer Some", but according to group members Paul C was responsible for the overall sound of the album. DJ Moe Love said that Paul played a pivotal role in the song's creation, even coming up with the hook. Paul preferred to work without contracts, so he often did not receive credit for his production work.

Although his involvement with Kwamé is not as well known as some of his other collaborations, Paul engineered Kwamé's "The Rhythm" on Christmas Day of 1988. He also helped engineer additional songs for the Kwamé the Boy Genius: Featuring a New Beginning album, as Kwamé recorded six out of the eight songs from the album during the same session, which lasted from midnight until eight in the morning.

Paul also worked together with the Greek American psychedelic folk/worldbeat act Annabouboula, for which he did engineering and mixing in the late-1980s in the 1212 Studio, Queens, mixing and editing a variety of tracks that were released in Europe on Virgin and BMG and eventually in the U.S. on Shanachie. McKasty is credit with mixing its 1991 album Greek Fire, though it is unclear when he worked on this album with the group, as it was released after his death.

Paul C also worked for many other artists including Grandmaster Caz, Super Lover Cee and Casanova Rud, Stezo and Rahzel. Paul played an instrumental role in the making of Super Lover Cee and Casanova Rud's Girls I Got ’Em Locked album, which reached #77 on the Billboard charts and sold 425,000 copies worldwide. The single "Do The James" has been heralded by several producers for its mixing of multiple James Brown records. Cut Chemist referred to it as "the blend of the century."

He overheard a recording session of a new local group named Simply Too Positive and offered to produce its entire demo. Simply Too Positive eventually became Organized Konfusion and its demo created a major buzz around the group. The group recorded a demo with Paul that caught the attention of several people in the industry, including Mr. Walt of the Beatminerz. In a testament to Paul C's mentoring of the group and his assistance in launching their careers, Organized Konfusion member Pharoahe Monch would later say, "No Paul C, No Organized, No Organized, No Pharoahe."

In 1989, Paul did some engineering work on Queen Latifah's All Hail The Queen album, including recording the vocals for Mark The 45 King on "A King and Queen Creation". He also recorded extensively with the Boston rap group The Almighty RSO the week before his murder. According to group member Twice Thou, then known as E-Devious, the group recorded close to a full album's worth of material with Paul before his death.

Besides working with the cream of the crop in hip hop, Paul also did two remixes for the American rock group Devo with the songs "Disco Dancer" and "Baby Doll".

Paul C's status began to grow and he was hired to work for higher-profile artists. He produced the tracks "Run For Cover" and "Untouchables" on Eric B. & Rakim's Let the Rhythm Hit 'Em. He was planning on producing more songs for the group and also for Queen Latifah, Biz Markie, and Large Professor's group Main Source.

== Equipment ==
Paul was known for his innovative use of the E-mu SP-12 and E-mu SP-1200 samplers. The 1200 has a maximum sampling time of 10.07 seconds per beat, with producers often chopping the 10.07 second sample into smaller pieces to fit on each of the 1200's eight pads. Though many notable producers such as The Bomb Squad, Easy Mo Bee, Lord Finesse, Large Professor, Pete Rock and Ski used the sampler, Paul is credited as one of the early innovators of chopping with it. The Roots' drummer Questlove described Paul as "The engineer/producer/beatdigger who inspired your favorite producer's favorite producer. Like seriously--next to Marley Marl Paul was one of the first cats to... try ideas no one thought to ever do on such a limiting machine. Damn near the J Dilla of his day."

He also served as a mentor to Large Professor in the use of the SP-1200, lending Large Professor the machine for a two-week period. During that time Large Professor made 30 to 40 beats and learned how to use the machine on a more advanced level. Large Professor credited Paul C for helping him move from "pause-tape" production to making more elaborate compositions with the 1200, saying "He took me out of that tape deck era."

Large Professor described Paul as a wizard with the SP-1200 and recalled how he amazed people with his use of the machine. "To go in the studio, people would just go in with their jaws dropping, like 'Wow. This dude.' Because he was just so swift with it and knew what he wanted to do. And the beats would be so funky," he said.

The god emcee Rakim still keeps an SP-1200 sampler in his house in memory of Paul. In the Pritt Kalsi documentary Memories of Paul C McKasty he said, “You can go to my house right now and there’s an SP-1200 in there ’cause that’s what he taught me on. It’s like letting my man know I’m still focused.”

Engineer and producer Nick Hook obtained McKasty's SP-1200 from Merry Jane editor-in-chief and A&R/producer Noah Rubin. He uses the 1200 in some of his studio sessions with other artists and is currently experimenting with sampling from Spotify into the SP. Nick is currently using Paul's SP-1200 to archive old SP disks from The Bomb Squad and Public Enemy.

== Record collection ==
Paul was known for his large collection of hard-to-find records. He also had a reputation for taking meticulous care of his vinyl. Every record was placed in a plastic sleeve with a special paper and plastic inner sleeve to prevent dust buildup. According to Large Professor, Paul wore gloves while digging through records for samples, something he still does in his honor. “Paul took it to the next level. His records smelled good,” he said.

According to Large Professor, Paul preferred to sample original vinyl pressings and didn't like sampling reissues. He said, "He was big into originals, like, 'No, that’s a reprint man. You can’t...' It was almost like you couldn’t sample the reprint."

CJ Moore noted Paul's gift for sampling records that didn't contain obvious samples and his ability to understand how the music was played. "A lot of records we sampled aren’t jamming records," he said. "There were simple lines. But it was about how long you held the note, how you plucked it, how you approached it with velocity. Paul C understood how what we sampled was played."

== Drum programming, sampling, and sound design ==
Complex credited Paul C for introducing chopping and panning samples into hip hop music production. Chopping involves breaking samples into smaller pieces and re-arranging them. Panning involves orienting a sample in the stereo field, while hard panning is using only the left or right side of a stereo recording to isolate specific instruments in samples.

Several notable producers have also praised Paul C's advanced drum programming. Drummer, producer, and rapper J-Zone said “He was a damn genius. Him, Pete Rock, and Timberland all revolutionized drum programming.” Notable producer Pete Rock also praised his percussion work, calling his drums on Ultramagnetic MC's "Give The Drummer Some" “the illest drums I ever heard.” Rock was so impressed by Paul's work that he thought someone had given Paul the original recording of James Brown's "Give The Drummer Some" to use as a sample source.

Large Professor listed the sample on "Give The Drummer Some" as one of his favorites and had this to say about Paul's work on the song:

"This song is early sample innovation. Paul C was an extreme sound scientist, and this may be the most prime example of his futuristic approach. To take the James Brown “There Was a Time” off the Gettin’ Down To It album and pan (use only the left or right side of a stereo record) to get only the drums, was unheard of at that time. He not only heard that, but also heard the horn and guitar from the same record to create a real ill b-boy joint."

Collaborator and friend CJ Moore explained his unique drum manipulation techniques that he used to engineer Stezo's Crazy Noize album in an interview. “Paul wound up putting the record together and the approach that he had was a little eclectic. He started with the snare, then the hi-hats and then put the kick drum in. Then went around and got the hi-hats and re-sampled them and did all kinds of little things to it.” According to Large Professor, Paul would also double time certain elements of his beat to make sure they were "tighter than average."

In addition to chopping, drum programming, and panning, Paul is also noted for bringing a sophisticated level of musicality to his production. As a former bass player, he could play live basslines for his beats and he tuned his samples so that they were in the right key. On several occasions Paul made entire songs out of vocal samples, including several early records for Mikey D & The L.A. Posse. "He was one of the first to put together a song that was all vocals," Rahzel said while describing Paul's early work. "The only person who came close to what Paul was doing was Bobby McFerrin. And this is ‘85."

== Death ==
On Monday, July 17, 1989, Paul C was shot to death in Rosedale, Queens, at the age of 24. His murder was featured on America's Most Wanted, leading to the arrest of Derrick "Little Shine" Blair in Fayetteville, North Carolina. A witness who saw two men leave McKasty's house the night of the murder identified Blair in a lineup four months prior to his arrest on Tuesday, February 13, 1990. Blair was arrested along with his brother David Blair and David Currie of Fayetteville. The three men were arrested in the Sleepy Hollow mobile home park, located at 1100 Sleepy Hollow Dr, at 10:30 pm. The arrest took place after someone saw a re-enactment of McKasty's murder, which appeared on WNYW-TV's New York's Most Wanted and the Crime Stoppers television show in Fayetteville, and contacted authorities to tell them Blair's whereabouts. The three men were arrested in a coordinated effort between the Fayetteville police, the Cumberland County sheriff's department, and the New York Police Department. Blair tried to fight his extradition from North Carolina to New York at the time of his arrest.

Blair was also wanted on a Texas warrant for narcotics charges at the time of his arrest. According to Richard Piperno, a spokesman for the Queens District Attorney's office, a second suspect remained at large after authorities found Blair. The police were unable to determine a motive for McKasty's murder at the time of Blair's arrest and he faced a maximum jail sentence of 25 years to life. There is no public record of a second arrest ever happening and Blair was later released due to lack of evidence.

Several artists that Paul worked with, including Super Lover Cee and Casanova Rud, were questioned as suspects after Paul's murder. They were later cleared of any wrongdoing, but the implication that Super Lover Cee and Casanova Rud were involved with Paul's death was damaging to their career. "We were dropped from our label, our management gave up on us, people that were for us weren't anymore," Rud said. "To me, it felt like we were blacklisted."

Prince Po coincidentally stopped by Paul's house several hours after his murder. Despite no evidence linking him to the murder, he was taken to a police station and interrogated for six hours by police. He remembers the police being very aggressive, kicking his chair, and not letting him use the bathroom during questioning.

The Almighty RSO group gave Paul a ride home after their final session together the night of his murder. They were questioned the next day when they showed up to his house after he didn't come to his scheduled session. The police cleared them the same day after determining they had no involvement in his death.

Large Professor spoke about the difficult time after Paul's death where several collaborators and friends were suspects, saying "He got shot up and that’s all I knew. It was hard for me to understand. There were speculations about why he got shot. The people it might’ve been were actually sitting there at the funeral. It was confusing."

== Unreleased work ==
Several artists have alluded to having unreleased music produced by Paul C, though most of it remains unavailable. Despite never meeting Paul, veteran engineer Anton Pukshansky believes he has some of his work because of his close relationship with many people from Paul's inner circle. He said, "I probably still have a couple of SP-1200 discs with his name on it. I don’t even know if those discs work."

CJ Moore indicated that he has discs of Paul's work but it was too difficult at the time of his passing to release any of the material officially, saying "It was hard, I didn’t want to touch anything that he touched. I still have discs that he had involvement. He had 20 or 30 of my discs – I didn’t want ‘em back.".

Super Lover Cee and Casanova Rud, who were working on a sophomore album with Paul at the time of his murder, also recorded substantial material with him that was never released. Although there are disks of the records somewhere, they are not in the group's possession.

== Legacy ==
Despite his short career, Paul C left a lasting legacy on hip-hop music. Many people believe he would have had a legendary career in music. Large Professor said that Paul would "be right up there with Rick Rubin" if he were still alive today. Spin magazine wrote in 2009 that if Paul lived he would have achieved a level of success similar to DJ Premier.

His protégé Large Professor took over production duties on much of the music Paul C was working on before his death. He went on to become a well-known producer and emcee. Large Professor's publishing company is named Paul Sea Productions in honor of his late mentor. "Sea' was also a way to say that, through me, my namesake Paul would keep going," he said.

Other hip hop producers such as Cut Chemist, Domingo, Madlib, Pete Rock, and DJ Shadow cite Paul C as an influence. Kool Keith, Pharoahe Monch, and Rahzel credit Paul C with helping them to grow as artists. Kool Keith credits Paul's honest criticism of his raps for making him pay more attention to his delivery and pronunciation.

A picture of Paul C appears in the liner notes of Let the Rhythm Hit 'Em and the album is dedicated to his memory (although his name is not listed in the production credits).The liner notes of Main Source's debut album Breaking Atoms includes the inscription Paul C Lives. On Organized Konfusion's debut single "Fudge Pudge", the duo gives a shout-out that says, "Paul C to the organisms!"

Critical Beatdown was re-released in 2004 with the non-album singles that Paul produced as bonus tracks. In 2006, an unreleased album by Mikey D & the L.A. Posse was released under the title Better Late Than Never: In Memory Of Paul C. In February and April 2008, DJ Kid Grebo released a two-part Paul C mixtape hosted by Organized Konfusion member Prince Po.

In 2013, artist and record label owner Pritt Kalsi released the documentary film Memories of Paul C McKasty, a collection of interviews recorded between 2000 and April 2013. In a post describing the process of making the film, Kalsi stated "This is no way the definitive story or film. There is still a few key people missing. I hope that after watching this that they may want to contribute some footage that would make it the definitive film." Kalsi also states that there is videotape of Paul C making beats at his studio, but it is currently "amongst hundreds and hundreds of video tapes in a spot in NYC, to this day it’s not been found."

On July 17, 2016, DJ Toast of the Grown Man Rap Show released a two-part DJ set featuring Paul C's work to commemorate the 27th anniversary of his passing. Part One featured phone call interviews with Paul C collaborators Kev-E-Kev & AK-B as well as MC Outloud of Blahzay Blahzay. Part Two featured a phone call interview with Mikey D from Mikey D and the L.A. Posse.

A full-length feature film about his life and music is in the making.

== Tracks engineered, mixed and produced ==
=== Unknown date ===
Sport G & Mastermind - "Live" [Single] Mixed by Harvey L. Frierson Jr. and Paul C

=== 1985 ===
Double Delight & DJ Slice Nice - "Party Jump" / "Leave Me This Way" [Single] Engineered & mixed by Paul C

=== 1986 ===
Mikey D & The L.A. Posse - "I Get Rough" / "Go for It" [Single] Produced & mixed by Paul C

Disco Twins & Starchild - "Do That Right" / "There It Is!" [Single] Mixed by CJ Moore & Paul C

=== 1987 ===
The Ultimate Choice - "You Can't Front (We Will Rock You)" [Single] Engineered & mixed by Paul McKasty

Mikey D & The L.A. Posse - "My Telephone" [Single] Produced by Paul McKasty

Grandmaster Caz - "Casanova's Rap" [Single] Produced & mixed by Cedric Miller and Paul McKastee

The Heartbeat Brothers - "Can We Do This" / "Bring in the Bassline" [Single] Produced by Paul C and Lord Kool Gee

The Heartbeat Brothers - "Time to Get Paid" [Single] Produced & mixed by Greg Whitley & Paul C

Marauder & the Fury - "Get Loose Mother Goose" [Single] Produced by Paul C, mixed by Jazzy Jay / "Terminator" [Single] produced and mixed by Paul C

The Rangers - "I'm Hot" / "Jacks on Crack" [Single] "Jacks on Crack" Drums programming by Paul C

Super Lover Cee and Casanova Rud - "Do the James" [Single] Engineered and co-mixed by Paul C. McKasty

=== 1988 ===
Captain G. Whiz - "It's Hyped" / "All the Way Live" [Single] Engineered by Paul McKastee

Mikey D & The L.A. Posse - "Out of Control" / "Comin' in the House" [Single] Produced by Paul C

Super Lover Cee and Casanova Rud - "I Gotta Good Thing" (Remix) / "Gets No Deeper" (Remix) [Single] "I Gotta Good Thing" produced, programmed, arranged and mixed by Paul C. McKasty

Super Lover Cee and Casanova Rud - "Super - Casanova" [Single] Mixed and arranged by Paul C. McKasty

Super Lover Cee and Casanova Rud - "Girls I Got 'Em Locked" / "I Gotta Good Thing" Recorded and mixed by Paul C. McKasty for Paul C Productions

Ultramagnetic MCs - "Watch Me Now" / "Feelin' It" [Single] "Watch Me Now" Recorded & mixed by Paul C

Ultramagnetic MCs - Critical Beatdown [Album] Uncredited mixing and engineering by Paul C

Live N Effect Posse - I'm Getting Physical [EP] Arranged by Dr. Shock and Paul Cee

Kev-E-Kev & AK-B - "Listen to the Man" [Single] Engineered & co-mixed by Paul C. McKastey

Phase n' Rhythm - "Hyperactive" / "Brainfood" (1988) [Single] Produced by Paul C

Black by Demand - "Can’t Get Enough" / "All Rappers Give Up" (1988) [Single] "Can't Get Enough" mixed by Paul C

The Mic Profesah - "Bust the Format" / "Cry Freedom" [Single] Engineered by Paul McKasty

Spicey Ham - "Sex, Sex & More Sex" / "You Never Heard of Me & I Never Heard of You" [Single] Engineered & mixed by Paul C

M.C. Tatiana - "Mission to Rock" / "Back Up Jack" [Single] Engineered by Paul McKasty

360 Degrees - "Years to Build" / "Pelon" [Single] Recorded and mixed by Paul C.

CKO and Sta La Fro - "Sweat My Moves" / "Down on the Corner" [Single] DNA International Records / "Produced by Paul C"

=== 1989 ===
Too Poetic - "Poetical Terror" / "God Made Me Funky" [Single] Mixed by Paul C., Engineered by Paul C. and J. Tinsley

MC Outloud - "Clean and Sober" / "I'll Put a Hurten" [Single] Engineered by Paul C & CJ

Kev-E-Kev & AK-B - "Keep On Doin'" [Single] Co-produced, engineered & mixed by Paul C. McKasty

Freak L - "Line for Line" / "When the Pen Hits the Paper" (1989) [Single] Mixed by Vandy C. & Paul C.

Ultramagnetic MCs - "Give the Drummer Some" / "Moe Luv's Theme" [Single] Produced by Paul C

Ultramagnetic MCs - "Travelling at the Speed of Thought" / "A Chorus Line" [Single] Co-produced and engineered by Paul C

Main Source - "Think" / "Atom" [Single] Mixed/Engineered by Paul McKasty

Black Rock & Ron - True Feelings [Single] Hip Hop Mix by Paul C

Black Rock & Ron - Stop the World Engineered & mixed by Paul C, Jazzy Jay & DJ Doc

Stezo - Crazy Noise (1989) [Album] Mixed and engineered by Paul C

The Diabolical Biz Markie - The Biz Never Sleeps (1989) [Album] "Thing Named Kim" and "Just a Friend" co-mixed and engineered by Paul C (uncredited)

Queen Latifah - All Hail the Queen (1989) [Album] "Ladies First" and "A King and Queen Creation" engineered & mixed by Paul C.

=== 1990 ===
Eric B. & Rakim - Let the Rhythm Hit 'Em (1990) [Album] "The Ghetto" and "Let the Rhythm Hit 'Em" co-produced by Paul C (uncredited), Rakim and Large Professor, "Run for Cover" produced by Paul C

=== 1991 ===
Super Lover Cee and Casanova Rud - "Romeo" / "Giggolo" [Single] "Romeo" produced by Casanova Rud & Paul C, arranged by Paul C

== See also ==
- List of murdered hip hop musicians
- List of unsolved murders (1980–1999)
