= Looking at the Front Door =

Single by Main Source

from the album Breaking Atoms
- B-side: "Watch Roger Do His Thing"
- Released: October 25, 1990
- Recorded: 1990
- Genre: Hip hop
- Length: 4:10
- Label: Wild Pitch; EMI
- Songwriters: William Mitchell; Kevin McKenzie; Shawn McKenzie
- Producer: Main Source

Main Source singles chronology
"Think" (1989)	"Looking at the Front Door" (1990)	"Watch Roger Do His Thing" (1990)

"Looking at the Front Door" is a single by hip hop group Main Source, released on October 25, 1990, from their debut album Breaking Atoms. The song, which contains a sample of "Think Twice" by Donald Byrd, depicts disheartening romantic strife in its lyrics. It peaked at number one on Billboard's Hot Rap Songs chart for three consecutive weeks.

== Track listing ==
=== 12" single ===
A-side

1. "Looking at the Front Door" (Vocal)
2. "Looking at the Front Door" (Instrumental)

B-side

1. "Watch Roger Do His Thing" (Vocal)
2. "Watch Roger Do His Thing" (Instrumental)

== Charts ==
Chart (1990–91)	Peak position
US Hot Rap Songs (Billboard)	1
