= Main Source =

Canadian/American hip-hop group

- Main Source circa 1991. From left to right: Sir Scratch, Large Professor and K-Cut

Background information
- Origin: Queens, New York City, U.S. Toronto, Ontario, Canada
- Genre: East Coast hip-hop
- Years active: 1989–1994, 2002
- Labels: Wild Pitch; EMI
- Past members: Large Professor; K-Cut; Sir Scratch; Mikey D

Main Source is an American East Coast hip-hop group formed in Queens, New York, in 1989. The group was founded by DJs and producers K-Cut (Kevin McKenzie) and Sir Scratch (Shawn McKenzie), alongside rapper and producer Large Professor (William Paul Mitchell). Although K-Cut and Sir Scratch were born in Toronto, Canada, they were raised in Queens, New York, where the group originated.

Following Large Professor’s departure to pursue a solo career, fellow Queens rapper Mikey D (Michael Deering) joined Main Source as an additional member, contributing vocals to the group’s second studio album, Fuck What You Think (1994).

== History ==
Main Source was founded in 1989. The group released its debut album, Breaking Atoms, on July 23, 1991. The album is notable for featuring the first on-record appearance of Nas on the track "Live at the Barbeque," alongside Joe Fatal and Akinyele. Other tracks include "Looking at the Front Door", "Just a Friendly Game of Baseball", and "Watch Roger Do His Thing". Because of business differences, the group broke up before its second album, tentatively titled The Science could be released. However, Sir Scratch and K-Cut released a second album under the Main Source name titled Fuck What You Think, with new recruit Michael Deering aka Mikey D on vocals & featured another first on-record appearance for The Dog Pack which would later become the Yonkers rap group The LOX on "Set It Off"; however, the album was shelved due to inner conflicts between Wild Pitch Records and group management., The singer Madonna sampled the bassline from "What You Need" on Fuck What You Think in her song "Human Nature," which appeared on her 1994 album, Bedtime Stories.

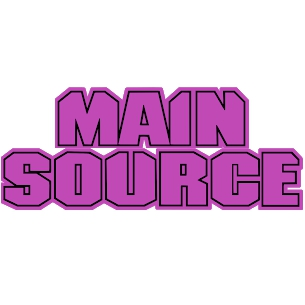
Main Source logo

Prior to Main Source, Mikey D was also one third of the Laurelton, Queens-based hip-hop group Mikey D & The L.A. Posse. The group also consisted of DJ Johnnie Quest and engineer/producer Paul C (who was also the mentor of Large Professor). In 1988, Mikey D was also the winner of the New Music Seminar battle for world supremacy.

Large Professor went on to be an instrumental producer for hip-hop stars such as Eric B. & Rakim, Pete Rock & CL Smooth, Nas, and Diamond D. He references his falling-out with Sir Scratch and K-Cut on A Tribe Called Quest's third album Midnight Marauders. On the track "Keep It Rollin'" he says, "I'm Uptown chillin', takin in this Grandmaster Vic blend/from the projects, the PJ's, fuck them two DJ's; Self mission."

K-Cut also produced for a wide range of hip-hop artists, including Big Pun, Maestro Fresh-Wes, Fu-Schnickens, Queen Latifah, and even NBA star Shaquille O'Neal. He also mentored another Toronto-based producer named Watts.

On December 22, 2002, at a concert in Toronto, the original members of Main Source performed together for the first time in nearly 10 years.

Breaking Atoms was named as one of two jury vote winners, alongside Buffy Sainte-Marie's It's My Way!, of the Polaris Heritage Prize at the 2020 Polaris Music Prize.

== Discography ==
=== Studio albums ===
- Breaking Atoms (1991)
- Fuck What You Think (1994)
- The Science (2023) (Album recorded between 1991 and 1994)

=== Singles ===
- "Think" (1989)
- "Looking at the Front Door" (1990)
- "Watch Roger Do His Thing" (1990)
- "Just Hangin' Out" (1991)
- "Peace Is Not the Word to Play" (1991)
- "Fakin' the Funk" (1992)
- "What You Need" (1993)

=== Guest appearances ===
- The Brand New Heavies - "Bonafide Funk" from Heavy Rhyme Experience, Vol. 1 (1992)

== Charts ==
Year	Song	US Rap	Album
1990	"Looking at the Front Door"	1	Breaking Atoms
1991	"Just Hangin' Out"	11	Breaking Atoms
1992	"Fakin' the Funk"	1	White Men Can't Rap
1994	"What You Need"	48	Fuck What You Think
