= Crazy Noise (Stezo album) =

Studio album by Stezo
- Released: 1989
- Recorded: 1988–1989
- Studio: 1212
- Genres: Hip hop, East Coast hip hop
- Length: 44:29
- Label: Sleeping Bag
- Producer: Stezo

Stezo chronology
Crazy Noise (1989)	Where's the Funk At (1997)

Crazy Noise is the 1989 debut album by New Haven, Connecticut, rapper and producer Stezo. After being a dancer for hip-hop group EPMD, Stezo signed a solo record deal with Sleeping Bag Records and recorded this debut album. It features two charting singles: "Freak the Funk" and "It's My Turn". "It's My Turn" was the first recorded sample of the drum break in the Skull Snaps song "It's a New Day". This break would become one of the most commonly sampled drum breaks for hip-hop music in the 1990s.

The album was mixed and engineered by Paul C.

== Track listing ==
1. "Bring the Horns" - 4:07
2. "Freak the Funk" - 3:27
3. "Talking Sense" - 3:20
4. "It's My Turn" - 3:43
5. "Getting Paid" - 3:50
6. "Girl Trouble" - 3:29
7. "To the Max" - 3:48
8. "Put Your Body into It" - 3:32
9. "Jimmy's Gettin' Funky" - 3:42
10. "Crazy Noise" - 4:05
11. "Gets into His Move" - 3:30
12. "Going for Mine" - 3:08

== Singles ==
Year	Title	Hot Rap Songs	Hot R&B/ Hip-Hop	Dance Club Songs
1989	"To the Max"	-	-	39
1989	"It's My Turn"	18	57	-
1989	"Freak the Funk"	-	85	-
