= Fuck What You Think =

Album by Main Source

Studio album by Main Source
- Released: March 22, 1994
- Recorded: 1993–1994
- Genre: East Coast hip hop
- Label: Wild Pitch; EMI E2-98469
- Producer: K-Cut (also exec.); L.T.; Sir Scratch

Main Source chronology
Breaking Atoms (1991)	Fuck What You Think (1994)

Professional ratings
Review scores
Source	Rating
AllMusic	2.5/5 stars
The Encyclopedia of Popular Music	4/5 stars
The Rolling Stone Album Guide	2.5/5 stars

Fuck What You Think is the second and final album by American/Canadian hip hop group Main Source. It was scheduled for release by Wild Pitch Records in 1994, although it is unclear whether the album actually made it to stores. However, the album was released, or re-released, in 1999. Large Professor, one of the group's founding members, left the group before the making of the album.

On this album, K-Cut and Sir Scratch combined their talents with Mikey D, an emcee previously signed to Sleeping Bag Records, who demonstrates a raw voice and delivery. The song "Set It Off" includes verses from Jadakiss and Sheek Louch of The Lox before they became successful a few years later. A female emcee named Shaqueen (Kool G Rap's former wife) contributes to "Set It Off" and "Fuck What You Think." Only one single was released from the album, "What You Need," in 1993.

Madonna sampled the bass line from "What You Need" in the song "Human Nature," which appeared on her 1994 album Bedtime Stories.

== Critical reception ==
The Encyclopedia of Popular Music wrote that the group's "fresh, jazzy platform was well served by the indignant, often complex lyrical matter they pursued." The Guardian called the album "only OK - but then, compared to [the] innovative debut, most records are."

== Track listing ==
All tracks produced by K-Cut, except track 2 produced by L.T., and tracks 4, 8, and 10 produced by Sir Scratch.

No.	Title	Length
1.	"Diary of a Hitman"	5:23
2.	"Only the Real Survive"	3:31
3.	"What You Need"	4:15
4.	"Merrick Boulevard"	3:27
5.	"Down Low"	3:36
6.	"Intermission"	1:56
7.	"Where We're Coming From"	3:22
8.	"Hellavision"	4:00
9.	"Fuck What You Think" (feat. Shaqueen)	4:37
10.	"Set It Off" (feat. Jadakiss, Sheek Louch, Lotto & Shaqueen)	4:41
11.	"Scratch and Kut"	2:06

== Singles ==
Single information
"What You Need"
- Released: 1993
- B-side: "Merrick Boulevard"

== Singles charts ==
Year	Song	Chart positions
Year	Song	Hot Rap Singles
1994	"What You Need"	48

== Personnel ==
- The Bomb Squad – Rap
- Terry Clarke – Design
- Amy Fine – Artwork
- Chris Gehringer – Mastering
- Paul Goodrich – Sequencing
- Daniel Hastings – Photography
- Richard Horniblow – Engineer
- K-Cut (Kevin McKenzie) – Scratching, Producer, Executive Producer, Mixing, Drums
- Gregg Mann – Mixing
- Bob Power – Bass, Mixing
- Sir Scratch (Shawn McKenzie) – Guitar
- Michael Warner – Keyboards
