= Annabouboula =

Greek-American musical act

Annabouboula is a Greek-American musical act based in New York City, featuring vocalist Anna Paidoussi and producers George Sempepos and Christopher Lawrence. Annabouboula first released records and performed in the 1980s and 1990s.

== Musical influences and style ==
According to its creator, producer Christopher Lawrence, Annabouboula originally was an experiment in applied cultural anthropology. Lawrence wanted to use contemporary New York musicians to record traditional Greek folk music and older Greek popular music as a way to encourage contemporary Greek rock musicians to create new hybrids rather than slavishly imitate non-Greek styles. In late 1985, he recruited Anna Paidoussi, an operatically trained Greek-American singer who was familiar with modern Greek music, to be the Anna for an act he dubbed Annabouboula, which is a Greek expression that means noisy confusion. With Anna's vocal abilities in mind, Lawrence and co-producer Sempepos selected existing songs and also composed new songs, which were derived from the repertoire of the indigenous Greek genres rembetiko, laika and dhimotika; the band would then set about re-arranging the songs to use contemporary sounds and rhythms associated with contemporary New York synthpop, experimental and post-new wave scenes. In the late 1980s, Annabouboula was one of the first American-based acts that could be categorized as world music or world beat, terms that were first gaining currency at that time. The liner notes of the Shanachie release of In the Baths of Constantinople say, "What [it] did was take a traditional belly dance and rembetiko music (smokey Greek blues) and electrify them, adding a funky rhythm and a wild psychedelic undertow to these dark and moody songs of passion and heartbreak." A review at Allmusic.com says, "[It] combines traditional Greek belly-dance music with elements of rock, hip-hop and dance music" and says of Anna Paidoussi that she may have been raised in the US, but that doesn't stop her from singing passionately in Greek on both originals and daring interpretations of classic Greek rembetiko and bouzouki songs.

== History ==
The group's initial recordings in New York City included contributions from musicians Bond Bergland, Hearn Gadbois and Chris Cunningham, who later formed their own group called The Saqqara Dogs. These early recordings, especially the track "Hamam", an original song based in part on the "Rembetiko" standard Μες Της Πόλις Το Χαμάμ (In The Baths Of Constantinople) re-mixed by New York-based Swiss producer Roli Mosimann, caught the attention of Greek radio deejay Giannis Petridis, who enabled its release as an extended-play maxi-single on the Virgin Greece record label in 1986. Chris Lawrence personally imported copies of the maxi-single and sent them around to radio and club deejays in the U.S. Subsequently, Sempepos, Lawrence and Paidoussi recorded more material working as a studio act with occasional guest collaborators, such as John Linnell of They Might Be Giants. In 1987 Virgin Records in the U.K. distributed a full-length vinyl LP called "Hamam" that included most of these early recordings; In 1990 this LP was licensed by Shanachie Records and released in the U.S. with the title In The Baths of Constantinople on CD and vinyl.

Meanwhile, a second LP was recorded by the trio and mixed by New York hip-hop producer Paul C (Paul C. McKasty). Most of this material was released in Greece on the BMG label as a vinyl L.P. with the title "Φοτιά /Burn Down The Coffee House" in 1989. In 1991, after extensive overdubbing and re-mixing, this material was released in the U.S. on CD only by Shanachie Records with the title Greek Fire.

In 1990, in anticipation of the American release of its two albums, Annabouboula created a live performing act that included Anna Paidoussi on vocals, George Sempepos on guitar, George Stathos on electric clarinet, and Peter Basil on percussion. This group's first appearance was on the U.S. television show Night Music With David Sanborn ( Sunday Night (American TV program) ). Soon afterwards the group started performing in the U.S. and Canada with additional members Wil Hinds on bass and Akis Perdikis on drums. Later members included Richard Bennett on keyboards and Oren Freed or Tom Schmidt on drums.

From 1991 to 1994, in addition to maintaining Annabouboula as a live act, Paidoussi, Sempepos, and Lawrence continued working as a studio trio to record new material; however after the group's last performances in 1993 Annabouboula effectively went into hibernation for 15 years, during which time only one song was released, for inclusion on the charity CD Balkans Without Borders (1999). In 2008 the group resumed working on the album it had started recording, overdubbing and adding new material. Most of the music accompanying Paidoussi's vocals was performed by Sempepos with contributions from members of The ByzanTones, a group he assembled to perform instrumental surf music with Greek and Middle Eastern influences. In 2010, this album was completed and released on Sempepos' own label, Byzan-Tone Records, with the title Immortal Water. The title song is an adaptation of an Asia Minor Greek folk song "Aidinikos Dance" as recorded in the 1920s by Greek-American singer Marika Papagika.

== Discography ==
- Hamam, 1986, [EP], Virgin/EMI
- In the Baths of Constantinople, 1990, Shanachie Records 64022
- Greek Fire, 1992, Shanachie 64027
- Immortal Water, 2010, Byzan-Tone

== See also ==
- Music of Greece
- Rebetiko
- World beat

== External references ==
- Official website
- Group description in answers.com
- Portrait on Balkans Without Border site
- Group details on Ectophiles Guide page
