= Sunday Night (American TV program) =

- Also known as: Michelob Presents Night Music
- Genre: Music
- Showrunner: John Head
- Presented by: David Sanborn; Jools Holland
- Country of origin: United States
- Original language: English
- No. of seasons: 2
- No. of episodes: 40 + 4 specials

Production
- Executive producer: Lorne Michaels
- Producers: John Head,
- Production locations: Chelsea Studios, New York, New York
- Camera setup: Videotape; Multi-camera
- Running time: 60 minutes
- Production companies: Broadway Video; PRA, Inc.

Original release
- Network: syndication
- Release: October 3, 1988 – March 1990

Related
- Saturday Night Live

Sunday Night, later named Michelob Presents Night Music, is a late-night television show which aired for two seasons between 1988 and 1990 as a showcase for jazz and eclectic musical artists. It was hosted by David Sanborn. Jools Holland served as Sanborn's co-host for the first season; Sanborn hosted solo for the second. The show also featured a house band of Omar Hakim (drums), Marcus Miller (bass), Philippe Saisse (keyboards), David Sanborn (saxophone), Hiram Bullock (guitar), and Jools Holland (piano). Hal Willner was the music coordinator.

== Production history ==
The show's host, David Sanborn, originally conceived of the initial concept for Sunday Night: to bring together an eclectic mix of musicians from different genres, have them perform deep cut songs individually instead of their hits, then have a group jam at the end where they perform in unexpected combinations. Having been a member of the band for Saturday Night Live, Sanborn pitched the show to the SNL producer Lorne Michaels, who approved and attached Michelob as a sponsor to bankroll the show. 12 episodes of the show were ordered from Michaels and his company Broadway Video, who pitched it as a musical counterpart to Saturday Night Live, The show was syndicated nationally, on 55 stations across the country (including NBC's New York affiliate WNBC 4) who mostly aired it at 12:30am on Sunday nights (technically Monday mornings). Michaels installed his longtime friend, British filmmaker and ex-SNL crew member John Head, as producer. At the time, Head told the press he expected the syndicator to order 25 more episodes if the ratings were good, but they only wound up ordering an additional 10 episodes and two specials. The show aired Sunday nights (technically Monday mornings) beginning October 3, 1988. The show was not considered a hit in the ratings, attracting 1.3 million viewers, but was critically acclaimed.

In 1989, the show was retitled Night Music (sometimes Michelob Presents Night Music) to allow syndicators to play it whenever they want. SNL music producer Hal Willner was brought in as the new music producer for the show. The show ended following its second season.

== Cast and crew ==
The Sunday Night Band Season 1: episodes 101–122
plays	1988 1st lineup	1989 2nd lineup	1989 3rd lineup	1989 4th lineup
keyboards	Philippe Saisse	Philippe Saisse	Philippe Saisse	Philippe Saisse
guitar	Hiram Bullock	Hiram Bullock	Hiram Bullock	Robben Ford
drums	Omar Hakim	Omar Hakim	J.T. Lewis	J.T. Lewis
bass	Marcus Miller	Tom Barney	Tom Barney	Marcus Miller
Music Associate (keyboards):			Brenda V. Browne	Brenda V. Browne

Night Music Band Season 2: episodes 201–218
plays	1989 5th lineup
keys	Philippe Saisse
guitar	Hiram Bullock
drums	Omar Hakim
bass	Tom Barney
hand drums, small percussion	Don Alias

Production credits
Title	Name
Sponsor	Michelob
Production companies	Broadway Video, Inc. PRA, Inc.
Videotaped at	Chelsea Television Studios, New York City
Director	Dave Wilson (1988–89) John Fortenberry (season 2: 1989–90)
Musical Directors	Marcus Miller (1988, 1989) George Duke (1989); Hiram Bullock (season 2: 1989–90); Philippe Saisse (season 2: 1989–90)
Producer	John Head
Co-Producer	Patrick Rains

== Series overview ==
Sunday Night seasons
Season	Episodes	Originally released	
Season	Episodes	First released	Last released
1	22 + 2 specials	October 3, 1988	March 30, 1989
2	18 + 2 specials	October 2, 1989	March 1990

=== Season 1 ===
No. overall	No. in season	Original release date	Guest(s)	Prod. code
1	1	October 3, 1988	Ruth Brown, Ivan Neville, George Duke	TBA
1	2	1988	James Taylor, Milton Nascimento, Nana Vasconcelos, Don Grolnick, Lani Groves, Dennis Collins, Ivan Neville, George Duke	TBA
1	3	1988	Eddie Palmieri, Nelson Gonzales, Phoebe Snow, Yomo Toro	TBA
1	4	1988	Dr. John, Mavis Staples, Jeff Healey	TBA
1	5	1988	Marianne Faithfull, Dizzy Gillespie, Dianne Reeves, David Peaston, Onaje Allan Gumbs	TBA
1	6	February 19, 1989	Slim Gaillard, Mark Knopfler, Randy Newman, Take 6	TBA
1	7	1988	Marianne Faithfull, John Zorn, Aaron Neville, Rob Wasserman, John Sebastian, NRBQ	TBA
1	8	1988	Jack Bruce, Joe Walsh, Al Green, Highway 101, Nat Hentoff	TBA
1	9	April 2, 1989	Boz Scaggs, Anson Funderburgh, Betty Wright, Trio Bulgarka, Dave Bargeron, Randy Brecker, Ronnie Cuber, Lou Marini	TBA
1	10	1988	Al Jarreau, Darlene Love, Bashiri Johnson, Johnny Clegg & Savuka, Lambert, Hendricks & Ross, Brenda White, Lani Groves, Dennis Collins (backing singers)	TBA
1	11	1988	Earl Klugh, Patti Austin, Joe Sample, Donald Fagen, Sister Carol, Kasey Cisyk, Lani Groves, Vaneese Thomas, Vivian Cherry, Bashiri Johnson	TBA
1	12	1988	Judy Mowatt, Joe Cocker, David "Fathead" Newman, Ladysmith Black Mambazo, Annicia Banks, Vaneese Thomas, Kasey Cisyk Lani Groves	TBA
1	13	January 15, 1989	Curtis Mayfield, Taylor Dayne, David Lindley, Jorge Calderon, Shinehead, George Duke	TBA
1	14	1989	Squeeze, Sam Moore, Stanley Turrentine, Ashford and Simpson, Joseph Joubert, Steve Thornton, George Duke	TBA
1	15	January 29, 1989	Youssou N'Dour, Theo Diarra, Mar Gueye, Habib Faye, Philip Bailey, Lani Groves, Marcus Roberts, Ambitious Lovers, George Duke	TBA
1	16	1989	Carlos Santana, Lyle Lovett, Chester Thompson, Armando Peraza, José "Chepito" Areas, Wayne Shorter, Fontella Bass, George Duke	TBA
1	17	March 12, 1989	Betty Carter, Branford Marsalis, Willie Dixon, Katie Webster, John Sebastian, George Duke	TBA
1	18	1989	Take 6, Rev. Claude Jeter, Rev. Shirley Caesar, Ann Caesar Price, Bernard Sterling, Michael Mathis, The Dixie Hummingbirds, George Duke	TBA
1	19	1989	Sonny Rollins, Leonard Cohen, Ken Nordine, Perla Batalla, Was (Not Was), Julie Christensen, George Duke	TBA
1	20	1989	Lou Reed, John Cale, Katie Webster, Harry Connick, Jr., Paul Shaffer (co-host)	TBA
1	21	March 26, 1989	Robert Cray, John Hiatt, Koko Taylor (failed to appear), Tracy Nelson (replacement), World Saxophone Quartet	TBA
1	22	March 30, 1989	John Lurie & The Lounge Lizards, The Roches, Little Milton Campbell, Marcus Miller	TBA
1	Compilation–1	1989	Yomo Toro (Show 103), Dizzy Gillespie (Show 105), Slim Gaillard (Show 106), Aaron Neville (Show 107), Al Green (Show 108), Boz Scaggs & Betty Wright (Show 109), Savuka (Show 110), Joe Cocker (Show 112), Louis Jordan (archive video)	TBA
1	Compilation–2	1989	David Lindley (Show 113), Squeeze (Show 114), Youssous N'Dour (Show 115), Ambitious Lovers (Show 115), Fontella Bass (Show 116), Betty Carter (Show 117), Branford Marsalis (Show 117), Rev. Claude Jeter (Show 118), Leonard Cohen (Show 119), Sonny Rollins (Show 119), Robert Cray & John Hiatt (Show 121)	TBA

=== Season 2 ===
No. overall	No. in season	Original release date	Guest(s)
2	1	October 2, 1989	Stevie Ray Vaughan, Pharoah Sanders, Van Dyke Parks, Maria McKee
2	2	1989	TBA
2	3	1989	Nona Hendryx, Pops Staples, Ivo Papasov and his Wedding Band, Adrian Belew, Elliott Sharp
2	4	October 21, 1989	Bootsy Collins, Loudon Wainwright III, Pretty Fat, Carla Bley, Steve Swallow, Allen Toussaint, Karen Mantler & Band
2	5	October 28, 1989	Todd Rundgren, Pat Metheny Group, Taj Mahal, Nanci Griffith, Christian Marclay
2	6	December 2, 1989	L.L. Cool J, Jean-Luc Ponty, Ray Manzarek, Elliott Sharp
2	7	1989	The Pixies, Sun Ra, Syd Straw, Arthur Baker, Al Green, Sister Carol
2	8	1989	Sting & Fareed Haque, Carla Thomas & Rufus Thomas, Bill Frisell & Band, Mary Margaret O'Hara
2	9	1989	Miles Davis, Hank Ballard & The Three Midnighters, Djavan, Marcus Miller, Zahar
2	10	1989	Sonic Youth, Indigo Girls, Daniel Lanois, Evan Lurie & His Tango Band, Diamanda Galás
2	11	1989	Eric Clapton, Robert Cray, Julee Cruise, Papa Wemba, Dan Hicks & The Acoustic Warriors
2	12	January 20, 1990	Conway Twitty, The Residents, Kronos Quartet, Aster Aweke
2	13	1990	Red Hot Chili Peppers, Toots Thielemans, Charlie Haden & his Liberation Orchestra, Nick Cave & Mick Harvey, Annabouboula, Sister Carol
2	14	February 3, 1990	Graham Parker, NRBQ, Abbey Lincoln, Phil Woods, Lakim Shabazz and D.J. C.E. Just, Steve Turre and His Sea Shells
2	15	1990	Bob Weir and Rob Wasserman, Screamin' Jay Hawkins, Modern Jazz Quartet, Warren Zevon, Artis the Spoonman, John Lurie and Nana Vasconcelos, Bongwater (with The Pussywillows)
2	16	1990	Richard Thompson & Jo-el Sonnier, Tim Berne, John Cale & B.J. Cole, Shawn Colvin, Howard Johnson, Sister Carol, Hank Crawford
2	17	February 24, 1990	Miles Davis, Red Hot Chili Peppers, Hank Crawford, Abbey Lincoln and Phil Woods, Kronos Quartet
2	18	1990	Eric Clapton and Robert Cray, Warren Zevon, NRBQ, Modern Jazz Quartet, Charlie Haden & his Liberation Orchestra, Dan Hicks & The Acoustic Warriors, Sister Carol, Steve Turre and his Sea Shells
2	Compilation–3	1990	Stevie Ray Vaughan (Show 201), Debbie Harry (Show 202), Al Green (Show 207), The Pixies (Show 207), Miles Davis (Show 209), Eric Clapton and Robert Cray (Show 211)
2	Compilation–4	1990	Pharoah Sanders (Show 201), Ivo Papasov and his Wedding Band (Show 203), Mary Margaret O'Hara (Show 208), Zahar (Show 209), Abbey Lincoln (Show 214), NRBQ (Show 214), Red Hot Chili Peppers (Show 217)
