= Mikey D =

American rapper

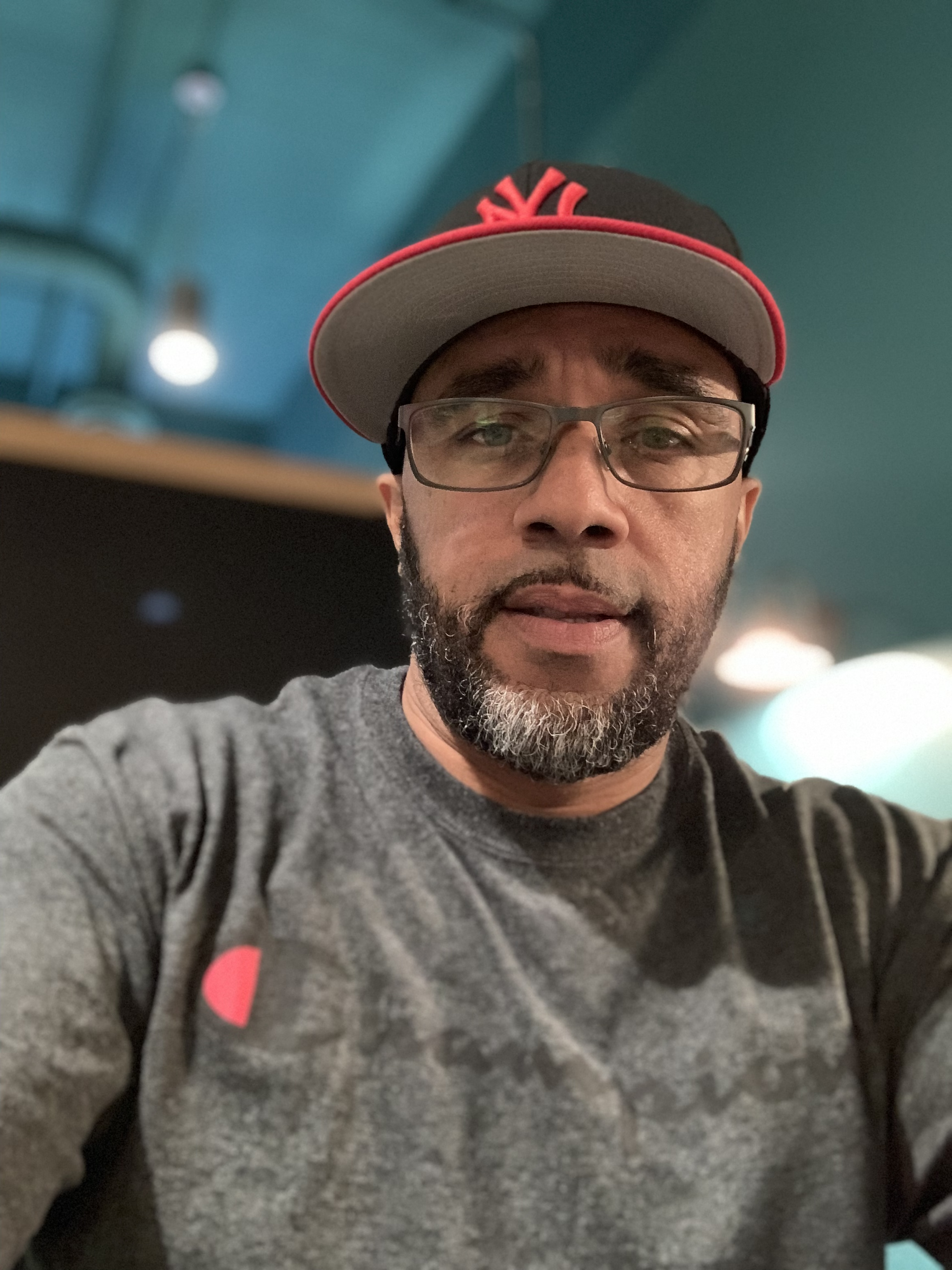
- Mikey D in 2019

Background information
- Also known as: Mikey D'struction; The Real Mikey D; Playboy Mikey D
- Born: Michael Anthony Deering; November 25, 1967 (age 58); New York City, U.S.
- Genre: Hip-hop
- Occupation: Rapper
- Years active: 1981–present
- Labels: Elements of Hip Hop; Wild Pitch; EMI; 16F; MicSic; Kool Kat
- Member of: Main Source
- Website: newstalgicmusic.com

Michael Anthony Deering (born November 25, 1967), known by his stage name Mikey D, is an American rapper. He leads the group Mikey D & the L.A. Posse, and he joined Main Source after Large Professor left to pursue a solo career. In 1994, he appeared on Main Source's second album, Fuck What You Think, as the lead MC.

== Early life and education ==
Mikey D was born on November 25, 1967, in Laurelton, Queens, New York City, to Linda Deering and Victor Fisher. His parents separated when he was young and he was raised by his grandparents, Jerome and Betty Deering in Laurelton Queens, New York. He attended PS 37 in Queens, followed by JHS 231, also in Queens. He attended Springfield Gardens High School.

Mikey started rapping during junior high school, after hearing music by the Cold Crush Brothers and Clientele Brothers, which inspired him to become an MC. He was the youngest member to join the Clientele Brothers, a group of emcees consisting of Eddie O'Jay and Will Seville. He would write rhymes and freestyle in parks and areas around his neighborhood, getting trained by O'Jay and Seville, working to develop his skills and rhyme flows.

While in high school, he met future emcee/actor LL Cool J (James Todd Smith), although he and Mikey did not go to the same school. James went to Andrew Jackson High School. They would come to each other's schools and freestyle rhymes together. At the time, LL was known as J-Ski, but Mikey suggested a new moniker for him. He gave him the stage name "Ladies Love", but James shortened it to just "LL." James added the word "Cool" and the initial "J", for his first name.

== Career ==
In 1985, Mikey and his group the Symbolic Three signed to Reality Records. Around that year, he and his friend Johnnie Quest met inspiring upcoming producer named Paul "Paul C" McKasty, through Cliente Brothers members Eddie O'Jay and Will Seville.

He formed a group with the late Paul C and childhood friend DJ Johnnie Quest. According to Deering, he stated that his group originally wanted to be called "Boom Bash", but one of his managers didn't think it was a good idea. The group was called Mikey D & the L.A. Posse. They were signed to Public Records. They had a single which was released in 1987, song called "My Telephone", along with tracks like "Dawn" and "Bust a Rhyme". He followed up with two other singles "I Get Rough" & "Go For It" in the same year.

In 1988, Mikey D was the winner of the New Music Seminar Battle for World Supremacy where he battled Melle Mel.

While recording an album with his group, he learned that Paul C had been murdered in his sleep at his home. There were disputes with another group who were also named the L.A. Posse, a group from Los Angeles and Sleeping Bag Records, a label that Mikey was signed to. Sleeping Bag Records was forced to drop the group's name after being sued for name duplication and Mikey took a three-year break from the music business after the death of producer Paul "Paul C" McKasty. While spending time in Miami, Florida, his manager was Mike Beasley. He had a cousin who owned a studio in Manhattan, New York City, New York. This cousin looked for a label to give Mikey D a record deal but instead, Mikey D caught the attention of R&B singer Jeff Redd when he heard Mikey's freestyling raps. Redd told him of a group called Main Source that needed a lead rapper. Mikey D contacted and freestyled raps to the group and they liked what they heard.

In 1993, he became an official member of the Toronto/Queens-based hip hop group Main Source after Large Professor left to pursue a solo career. He appeared on Fuck What You Think on Wild Pitch Records in 1994. They released a single called "What You Need", which did well in Billboard's Hot Rap Singles, only peaking at No. 48.

He is featured on a song called "Pump Ya Fist Like This" on Large Professor's 2008's third album, Main Source.

In 2015, Mikey released his first solo album, Day of D'Struction, on Elements of Hip Hop

Mikey's second album, Pop-N-Kim: Legends Don't Die was released on January 9, 2026, on Kool Kat Records.

== Discography ==
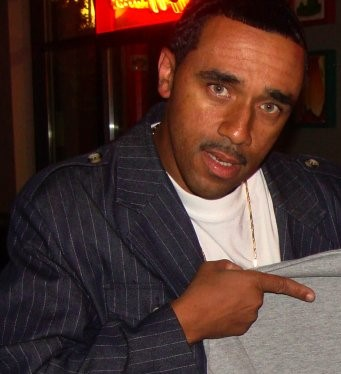
Mikey D in 2010.

=== Albums ===
with Main Source

- Fuck What You Think (1994, Wild Pitch Records)

as Mikey D and the LA Posse

- Better Late Than Never: In Memory of Paul C (2006, MicSic)
- Paul C Sessions (2026, King of the Beats)

Solo albums

- Day of D'Struction (2016, Elements of Hip-Hop)
- Pop-N-Kim: Legends Don't Die (2026, Kool Kat)

Collaboration albums

- Dramacide (with DJ Trouble Lee) (2019, 16F)

Extended plays

- Calm Before the Storm (with Elements of Hip-Hop) (2013)
- From the Heart (with J-Soul) (2014)

=== Guest appearances ===
- 2005: "The Perfect Storm" (Cee-Rock "The Fury" album Bringin' Da' Yowzah!!!) SB 1
- 2008: "Pump Ya Fist Like This" (Large Professor album Main Source)
- 2013: "Sweet 16s" (Neek the Exotic album Hustle Don't Stop)
- 2013: "The Amazing" (Red Venom album Red House)
- 2013: "The Operation" (DJ Shark album Oxidized Silver)
- 2015: "Mikey Destruction, Devastating Tito & DJ Slice" (Canibus & Bronze Nazareth album Time Flys, Life Dies...Phoenix Rise)
- 2019: "The Spark" (Taiyamo Denku album The Book of Cyphaden - Chapter One)
- 2021: "Nyghtlife" (The Good People album The Greater Good)
