= Breaking Atoms =

Studio album by Main Source
- Released: July 23, 1991
- Recorded: 1990–1991
- Studios: Homeboy, Power Play, Libra Digital (New York, New York)
- Genre: Hip-hop
- Length: 46:14
- Labels: Wild Pitch; EMI
- Producers: Main Source; Pete Rock

Main Source chronology
Breaking Atoms (1991)	Fuck What You Think (1994)

Singles from Breaking Atoms
- 1. "Watch Roger Do His Thing" Released: 1990; 2. "Looking at the Front Door" Released: October 25, 1990; 3. "Just Hangin' Out" Released: May 14, 1991; 4. "Peace Is Not the Word to Play" Released: October 22, 1991

Breaking Atoms is the first album by American/Canadian hip-hop group Main Source, released on July 23, 1991, through Wild Pitch Records. It was produced by the group, primarily by member Large Professor, with recording sessions taking place during 1990–1991 at Homeboy Studio, Power Play Studios, and Libra Digital in New York City. Breaking Atoms is distinguished stylistically by its incorporation of jazz and soul music samples. The album has been highly regarded by music writers due mostly to its production, whose heavy and original use of sampling influenced hip-hop producers for a considerable portion of the 1990s.

The album has been widely regarded by writers and music critics as a significantly influential album and has been noted for debuting rapper Nasty Nas, who appears on the track "Live at the Barbeque". His contribution to the song was sampled on "The Genesis", the intro track to his debut album Illmatic (1994). Breaking Atoms has been recognized as one of the most important records in hip-hop history, and was out of print in the United States after the demise of Wild Pitch Records in 1997. It was reissued on April 22, 2008, through Fontana Distribution.

== Music ==
Breaking Atoms was produced using the E-mu SP-1200. AllMusic's Steve Huey writes that the album's acclaim lies mostly in its production, which popularized a number of now widely imitated techniques. Huey describes that the "intricately constructed tracks are filled with jazz and soul samples, layered percussion, off-kilter sampling effects, and an overall sonic richness." RapReviews also notes that the beats are the cornerstone of the record. Dan Nishimoto of PopMatters considers the album's sampling to be "neatly layered, its subject matter is modest, and its overall tone is simply well executed fun." In his book Classic Material: The Hip-Hop Album Guide, Oliver Wang writes that Large Professor as a producer "thinks in complete song structure, never focusing on one single element—a loop, a break—but always juggling them in unison."

== Reception ==
Professional ratings
Review scores
Source	Rating
AllMusic	5/5 stars
Entertainment Weekly	B+
RapReviews	10/10
The Rolling Stone Album Guide	4/5 stars
The Source	4.5/5 stars

Upon its release, Breaking Atoms received critical acclaim. J the Sultan of The Source hailed it as "New York hip-hop at its best", praising its "slamming beats and smooth, nod-your-head-to-this grooves thick with jazz-infused samples", as well as the "clever rhymes that you want to follow word-for-word." Entertainment Weekly's James Bernard wrote that "Main Source may not break much new ground, but [it] offer[s] a clever, quietly seductive collection in which the bass and drum tracks casually strut instead of stomp, and the sparse samples of guitar and horns allow the Large Professor's voice to take center stage." The Baltimore Sun said that "Main Source understands how to compliment the depth of its rhymes by stressing the complexity of its music".

Since its initial reception, the album has received retrospective acclaim from writers and music critics. AllMusic writer Steve Huey declared it "one of the quintessential cult classics in hip-hop history". In 2004's The New Rolling Stone Album Guide, Peter Relic wrote that "From the candy-colored cover depicting the three members crowded around a fantasy science project to the uptempo beats and matching fast raps, it's a period piece whose meticulous presentation... make it an enduring pleasure from a bygone era." PopMatters' Dan Nishimoto called it "deliberately smart and rough" and praised the varied scope of its production and sampling. RapReviews notes that many acknowledge Breaking Atoms to be on a similar level to Nas' Illmatic (1994) and A Tribe Called Quest's first three albums, while Tom Ewing of Freaky Trigger wrote that the album's "legend" grew exponentially during the period when it was out of print. Ewing deemed the album "as instantly enjoyable as I hoped it would be – chunky samples, large beats, twisty rhymes about interesting things (police-violence as sport metaphor 'Just a Friendly Game of Baseball' for instance)."

=== Accolades ===
SoundProof magazine lists the album at number sixteen in "The Top 20 Toronto Albums Ever" and About.com's Henry Adaso lists it at number twenty in the "100 Greatest Hip-Hop Albums". In 1998, The Source selected the album as one of its 100 Best Rap Albums. Initially giving a four-and-a-half out of five "mic" rating, The Source gave the album a five "mic" rating in a retrospective list of "5 Mic Hip-Hop Classics" in its 150th issue.

The album was named as one of two jury vote winners, alongside Buffy Sainte-Marie's It's My Way!, of the Polaris Heritage Prize at the 2020 Polaris Music Prize.

== Track listing ==
- All tracks produced by Main Source, except #8 co-produced by Pete Rock.

No.	Title	Length
1.	"Snake Eyes"	3:30
2.	"Just Hangin' Out"	4:10
3.	"Looking at the Front Door"	4:10
4.	"Large Professor"	3:08
5.	"Just a Friendly Game of Baseball"	3:22
6.	"Scratch & Kut"	2:57
7.	"Peace Is Not the Word to Play"	3:07
8.	"Vamos a Rapiar" (featuring Joe Fatal)	3:59
9.	"He Got So Much Soul (He Don't Need No Music)"	3:34
10.	"Live at the Barbeque" (featuring Nasty Nas, Joe Fatal and Akinyele)	4:35
11.	"Watch Roger Do His Thing"	4:22
12.	"Just a Friendly Game of Baseball (Remix)" (bonus)	4:02

== Personnel ==
- Main Source – producer, mixing
- Large Professor – vocals
- K-Cut – turntables
- Sir Scratch – turntables
- Pete Rock – associate producer
- Joe Fatal – rap
- Akinyele – rap
- Nas – rap
- Peter Bodtke – photography
- Terry Clarke – design, cover art concept
- Amy Fine – art direction
- Chris Gehringer – mastering
- Tony Papa Michael – engineer
- Anton Pukshansky – bass, engineer, mixing

== Singles ==
Title	Single information
"Looking at the Front Door"	Released: October 25, 1990; B-side: "Watch Roger Do His Thing"
"Watch Roger Do His Thing"	Released: 1990; B-side: "The Large Professor"
"Just Hangin' Out"	Released: May 14, 1991; B-side: "Live at the Barbeque"
"Peace Is Not the Word to Play"	Released: October 22, 1991; B-side: Video Remix / Instrumental

== Chart history ==
=== Album ===
Chart (1991)	Peak position
U.S. Top R&B/Hip-Hop Albums	40

=== Singles ===
Year	Single	Peak position
Year	Single	Hot Rap Singles
1990	"Just Hangin' Out"	11
1990	"Looking at the Front Door"	1
