= Stezo =

American rapper (1968–2020)

Stephen Jerome Williams (March 10, 1968 – April 29, 2020), known by his stage name Stezo, was an American rapper and producer.

== Career ==
Stezo was born Stephen Williams in 1968 in New Haven, Connecticut. He first appeared on the hip-hop scene as a dancer for the group EPMD. He appeared in the video for EPMD's single "You Gots to Chill" from their 1988 album Strictly Business. After this experience Stezo sought a career as a hip-hop artist on his own.

In 1989, Stezo signed a record deal with Sleeping Bag Records and released his 12-inch single "To the Max" and eventually a full album Crazy Noise. Stezo handled all rapping and production on the album. The single received some attention around the time it was released. The album charting at #37 on the Billboard R&B albums chart, and received praise for its very funky production and on-point rapping. The album's two singles both charted on Billboard Hot R&B/Hip-Hop Chart.

Despite the success of his debut album, Stezo didn't release more music for five years. In 1994, he released the single "Bop Ya Headz"/"Shining Star". Then in 1997 he released his follow-up album Where's the Funk At. The album received little attention and did not chart. In 2005, Stezo released a third album, C.T. (The Lost State), paying homage to his home state of Connecticut.

Stezo died in his sleep on April 29, 2020, at age 52, from heart complications at his home in North Carolina.

== Discography ==
=== Albums ===
- Crazy Noise (1989) – U.S. Hot R&B/Hip-Hop Albums #37
- Where's the Funk At (1997)
- C.T. (The Lost State) (2005)
- The Last Dance (2021)

=== Singles ===
Year	Title	Hot Rap Songs	Hot R&B/ Hip-Hop	Dance Club Songs
1989	"To the Max"	-	-	39
1989	"It's My Turn"	18	57	-
1989	"Freak the Funk"	-	85	-
1994	"Bop Ya Headz"	-	-	-
1996	"Where's the Funk At"	-	-	-
1996	"Time ta Blow Ya Mine"	-	-	-
1997	"Mr S."	-	-	-
2004	"Piece of the Pie"	-	-	-
