= Wild Pitch Records =

Defunct American record label

- Founded: 1985; 41 years ago
- Founder: Stu Fine
- Defunct: 1999
- Distributor: EMI Records
- Genre: Golden age hip-hop
- Country of origin: United States
- Location: New York City, New York, US

Wild Pitch Records was an American Golden age hip-hop record label, started in 1987 by Stuart Fine, that was eventually distributed by EMI. Artists who released records on the label included Gang Starr, Chill Rob G, Lord Finesse & DJ Mike Smooth, Main Source, The U.M.C.'s, Hard Knocks, Brokin English Klik, Street Military, Super Lover Cee & Casanova Rud, The Coup, Ultramagnetic MCs, O.C., as well as Latee, Jamose, and female rapper N-Tyce.

Together, Fine and Howard re-established and released the label's catalogue, while also releasing records by Bigmouth, The Wallmen, Mary Lee's Corvette and Mighty Purple. The hip-hop catalogue was eventually acquired by Jay Faires, who tried to reactivate it as part of his short-lived JCOR Entertainment label.

As the majority of its albums were released in the early 1990s and went out of print, Faires re-released the label's catalog on April 22, 2008, through Fontana Distribution.

In 2013, Complex placed Stu Fine at No. 25 of their 'The 25 Best A&Rs in Hip-Hop History' list.

== Discography ==
=== Studio albums ===
Year	Album details	Peak chart positions			
Year	Album details	US	US R&B	UK	UK R&B
1980s	Gang Starr – No More Mr. Nice Guy: Released: April 22, 1989	—	83	—	—
1980s	Chill Rob G – Ride the Rhythm: Released: May 23, 1989	—	60	—	—
1990s	Lord Finesse & DJ Mike Smooth – Funky Technician: Released: February 6, 1990	—	93	—	—
1990s	Main Source – Breaking Atoms: Released: July 23, 1991	—	40	—	—
1990s	The U.M.C.'s – Fruits of Nature: Released: October 15, 1991	—	32	—	—
1990s	Hard Knocks – School of Hard Knocks: Released: 1992; Label: EMI	—	—	—	—
1990s	Brokin English Klik – Brokin English Klik: Released: April 20, 1993; Label: EMI	—	—	—	—
1990s	The Coup – Kill My Landlord: Released: May 4, 1993; Label: EMI	—	83	—	—
1990s	Ultramagnetic MCs – The Four Horsemen: Released: August 10, 1993; Label: EMI	—	55	—	—
1990s	The U.M.C.'s – Unleashed: Released: January 25, 1994; Label: EMI	—	63	—	—
1990s	Main Source – Fuck What You Think: Released: March 22, 1994	—	—	—	—
1990s	The Coup – Genocide & Juice: Released: October 13, 1994; Label: EMI	—	62	—	—
1990s	Wild Pitch Classics: Released: April 12, 1994; Label: EMI	—	—	—	—
1990s	O.C. – Word...Life: Released: October 18, 1994; Label: EMI	—	34	—	—
1990s	Bigmouth – Bigmouth: Released: August 5, 1997	—	—	—	—
1990s	Bryan Steele Group – Bryan Steele Group: Released: 1997	—	—	—	—
1990s	Wallmen – Electronic Home Entertainment System: Released: March 10, 1998	—	—	—	—
1990s	Mary Lee's Corvette – True Lovers of Adventure: Released: March 23, 1999	—	—	—	—
1990s	Mighty Purple – Para Mejor ó Peor...Mighty Purple Live: Released: March 9, 1999	—	—	—	—
"—" denotes a recording that did not chart or was not released in that territory.

=== Extended plays ===
Year	Album details	Peak chart positions			
Year	Album details	US	US R&B	UK	UK R&B
1993	Street Military – Don't Give a Damn: Released: June 29, 1993	—	—	—	—
1993	Super Lover Cee & Casanova Rud – Blow Up the Spot: Released: June 29, 1993	—	—	—	—
"—" denotes a recording that did not chart or was not released in that territory.

=== Singles ===
- 1987: Gang Starr — "The Lesson"
- 1987: LeMonier — "The Hardest Beat Around"
- 1987: Latee — "This Cut's Got Flavor"
- 1987: Gang Starr — "Believe Dat!"
- 1988: Chill Rob G — "Dope Rhymes"
- 1988: Latee — "No Tricks"
- 1988: Artomatik — "Free"
- 1988: Kool D & Technolo-G — "Now Dance"
- 1988: Gang Starr — "Movin' On"
- 1988: Trybe — "Psychedelic Shack"
- 1989: Chill Rob G — "Court Is Now in Session"
- 1989: Gang Starr — "Words I Manifest"
- 1989: Jamose — "Dance to the Megablast"
- 1989: Lord Finesse & DJ Mike Smooth — "Baby, You Nasty"
- 1989: Gang Starr — "Positivity"
- 1990: Chill Rob G — "Let Me Show You"
- 1990: Power Jam & Chill Rob G — "The Power"
- 1990: Lord Finesse & DJ Mike Smooth — "Strictly for the Ladies"/"Back to Back Rhyming"
- 1990: Main Source — "Looking at the Front Door"
- 1990: N-Tyce — "Black to the Point"/"Chinese Eyes"
- 1991: Main Source — "Just Hangin' Out"
- 1991: The U.M.C.'s — "Blue Cheese"/"Anyway the Wind Blows"
- 1991: Elements of Style — "That's the Kind of Girl"/"Walking in Harmony"
- 1991: Main Source — "Peace Is Not the Word to Play"
- 1991: Hard Knocks — "Nigga for Hire"
- 1991: The U.M.C.'s — "One to Grow On"
- 1992: Main Source — "Fakin' the Funk"
- 1992: Hard Knocks — "Dirty Cop Named Harry"
- 1992: The U.M.C.'s — "Never Never Land"
- 1992: Ultramagnetic MCs — "Two Brothers With Checks (San Francisco, Harvey)"
- 1993: N-Tyce — "Walk a Little Closer"/"Peace Ride"
- 1993: Brokin English Klik — "Who's da Gangsta?"
- 1993: The Coup — "Dig It"
- 1993: The Coup — "Funk"
- 1993: The U.M.C.'s — "Time To Set It Straight"/"Ill Demonic Clique"
- 1993: Main Source — "What You Need"
- 1993: Brokin English Klik — "Hard Core Beats"/"Here Come da Hoods"
- 1993: The Coup — "Not Yet Free"
- 1993: Ultramagnetic MCs — "Raise It Up"/"The Saga of Dandy, The Devil and Day"
- 1993: N-Tyce — "Hush Hush Tip"/"Root Beer Float"
- 1994: The Coup — "Takin' These"
- 1994: O.C. — "Born 2 Live"
- 1994: O.C. — "Time's Up"
- 1994: The U.M.C.'s — "Hit the Track"
- 1995: N-Tyce — "Sure Ya Right"
- 1995: The Coup — "Fat Cats, Bigga Fish"
