= Tom Morello discography =

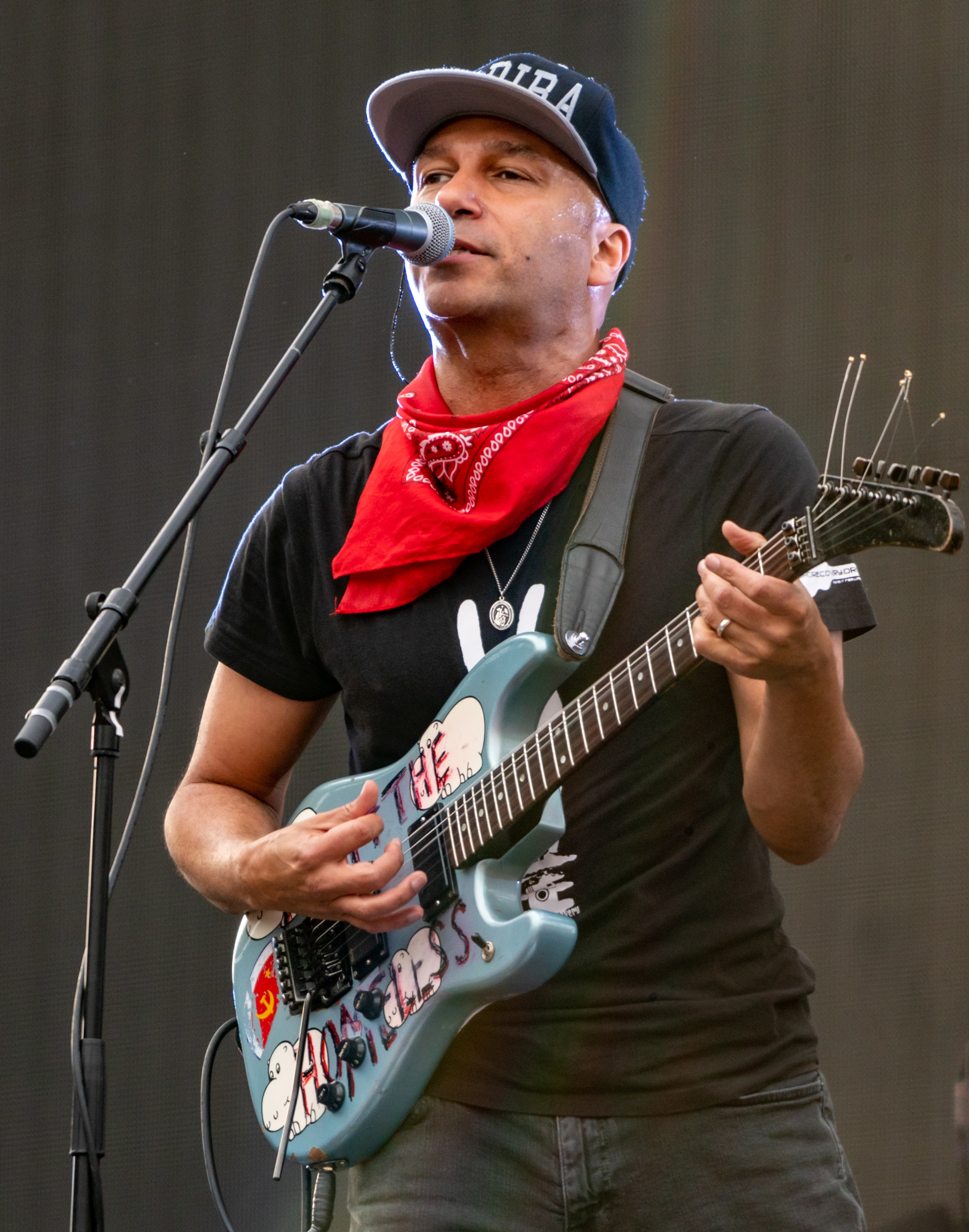
Morello performing in 2019

This is the discography of Tom Morello, an American rock guitarist who is most known for his work with the bands Rage Against the Machine, Audioslave, Street Sweeper Social Club and as his folk alter-ego The Nightwatchman. Morello started playing guitar in the mid 80's in the band Electric Sheep together with future Tool guitarist Adam Jones on bass. After graduating cum laude from Harvard University in 1986 with a BA in political science, he moved to Los Angeles, where he briefly worked as an aide to Senator Alan Cranston. Later Adam Jones moved to L.A. as well; Morello introduced Jones and Maynard James Keenan to Danny Carey, who would come to form the band Tool. In the late 80's Morello was recruited to replace original guitar player Mike Livingston in the rock band Lock Up. In 1989 the band released its only album Something Bitchin' This Way Comes. In 1991, Morello left Lock Up to start a new band. After being impressed by Zack de la Rocha freestyle rapping, he invited him to join. He also recruited Brad Wilk, who had previously auditioned as a drummer for Lock Up. Zack convinced his childhood friend Tim Commerford to join as the band's bass player.

Rage Against the Machine released their self-titled debut album Rage Against the Machine in 1992, which became a commercial success, leading to a slot at Lollapalooza in 1993. Four years later the band released their follow-up record Evil Empire. The band's third album The Battle of Los Angeles was released in 1999. During their initial nine-year run, they became one of the most popular and influential political bands in contemporary music. After the band break up in 2000, the band released their fourth studio album Renegades, which is composed entirely of cover songs. Vocalist Zack de la Rocha started a low-key solo career; while Morello and the rest of the band formed the rock supergroup Audioslave with former Soundgarden frontman Chris Cornell.

Audioslave released their self-titled debut album in 2002, critics initially described Audioslave as an amalgamation of Rage Against the Machine and Soundgarden, but with the band's second album, Out of Exile, noted that the band had established its own separate identity. The band's trademark sound was created by blending 1970s hard rock with 1990s grunge. Morello also incorporated his well-known, unconventional guitar solos into the band's sound. After Audioslave released three successful albums, received three Grammy nominations, and became the first American rock band to perform an open-air concert in Cuba, Cornell issued a statement in February 2007 that he was permanently leaving the band "due to irresolvable personality conflicts as well as musical differences".

After a seven-year hiatus, Rage Against the Machine reunited in January 2007 at the Coachella Festival and have has continued to perform at multiple live venues since, however, according to Morello, Rage Against the Machine has no plans to record new material.

In 2003 Morello created the identity of The Nightwatchman, an "artist of the people," when a desire to return to political activism in his music struck him, after over a year of playing non-activist rock in Audioslave. Morello first began playing political acoustic folk music in a Los Angeles coffeehouse before a small crowd, and soon after went on Billy Bragg's Tell Us the Truth tour. He initially had no plans to record, but later recorded the song "No One Left" for Songs and Artists that Inspired Fahrenheit 9/11 In 2007, Morello announced his solo album, One Man Revolution, which was released on April 24 in the US and May 7 worldwide. Late 2008 Morello released his second studio album The Fabled City, which features guest appearances by Serj Tankian, Shooter Jennings and Perry Farrell.

== Album appearances ==
Band or pseudonym	Year	Album details	Peak chart positions															Certifications (sales thresholds)
Band or pseudonym	Year	Album details	US	AUS	AUT	CAN	DEN	FIN	FRA	GER	IRE	NOR	NLD	NZ	SWE	SWI	UK	Certifications (sales thresholds)
Lock Up	1989	Something Bitchin' This Way Comes: Released: July 1989; Label: Geffen Records; Formats: CD	—	—	—	—	—	—	—	—	—	—	—	—	—	—	—	
Rage Against the Machine	1992	Rage Against the Machine: Released: November 3, 1992; Label: Epic (ZK 52959); Formats: CD, CS, LP	45	12	—	—	—	—	43	22	24	—	5	9	22	16	17	US: 3× Platinum; AUS: Gold; CAN: Platinum; UK: Gold
Rage Against the Machine	1996	Evil Empire: Released: April 16, 1996; Label: Epic (EK 57523); Formats: CD, CS, LP	1	2	2	4	—	5	26	2	—	2	4	3	1	4	4	US: 3× Platinum; CAN: Platinum; UK: Silver
Rage Against the Machine	1999	The Battle of Los Angeles: Released: November 2, 1999; Label: Epic (EK 69630); Formats: CD, CS, LP	1	2	17	1	—	2	10	7	—	2	28	1	4	15	23	US: 2× Platinum; AUS: Platinum; CAN: 2× Platinum
Rage Against the Machine	2000	Renegades: Released: December 5, 2000; Label: Epic (EK 85289); Formats: CD, CS, LP	14	10	66	13	—	25	—	47	—	—	—	—	—	49	71	US: Platinum; AUS: Platinum
Audioslave	2002	Audioslave: Release: November 19, 2002; Label: Epic, Interscope (EK 86968); Format: CD, LP	7	8	53	6	37	28	51	39	21	5	30	4	14	34	12	US: 3× Platinum; AUS: Platinum; CAN: 2× Platinum; UK: Gold
Audioslave	2005	Out of Exile: Release: May 24, 2005; Label: Epic, Interscope (B0004603–02); Format: CD, LP	1	3	8	1	5	5	31	6	3	1	10	1	2	7	5	US: Platinum; AUS: Platinum; CAN: Platinum
Audioslave	2006	Revelations: Release: September 5, 2006; Label: Epic, Interscope (82876–89777–2); Format: CD (+DVD), LP	2	1	6	1	6	2	46	8	7	5	21	1	6	8	12	US: Gold; AUS: Gold; CAN: Gold
Axis of Justice	2004	Axis of Justice: Concert Series Volume 1: Release: November 16, 2004; Label: Columbia/Serjical Strike/Axis of Justice; Format: CD	—	—	—	—	—	—	—	—	—	—	—	—	—	—	—	
The Nightwatchman	2007	One Man Revolution: Release: April 24, 2007; Label: Epic; Format: CD	119	—	—	—	—	—	—	—	—	—	—	—	—	—	—	
The Nightwatchman	2008	The Fabled City: Release: September 30, 2008; Label: Epic; Format: CD	180	—	—	—	—	—	—	—	—	—	—	—	—	—	—	
The Nightwatchman	2011	Union Town: Release: May 17, 2011; Label: New West Records; Format: CD	—	—	—	—	—	—	—	—	—	—	—	—	—	—	—	
The Nightwatchman	2011	World Wide Rebel Songs: Release: August 30, 2011; Label: New West Records; Format: CD	—	—	—	—	—	—	—	—	—	—	—	—	—	—	—	
Street Sweeper Social Club	2009	Street Sweeper Social Club: Release: June 19, 2009; Label: Warner Music Group; Format: CD	37	—	—	—	—	—	—	—	—	—	—	—	—	—	—	
Street Sweeper Social Club	2010	The Ghetto Blaster EP: Release: July 27, 2010; Label: Warner Music Group; Format: CD, EP	—	—	—	—	—	—	—	—	—	—	—	—	—	—	—	
Prophets of Rage	2017	Prophets of Rage: Released: September 15, 2017; Label: Fantasy, Caroline; Formats: CD, LP	16	11	12	17	—	—	16	14	16	—	36	4	—	3	6	
Tom Morello	2018	The Atlas Underground: Released: October 12, 2018; Label: Mom + Pop Music; Format: CD	141	90	—	—	—	—	—	—	—	—	—	—	—	—	—	
Tom Morello	2020	Comandante: Released: October 28, 2020; Label: Format: CD	—	—	—	—	—	—	—	—	—	—	—	—	—	—	—	
Tom Morello	2021	The Atlas Underground Fire: Release: October 15, 2021; Label: Comandante, Mom + Pop; Format: CD, digital download	—	—	—	—	—	—	—	—	—	—	—	—	—	—	—	
Tom Morello	2021	The Atlas Underground Flood: Release: December 3, 2021	—	—	—	—	—	—	—	—	—	—	—	—	—	—	—	
Tom Morello	2026	Everyone Gets Everything They Want: Release: September 25, 2026	—	—	—	—	—	—	—	—	—	—	—	—	—	—	—	
"—" denotes a recording that did not chart or was not released.

== EPs ==
Year	EP details
2020	=== Comandante === : Release: October 30, 2020; Label: Tom Morello
2021	=== The Catastrophists EP === : Release: June 18, 2021; Label: Comandante LLC

== Singles ==
Year	Single details
2014	=== Marching on Ferguson === : Release: October 14, 2014; Label: Comandante LLC
2018	=== Battle Sirens (feat. Knife Party) === : Release: July 26, 2018; Label: Comandante LLC
2018	=== We Don't Need You (feat, Vic Mensa) === : Release: July 26, 2018; Label: Comandante LLC
2018	=== Rabbit's Revenge (feat. Bassnectar, Big Boi, Killer Mike) === : Release: August 10, 2018; Label: Comandante LLC
2018	=== Lucky One (feat. K.Flay) === : Release: September 7, 2018; Label: Comandante LLC
2018	=== Every Step That I Take (feat. Portugal. The Man, Whethan) === : Release: October 5, 2018; Label: Comandante LLC
2018	=== A Higher Frequency (feat. Serj Tankian, Attlas) === : Release: November 23, 2018; Label: Comandante LLC
2019	=== Can't Stop The Bleeding (feat. Gary Clark Jr., Gramatik) === : Release: April 5, 2019; Label: Comandante LLC
2020	=== Save the Hammer for the Man (SongAid) [Live] (feat. Carl Restivo) === : Release: May 29, 2020; Label: SongAid
2020	=== Stand Up (feat. Shea Diamond, Dan Reynolds, The Bloody Beetroots) === : Release: July 2, 2020; Label: Kidinakorner, Interscope Records
2020	=== You Belong to Me === : Release: August 14, 2020; Label: Comandante LLC
2021	=== Natural's Not in It (feat. Serj Tankian, Gang of Four) === : Release: January 8, 2021; Label: Gill Music Ltd.
2021	=== Weather Strike (feat. Pussy Riot) === : Release: April 30, 2021; Label: Comandante LLC
2021	=== Radium Girls (feat. The Bloody Beetroots, Pussy Riot, === === The Last Internationale, Aimee Interrupter, White Lung) === : Release: June 4, 2021; Label: Comandante LLC
2021	=== Highway to Hell (feat. Bruce Springsteen, Eddie Vedder) === : Release: August 4, 2021; Label: Comandante LLC
2021	=== Driving to Texas (feat. Phantogram) === : Release: August 25, 2021; Label: Comandante LLC
2021	=== Let's Get The Party Started (feat. Bring Me the Horizon) === : Release: September 22, 2021; Label: Comandante LLC
2021	=== The War Inside (feat. Chris Stapleton) === : Release October 14, 2021; Label: Comandante LLC
2022	=== Raising Hell (feat. Ben Harper) === : Release: March 16, 2022; Label: Comandante LLC
2022	=== Come On Up To The House (feat. X Ambassadors) === : Release: March 16, 2022; Label: Comandante LLC
2024	=== Soldier In The Army of Love === : Release: June 28, 2024; Label: Comandante LLC
2024	=== One Last Dance (feat. grandson) === : Release: October 25, 2024; Label: Comandante LLC
2025	=== Pretend You Remember Me === : Release: July 10, 2025; Label: Comandante LLC
2025	=== Everything Burns (feat. Beartooth) === : Release: December 17, 2025; Label: Comandante LLC
2026	=== Adjourn It (feat. Serj Tankian) === : Release: May 29, 2026; Label: Comandante LLC
2026	=== Date Night === : Release: July 29, 2026; Label: Comandante LLC

== Collaborations ==
Year	Band or artist	Album or song	Ref.
1993	Run-DMC	Down with the King	
1994	Shandi's Addiction	Kiss My Ass: Classic Kiss Regrooved	
1996	KRS-One	Rappaz R. N. Dainja	
1996	Snoop Doggy Dogg	Snoop Bounce (Roc N Roll Remix)	
1997	The Prodigy	One Man Army/No Man Army	
1998	Sean Combs	Come with Me	
1998	Indigo Girls	Shed Your Skin	
1998	Joe Strummer	Chef Aid: The South Park Album	
1998	Bone Thugs-n-Harmony	War	
1999	Primus	Antipop	
1999	Class of '99	The Faculty Soundtrack	
1999	Perry Farrell	Rev (Perry Farrell album)	
1999	Atari Teenage Riot	Rage E.P.	
2000	Wu-Tang Clan	Wu-Tang Clan Ain't Nothing Ta Fuck Wit	
2000	Cypress Hill	(Rap) Superstar	
2001	The Crystal Method	Tweekend	
2001	Made Soundtrack	Katwalk (Morello Mix)	
2002	Cypress Hill	Stash: This Is the Remix	
2002	Bubba Sparxxx and The Crystal Method	Blade II Soundtrack	
2002	Macy Gray	Spider-Man Soundtrack	
2003	Johnny Cash	Unearthed	
2003	Anti-Flag	The Terror State	
2006	The Coup	Pick a Bigger Weapon	
2006	The Crystal Method	Drive	
2007	Dave Matthews Band	Live Trax Vol. 10	
2007	Tool	Live at Bonnaroo	
2007	Puscifer	Cuntry Boner	
2008	Various artists	Iron Man Soundtrack	
2008	Jason Heath & The Greedy Souls	The Vain Hope of Horse (2 tracks)	
2008	Bruce Springsteen	Magic Tour Highlights	
2009	Outernational	"Fighting Song"	
2009	Steve Earle	"Townes"	
2010	Cypress Hill	Rise Up	
2010	Outernational	"Deportees"	
2011	Travis Barker	"Carry It"	
2011	Serj Tankian	Imperfect Remixes	
2011	Various artists	Note of Hope ― A Celebration of Woody Guthrie	
2012	Bruce Springsteen	Wrecking Ball	
2012	Rise Against	"The Ghost of Tom Joad" (Bruce Springsteen cover)	
2012	Steve Jablonsky	Battleship ― "Super Battle" and "Thug Fight" (with Steve Jablonsky)	
2012	Outernational	"Todos Somos Ilegalles"	
2013	Device	Opinion	
2013	John Fogerty	"Wrote a Song for Everyone"	
2013	Calle 13	Multi_Viral	
2013	LL Cool J	"Whaddup" (featuring Chuck D, Travis Barker and Z-Trip)	
2014	Bruce Springsteen	High Hopes	
2014	Linkin Park	"Drawbar"	
2015	GZA	"The Mexican" (featuring K.I.D)	
2015	Ike Reilly	"Paradise Lane"	
2015	Raury	"Friends"	
2016	X Ambassadors	"Collider"	
2016	Knife Party	Battle Sirens	
2018	K.Flay	Lucky One	
2018	Gigi Meroni feat. Tom Morello	"Una vita spericolata" (soundtrack)	
2019	Frank Carter & The Rattlesnakes	"Tyrant Lizard King"	
2019	5 Seconds of Summer	"Teeth"	
2020	Tom Morello featuring Shea Diamond, Dan Reynolds and The Bloody Beetroots	"Stand Up"	
2021	DJ Free Leonard featuring Tom Morello, Leonard Peltier	"Traditional Way of Life"	
2021	The Pretty Reckless	"And So It Went"	
2021	K.Flay featuring Tom Morello	"TGIF"	
2021	Pussy Riot	"Weather Strike"	
2021	Tom Morello featuring Bring Me the Horizon	"Let's Get the Party Started"	
2023	Måneskin	"Gossip"	
2023	Alice Cooper	"White Line Frankenstein"	
2023	Babymetal featuring Tom Morello	"Metali!! (メタり！！)"	
2024	Sheryl Crow	"Evolution"	
2024	Def Leppard featuring Tom Morello	"Just Like 73"	
2024	MC5	"Heavy Lifting"	
2024	Stray Kids, Young Miko and Tom Morello	"Come Play"	
2025	DJ Free Leonard featuring Tom Morello	"Communities Are Not Commodities"	
2025	Gustavo Santaolalla featuring Tom Morello	"The Path"	
