= Live at Lime with Tom Morello: The Nightwatchman =

Live album by the Nightwatchman
- Released: December 11, 2009
- Recorded: 2009
- Studio: Galt Line Music, Los Angeles
- Genre: Folk rock, acoustic rock

The Nightwatchman chronology
The Fabled City (2008)	Live at Lime with Tom Morello: The Nightwatchman (2009)	Union Town (2011)

Live at Lime with Tom Morello: The Nightwatchman is a two-track benefit album by the Nightwatchman, the alter ego of Tom Morello. Both songs on the album are covers – The Killers' "Human" and Alfred Hayes' "Joe Hill" – which is a first for a Nightwatchman album. It was recorded in 2009 and released by LimeWire Store on December 11, 2009, as a benefit for Amnesty International. Net proceeds from this release are being donated to the organization.

It's been said that if you don't stand for something, you'll fall for anything... For Live at Lime with Tom Morello: The Nightwatchman, a release benefiting Amnesty International, the master axeman presents two striking acoustic covers: a gorgeous, sparse rendition of The Killers' "Human" and "Joe Hill," a classic folk song based on a poem written by Alfred Hayes in 1925 about Swedish-American labor activist Joe Hill. ¡Viva la Revolución!

— Darren Ressler, LimeWire Store

== Track listing ==
No.	Title	Length
1.	"Human" (The Killers cover)	3:47
2.	"Joe Hill" (Alfred Hayes cover)	3:24

== Personnel ==
- Tom Morello – lead guitar, vocals, harmonica
- David Gibbs – rhythm guitar
- Eric Robinson – piano
