= Union Town (album) =

EP by The Nightwatchman
- Released: July 19, 2011
- Recorded: March 2011 at Veritas Studios, Los Angeles, CA
- Genre: Folk rock, acoustic rock, anti-folk, protest music
- Label: New West
- Producer: Tom Morello

The Nightwatchman chronology
The Fabled City (2008)	Union Town (2011)	World Wide Rebel Songs (2011)

Professional ratings
Review scores
Source	Rating
Allmusic	3.5/5 stars

Union Town is an EP by The Nightwatchman, alter ego of musician Tom Morello. It is his third release as the Nightwatchman overall, and includes many covers of famous union songs, including "Solidarity Forever" and "Which Side Are You On?". Unlike Morello's previous efforts, the EP was self-produced by Morello himself, and is his first release on the New West Records label.

The EP is the first to feature Carl Restivo, Dave Gibbs and Eric Gardner as part of Morello's backing band, known as The Freedom Fighters Orchestra. All the three of them are also members in Morello's band Street Sweeper Social Club.

== Track listing ==
No.	Title	Writer(s)	Length
1.	"Union Town"	Tom Morello	3:07
2.	"Solidarity Forever"	Ralph Chaplin	2:38
3.	"Which Side Are You On?"	Florence Reece	5:00
4.	"A Wall Against the Wind"	Morello	3:16
5.	"16 Tons"	Merle Travis	3:35
6.	"This Land Is Your Land"	Woody Guthrie	3:40
7.	"I Dreamed I Saw Joe Hill Last Night"	Alfred Hayes	3:09
8.	"Union Song" (Live in Madison, WI)	Morello	5:36

== Personnel ==
- Tom Morello - guitars, lead vocals, harmonica
- Carl Restivo - bass, backing vocals
- Eric Gardner - drums, percussion, backing vocals
- Chris Joyner - piano, keyboards, backing vocals
- Ed Roth - organ
- Wayne Kramer - backing vocals
- Anne Preven - backing vocals
- Mary Morello - backing vocals
- Rhoads Morello - backing vocals
- Diana Molina - backing vocals
- Sean Ricigliano - backing vocals
- Whitnee Patterson - backing vocals

Production

- Produced by Tom Morello
- Recorded by Kevin Mills at Veritas Studio, Los Angeles, California
- Mixed by Ryan Hewitt at Lock Stock Studio, Los Angeles, CA
