= The Atlas Underground Flood =

Studio album by Tom Morello
- Released: December 3, 2021
- Recorded: 2021
- Label: Mom + Pop Music

Tom Morello chronology
The Atlas Underground Fire (2021)	The Atlas Underground Flood (2021)	Everyone Gets Everything They Want (2026)

Professional ratings
Review scores
Source	Rating
Guitar.com	3 /5 stars
NME	4 /5 stars
Kerrang!	3/5 stars

The Atlas Underground Flood is the third collaborative album by American rock musician Tom Morello. The album was released on December 3, 2021, and features guest appearances from San Holo, Barns Courtney, Nathaniel Rateliff, Jim Jones, Chipotle Joe, X Ambassadors, Alex Lifeson, Kirk Hammett, Dr. Fresch, Manchester Orchestra, Andrew McMahon In The Wilderness, BreakCode, Ben Harper, IDLES, Jim James, and Rodrigo y Gabriela.

== Track listing ==
No.	Title	Writer(s)	Producer(s)	Length
1.	"A Radical in the Family" (featuring San Holo)	Tom Morello; Sander Van Dijck	San Holo; Carl Restivo (add.)	3:45
2.	"Human" (featuring Barns Courtney)	Morello; Gregg Wattenberg; Barnes Courtney; Sam Hollander	Gregg Wattenberg	3:04
3.	"Hard Times" (featuring Nathaniel Rateliff, Jim Jones, and Chipotle Joe)	Morello; Nathaniel Rateliff; Joseph Jones; Joseph Lee; Michael Cash	M.A. Cash	2:43
4.	"You'll Get Yours" (featuring X Ambassadors)	Morello; David Greenbaum; Sam Harris	David Greenbaum; Restivo (add.)	3:09
5.	"I Have Seen the Way" (featuring Alex Lifeson, Kirk Hammett, and Dr. Fresch)	Morello; Alex Lifeson; Kirk Hammett; Anthony Michael Fresch	Dr. Fresch; Restivo	3:47
6.	"The Lost Cause" (featuring Manchester Orchestra)	Morello; John Andrew Hull; Robert McDowell	Andy Hull; Robert McDowell; Restivo (add.)	4:27
7.	"The Maze" (Andrew McMahon In The Wilderness)	Morello; Andrew McMahon; Chris Walla	Suzy Shinn; Charlie Brand (add.)	4:10
8.	"Ride at Dawn" (featuring BreakCode)	Morello; Jon Rundell; Tom Dekkers	Jon Rundell; Tom Dekkers; Morello	3:58
9.	"Raising Hell" (featuring Ben Harper)	Morello; Kevin Griffin; Hollander	Austin Ward; Kevin Griffin (add.)	3:21
10.	"The Bachelor" (featuring IDLES)	Morello; IDLES	Mark Bowen	2:58
11.	"Parallels" (featuring Jim James)	Morello; Jim James; Eric Louis Gardner; Dave Gibbs	Jim James	4:30
12.	"Warrior Spirit" (featuring Rodrigo y Gabriela)	Morello; Rodrigo Sánchez; Gabriela Quintero	Restivo	3:18
Total length:				43:10
