= The Atlas Underground Fire =

Studio album by Tom Morello
- Released: October 15, 2021
- Recorded: 2021
- Length: 46:22
- Label: Mom + Pop Music

Tom Morello chronology
The Atlas Underground (2018)	The Atlas Underground Fire (2021)	The Atlas Underground Flood (2021)

The Atlas Underground Fire is the second collaborative album by American rock musician Tom Morello. The album was released on October 15, 2021, and features guest appearances from Bring Me the Horizon, Bruce Springsteen and Eddie Vedder, Grandson, Phantogram, Damian Marley, Mike Posner, Chris Stapleton, Phem, Protohype, Dennis Lyxzén of Refused and Sama' Abdulhadi.

== Critical reception ==
Professional ratings
Aggregate scores
Source	Rating
Metacritic	66/100
Review scores
Source	Rating
Classic Rock	3/5 stars
DIY	3.5/5 stars
Glide	2/5 stars
Kerrang!	3/5
NME	4/5 stars

Wall of Sound rated the album 7/10, stating that "not every songs sticks" and that Morello was "playing in a lot of different sandpits ... but there's a lot to like here".

== Track listing ==
No.	Title	Writer(s)	Producer(s)	Length
1.	"Harlem Hellfighter"	Tom Morello; Jon Levine	Jon Levine	1:59
2.	"Highway to Hell" (featuring Bruce Springsteen and Eddie Vedder)	Angus Young; Malcolm Young; Ronald Belford Scott	Zakk Cervini; Carl Restivo (add.); Ron Aniello (voc.)	3:31
3.	"Let's Get the Party Started" (featuring Bring Me the Horizon)	Morello; Oliver Sykes; Jordan Fish; Austin Richard Post	Evil Twin; Cervini; Jordan Fish (add.)	3:32
4.	"Driving to Texas" (featuring Phantogram)	Morello; Josh Carter; Sarah Barthel; Dan Wilson	Josh Carter	5:25
5.	"The War Inside" (featuring Chris Stapleton)	Morello; Chris Stapleton	Dave Cobb; Chris Stapleton	3:49
6.	"Hold the Line" (featuring Grandson)	Morello; Jordan Benjamin; Kevin Hissink	Boonn; Cervini	3:12
7.	"Naraka" (featuring Mike Posner)	Morello; Mike Posner	Mike Posner (co.); Ryder Johnson (co.); Restivo (add.)	4:01
8.	"The Achilles List" (featuring Damian Marley)	Morello; Damian Marley; Zane Lowe; Simone Cogo	The Bloody Beetroots; Zane Lowe; Restivo (add.)	2:52
9.	"Night Witch" (featuring Phem)	Morello; David Emerson Dahlquist; Phem	Kill Dave	3:06
10.	"Charmed I'm Sure" (featuring Protohype)	Morello; Max Pote	Max Pote	3:42
11.	"Save Our Souls" (featuring Dennis Lyxzén of Refused)	Morello; Dennis Lyxzén; Cogo	The Bloody Beetroots; Restivo (add.)	2:36
12.	"On the Shore of Eternity" (featuring Sama' Abdulhadi)	Morello; Sama' Abdulhadi	Sama' Abdulhadi	8:38
Total length:				46:22
