= World Wide Rebel Songs =

Studio album by The Nightwatchman
- Released: August 29, 2011
- Recorded: May–June 2011 at Veritas Studios, Los Angeles, CA
- Genre: Folk rock, anti-folk, protest music, folk punk
- Length: 49:54
- Label: New West
- Producer: Tom Morello

Tom Morello chronology
Union Town (2011)	World Wide Rebel Songs (2011)	The Atlas Underground (2018)

Professional ratings
Review scores
Source	Rating
Rolling Stone	3.5/5 stars
Slant Magazine	3/5 stars
Spin	(5/10)

World Wide Rebel Songs is the third full-length studio album by The Nightwatchman, the alter ego of Tom Morello. It was released on August 29, 2011, through Morello's new label New West Records, and like his previous release Union Town, was self-produced.

The album features fellow Street Sweeper Social Club members Carl Restivo and Eric Gardner on guitar and drums, respectively, as well as SSSC bassist Dave Gibbs on backing vocals.

The album's cover is a homage to the cover image on protest singer Phil Ochs' Gunfight at Carnegie Hall.

== Critical response ==
Spin gave it a score of 5/10, calling it, "a Dylan/Guthrie/Seeger/Bragg love letter that fearlessly tangoes betwixt the admirable and the absurd. Only the electric 'It Begins Tonight,' righteous of riff and bonkers of solo, plays to his strengths; the rest is like watching Michael Jordan bat .235 in Birmingham."

== Track listing ==
All tracks are written by Tom Morello, except where noted.

No.	Title	Writer(s)	Length
1.	"Black Spartacus Heart Attack Machine"		3:31
2.	"The Dogs of Tijuana"		3:28
3.	"It Begins Tonight"		3:01
4.	"Save the Hammer for the Man" (feat. Ben Harper)	Morello; Harper	5:17
5.	"The Fifth Horseman of the Apocalypse"		4:36
6.	"Speak and Make Lightning"		3:56
7.	"Facing Mount Kenya"		4:03
8.	"The Whirlwind"		3:59
9.	"Stray Bullets"	Morello; Ryan Harvey	4:03
10.	"Branding Iron"		3:51
11.	"World Wide Rebel Songs"		3:03
12.	"God Help Us All"		3:58
13.	"Union Town"		3:09

== Personnel ==
- The Nightwatchman (Tom Morello) - lead guitar, lead vocals, mandolin, harmonica
- Carl Restivo - rhythm guitar, keyboards, backing vocals
- Chris Joyner - keyboards
- Jonny Polonsky - toy piano
- Eric Gardner - drums, percussion
- Ben Harper - vocals on "Save the Hammer for the Man"
- Dave Gibbs - backing vocals
- Anne Preven - backing vocals
