= Lock Up (American band) =

1987–1990 US musical group

- Origin: Los Angeles, California, United States
- Genres: Heavy metal, glam metal, funk metal, hard rock
- Years active: 1987–1990
- Label: Geffen
- Past members: Mike R. Livingston; Tom Morello; Kevin Wood; Brian Grillo; Brendan Mullen; Michael Lee; D. H. Peligro; Vince Ostertag; Chris Beebe; Jon Knox

Lock Up was a rock band that featured Tom Morello on guitar before Rage Against the Machine was formed.

The band was founded by the original guitar player Mike Livingston (formerly of The Mau Maus) and Kevin Wood on bass. They had previously played together in the band Ella and the Blacks, which also included Brian Grillo and Brendan Mullen (founder of The Masque, the first L.A. punk rock club). Grillo became Lock Up's lead singer. Grillo had worked several years before with Martin Atkins in the latter's Brian Brain project, and then was known in Los Angeles for fronting Brian Grillo's Wild Coyote Review.

The original drummer was Michael Lee, (later drummer with Sylvia Juncosa and with The Homebillies), who quit and was replaced briefly by D. H. Peligro, formerly of the Dead Kennedys and later in Red Hot Chili Peppers. After Peligro left, he was replaced by Vince Ostertag .

In early 1987, Lock Up signed a production deal with Third Story Music, which was the company associated with Herb Cohen, by Evan Cohen, who later ran Manifesto Records. Cohen brought the band to the attention of Anna Statman, who was an A & R person at Slash Records. In 1988, Statman moved to a new job at Geffen Records, and Lock Up was her first signing at Geffen, in mid-1988.

Livingston left Lock Up in late 1987. In early 1988, Livingston was replaced by Morello. Chris Beebe on bass completed the lineup that released Lock Up's sole album on Geffen Records, Something Bitchin' This Way Comes, which came out in 1989. The title of the album was based on Ray Bradbury's 1962 novel Something Wicked This Way Comes. Vince Ostertag was subsequently replaced by Jon Knox who played drums until the group disbanded.

Following the Lock Up break up, Jon encouraged bassist Tim Commerford and Zack de la Rocha to jam with Tom Morello and drummer Brad Wilk who unsuccessfully auditioned for Lock Up. This line-up went on to form Rage Against the Machine.

Most of Morello's guitar with Lock Up is unlike his work with Rage Against the Machine and Audioslave. His solos, in contrast to Livingston's rootsy blues oriented style mainly consist of arpeggios, tapping and overall fast fretwork. Evidence of his experimenting with the toggle switch can be heard in a few tracks ("Can't Stop the Bleeding", "Nothing New" and "Punch Drunk").

The songs "Punch Drunk" and "Half Man Half Beast" were featured in the 1991 comedy film Ski School.

In 1997, Manifesto Records licensed the Lock Up album from Geffen, and released it on compact disc. After the release, Manifesto, Morello, and Morello's label, Sony, got into a legal dispute over whether Manifesto could place a sticker on the compact disc that read "Featuring Tom Morello from Rage Against the Machine."

== Band members ==
- Brian Grillo – lead vocals (1986–1990)
- Tom Morello – guitar (1988–1990)
- Mike Livingston – guitar (1986-1987)
- Kevin Wood – bass (1986-1987)
- Michael Lee – drums (1986-1987)
- D. H. Peligro – drums (1987)
- Vince Ostertag – drums (1988–1990)
- Chris Beebe – bass (1988–1990)
- Jon Knox – drums (1990)

== Discography ==
- Something Bitchin' This Way Comes (1989)

== Notes ==
References

- SPIN
- The A to X of Alternative Music
