= The Nightwatchman =

Solo project by Tom Morello

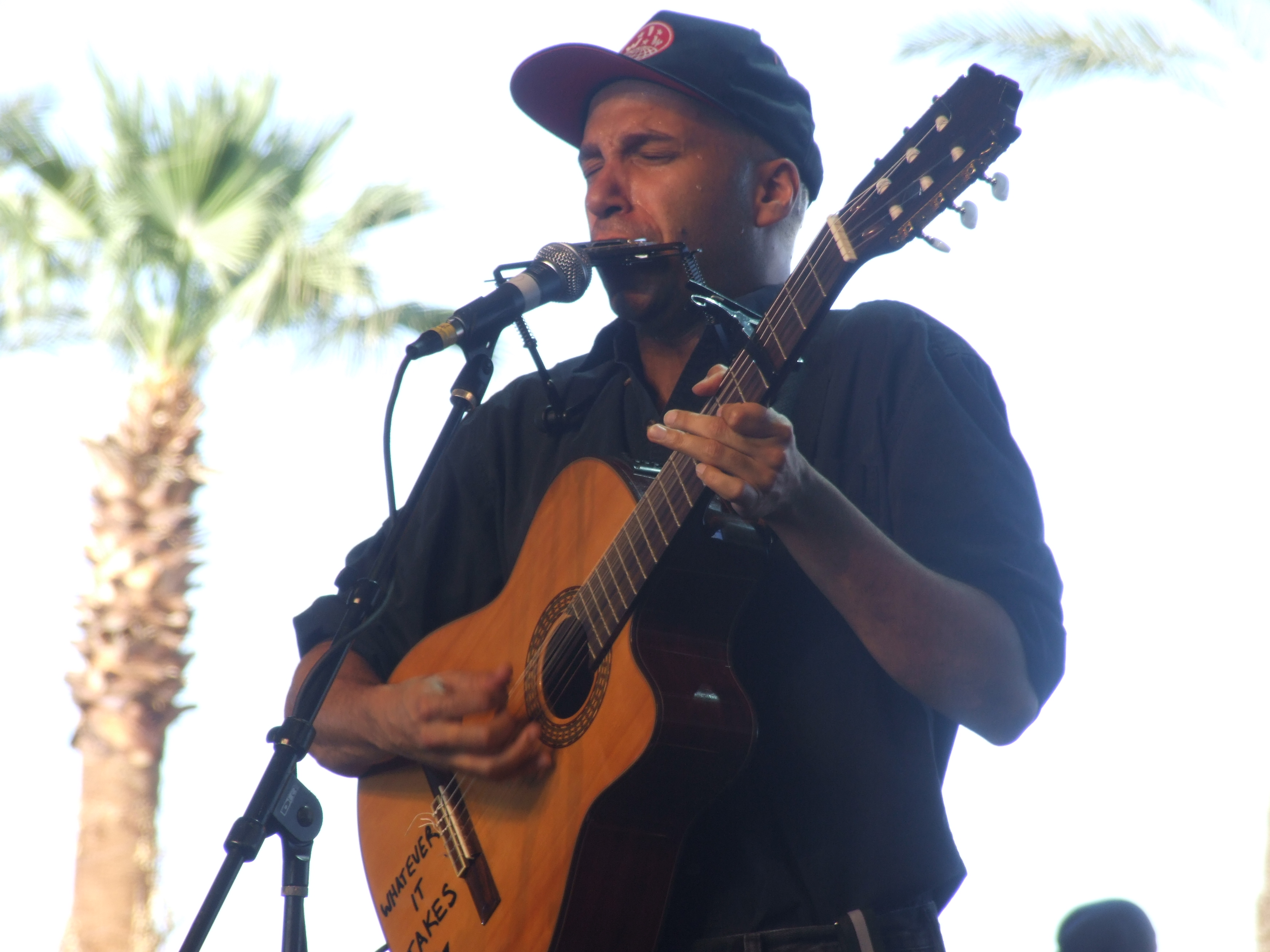
- Tom Morello at Coachella 2007

Background information
- Also known as: Tom Morello: The Nightwatchman
- Origin: Los Angeles, California, U.S.
- Genres: Folk rock; acoustic rock; anti-folk; protest music
- Instruments: Guitar; harmonica; mandolin; vocals
- Years active: 2003–2016
- Label: Epic

The Nightwatchman (also billed as Tom Morello: The Nightwatchman) was the solo project of American musician Tom Morello who is known for his memberships in Rage Against the Machine, Street Sweeper Social Club and Audioslave. Morello began performing as the Nightwatchman in 2003 as an outlet for his political views while he was playing apolitical music with Audioslave.

== Career ==
=== Early career ===
Morello created the identity of the Nightwatchman, inspired by Bruce Springsteen's The Ghost of Tom Joad album, when a desire to return to political activism in his music struck him in 2003, after over a year of playing non-activist rock in Audioslave. Morello describes the Nightwatchman as "the black Robin Hood of 21st century music" and "a reaction against illicit wars, a reaction against first strikes, torture, secret prisons, spying illegally on American citizens. It's a reaction against war crimes, and it's a reaction against a few corporations that grow rich [off] this illicit war while people beg for food in the city streets." He later elaborated that the format was inspired by long-time social and political activist/musician Billy Bragg. Morello first saw him performing at a concert c. 1994, playing "fearlessly" before a crowd of 8,000 people in a tent alongside big-name rock bands of the time. The Nightwatchman first began playing political acoustic folk music in a Los Angeles coffeehouse before a small crowd, and soon after went on Billy Bragg's Tell Us the Truth Tour.

"The Nightwatchman is my political folk alter ego. I've been writing these songs and playing them at open mic nights with friends for some time. This is the first time I've toured with it. When I play open mic nights, I'm announced as the Nightwatchman. There will be kids there who are fans of my electric guitar playing, and you see them there scratching their heads."

— Tom Morello

The Tell Us the Truth Tour was supported by unions, environmental and media reform groups including Common Cause, Free Press and A.F.L.-C.I.O. with the ultimate goal of "informing music fans, and exposing and challenging the failures of the major media outlets in the United States." His Nightwatchman persona has been compared to Woody Guthrie, Bruce Springsteen and Bob Dylan. He initially had no plans to record, but later recorded the song "No One Left" for Songs and Artists that Inspired Fahrenheit 9/11. At the Festival of Bonnaroo in 2007, the Nightwatchman performed Rage Against the Machine song "Guerrilla Radio" to protest George W. Bush.

=== One Man Revolution ===
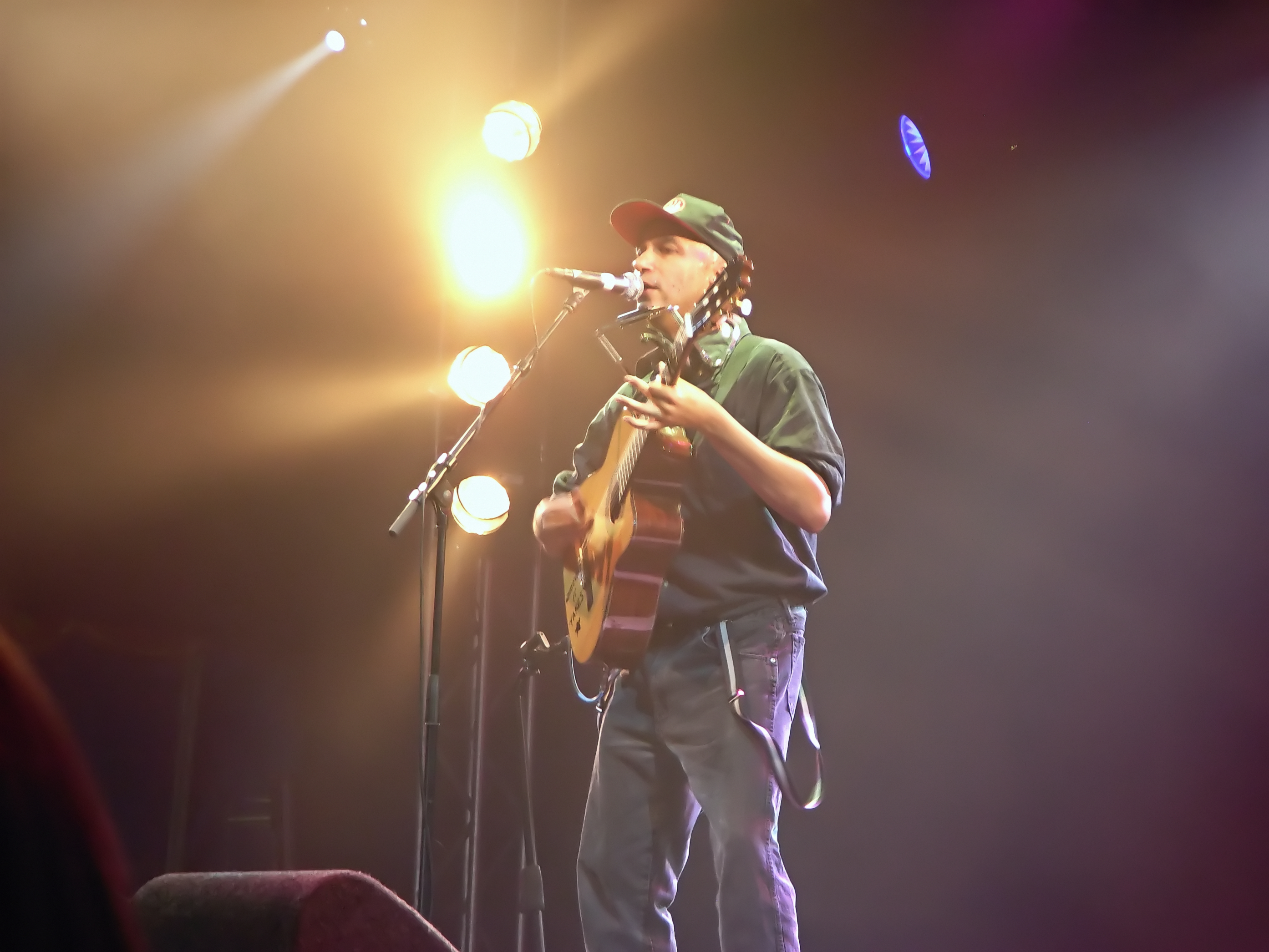
The Nightwatchman at the Pinkpop festival in 2007

In February 2007, he announced a solo album, One Man Revolution, which was released on April 24, 2007, in the US and May 7 worldwide. The Nightwatchman's first headlining gig was played June 17, 2007, at the House of Blues in Dallas, Texas. After seeing an early screening of the Michael Moore film Sicko, Morello wrote the song "Alone Without You", which featured in closing credits of the film and also with a music video directed by Moore in the DVD release. The song was also made available as an iTunes bonus track for One Man Revolution. Morello toured in support of the album as the opening act for Ben Harper. During this tour, Morello joined Harper onstage on several occasions for a cover of Bob Dylan's "Masters of War", on which he plays the electric guitar in the style for which he's best known. Other prominent musicians who Morello shared the stage with during the One Man Revolution tour includes, Serj Tankian, Perry Farrell, Jon Foreman from Switchfoot, Shooter Jennings, Nuno Bettencourt, Sen Dog from Cypress Hill, Jill Sobule, Boots Riley, Alexi Murdoch, Wayne Kramer from MC5, Slash and many others.

=== The Fabled City ===
Morello's second solo album, The Fabled City, was released on September 30, 2008. Two songs off the record, "Midnight in the City of Destruction" (about New Orleans and Hurricane Katrina) and "King of Hell" (written about the Guantanamo Bay detention camp), had previously been leaked on the Nightwatchman MySpace or performed during live sets. The album was released under the retooled moniker of Tom Morello: The Nightwatchman, which is how the project became known thereafter.

"The template is half Dylan and half Hendrix. It's going to be half acoustic and half electric. Not only will there be the no sell-out, acoustic, three chords and the truth part of the show, but also, with the band I put together called the Freedom Fighter Orchestra, there will be more insane electric playing than I've ever done with Rage or Audioslave because it's not confined to a three-and-a-half-minute song."

— Tom Morello

The Freedom Fighter Orchestra's original line-up included The Satellite Party's Carl Restivo on guitar, Gigolo Aunts' Dave Gibbs on bass, and actor Breckin Meyer on drums. To promote the new album, Morello and the band appeared both on The Late Late Show with Craig Ferguson and on Late Night with Conan O'Brien before heading out on The Fabled City Tour, an eighteen stop tour in the United States.

=== World Wide Rebel Songs and project retirement ===
To support the many unions affected by the anti-negotiation/bargaining laws due to the 2011 Wisconsin budget protests, Morello performed outside the Madison Capitol building on February 21, 2011, to rousing support. He also teamed up with fellow rock musician Wayne Kramer in support of the protesters performing the title song of his upcoming album, World Wide Rebel Songs. Kramer appears on said song on the album, performing backing vocals.

On the Nightwatchman website, it was announced that Morello had signed with the label New West Records to release his third album as the Nightwatchman, World Wide Rebel Songs, on August 30, 2011. Before the release of the album, Morello released an EP entitled Union Town on May 17, 2011. All proceeds of the EP sales will go to benefit The America Votes Labor Unity Fund. In October 2011 and on May Day 2012, Morello performed in support of the protesters at Occupy LA and Occupy Wall Street. He continued to perform runs of shows into 2013. Morello's final appearance under the moniker was at Summit Music Hall in Denver, Colorado on July 23, 2016. Thereafter, Morello retired the Nightwatchman project; since 2018, he has released solo music under his own name.

== The Freedom Fighter Orchestra ==
- Tom Morello – lead vocals, acoustic guitar (2008–2013)
- Carl Restivo – rhythm guitar, backing vocals (2008–2013)
- Dave Gibbs – bass, backing vocals (2008–2013)
- Eric Gardner – drums, backing vocals (2011–2013)

Former members

- Breckin Meyer – drums, percussion, backing vocals (2008–2011)

Additional members

- Flea – bass (2008, The Late Late Show with Craig Ferguson taping)
- Robbie Seahag Mangano – bass, backing vocals (filling in for David Gibbs on performances in 2011, 2012, 2024. Studio bass and guitar on "Blind Willie McTell")

== Discography ==
=== Studio albums ===
Title	Album details	Peak chart positions
Title	Album details	US
One Man Revolution	Released: April 24, 2007; Label: Epic Records; Formats: CD	119
The Fabled City	Released: September 30, 2008; Label: Epic Records; Formats: CD	180
Union Town	Released: May 17, 2011; Label: New West Records; Formats: CD	—
World Wide Rebel Songs	Released: August 30, 2011; Label: New West Records; Formats: CD	—
"—" denotes a release that did not chart or was not issued in that region.

=== Live album ===
Year	Title
2009	Live at Lime: Released: December 10, 2009; Label: None; Formats: MP3

=== Singles ===
Year	Album	Song	Artist(s)	Ref.
2007	One Man Revolution	"The Road I Must Travel"	"Tom Morello"	
2008	The Fabled City	"Whatever it Takes"	"Tom Morello"	
2016	Battle Sirens	"Battle Sirens"	"Tom Morello, Knife Party"	

=== Other appearances ===
Year	Album	Song(s)	Ref.
2004	Songs and Artists That Inspired Fahrenheit 9/11	"No One Left"	
2004	Tell Us the Truth: The Live Concert Recording	"California's Dark" "House Gone Up in Flames"	
2004	Axis of Justice: Concert Series Volume 1	"Until the End"	
2007	Body of War: Songs that Inspired an Iraq War Veteran	"Battle Hymns"	
2008	Sicko soundtrack	"Alone Without You"	
2011	Todos Somos Ilegales	"Deportees"	
2012	Chimes of Freedom: Songs of Bob Dylan Honoring 50 Years of Amnesty International	"Blind Willie McTell"	
