= Prophets of Rage (album) =

Studio album by Prophets of Rage
- Released: September 15, 2017
- Recorded: 2016–2017
- Studios: Henson Recording Studios, Los Angeles, California
- Genres: Rap rock; hard rock; funk rock; rap metal; protest music
- Length: 39:40
- Label: Fantasy
- Producer: Brendan O'Brien

Prophets of Rage chronology
The Party's Over (2016)	Prophets of Rage (2017)

Prophets of Rage is the only studio album by American rap rock supergroup Prophets of Rage, consisting of three members of Rage Against the Machine and Audioslave (bassist and backing vocalist Tim Commerford, guitarist Tom Morello, and drummer Brad Wilk), Public Enemy's DJ Lord and rapper Chuck D, and Cypress Hill rapper B-Real. The group formed in 2016 with a mission to "confront the injustices and be the soundtrack of resistance," and the primary message of Prophets of Rage is only the people themselves can solve the world's problems.

Released on September 15, 2017, by Fantasy Records, Prophets of Rage garnered very divided reviews, with favorable reviews praising the chemistry between the members of the supergroup and the harshness of the LP and critics that disliked the album panning the vague, one-dimensional lyrics. Commercially, however, the album debuted at number 16 on the American Billboard 200 chart, selling more than 21,000 copies in the United States in its first week of release, and also landed in the top 20 of charts of several European countries.

== Background ==
On April 12, 2016, CNN broadcast a story with the headline "Trump Rages Against the GOP Machine." Tom Morello said in a Channel 4 interview, "We said, "you may not have that territory that belongs to us."" This influenced him to form a supergroup with Rage Against the Machine members Brad Wilk and Tim Commerford, Public Enemy's Chuck D and DJ Lord, and Cypress Hill's B-Real to form the supergroup Prophets of Rage less than two months later. They formed the band to "confront the injustices and be the soundtrack of resistance."

In a June 2016 interview, Chuck D said that he was skeptical Prophets of Rage was going to make a full-length album: "I see us making no more than two or three songs at best that round us out because it has to come together organically and naturally." However, the group then went into a rehearsal area to start conceiving songs, using the "momentum" from their live performances, and "as we were doing that the creative flow was great, because everyone had great ideas and everyone was open to each others’ ideas," B-Real explained. The band was able to write ten songs in two weeks, and most of the demos were finished in only around three months.

The group then immediately got into the studio with producer and regular Rage Against the Machine collaborator Brendan O'Brien to record all of the songs. As B-Real explained, "All of us have tremendous respect for Brendan O’Brien, we thought we definitely had something. He is a guy who is honest, brutally honest if you will, and he would have told us if we were standing on shit." All of the songs were recorded in more than a month and placed together on an album titled Prophets of Rage.

== Concept and composition ==
"We’re not a supergroup. We’re an elite task force of revolutionary musicians determined to confront this mountain of election year bullshit, and confront it head-on with the Marshall stacks blazing."

— Chuck D in a Rolling Stone interview

As B-Real described Prophets of Rage:

What we tried to do was to make some rockin’ music, more than anything, and make our messages on it; things that are happening right now, relevant things that people are neglecting to talk about in their music – which is fine, everybody has their lane, and what they want to do, but we chose to be the voice of the people.

Prophets of Rage is the most equivalent to the works of Rage Against The Machine for its use of harsh guitar riffs and sloganeering, though it also contains the same funk rock rhythms as the works of Cypress Hill and Public Enemy. Andy Cush, a critic for Spin, wrote that most of the album follows exactly the same structure: "a hulking riff to start; a lightly funky rapped verse; a shout-along chorus, maybe with the intro riff again, maybe a slightly different one."

The main message of the group's music is that it's up to the people to fix the world's problems. On the album, it's most shown in the song "Unfuck The World," a statement to many individuals that "if you want to see this change, you got to get up and orchestrate that happening." As Chuck D sings on the track through a megaphone filter, "No hatred / Fuck racists / Blank faces / Time’s changin' / One nation / Unification / The vibration / Unfuck the world!" "Hail to the Chief" is about how Donald Trump's silly antics are used as distractions to keep people's focus away from Mike Pence's "deathly" plans. "Legalize Me" is about the legalization of marijuana, something B-Real usually advocated for.

== Promotion ==
On May 8, 2017, Prophets of Rage premiered "Unfuck the World" while performing in Chile. The track and its official music video were released on June 1, 2017. The video was directed by Michael Moore, who also directed the video for the 2000 Rage Against the Machine single "Sleep Now in the Fire," and is a collage of live performances of the group, Pepsi's "Live for Now" advertisement, and news footage of Donald Trump, police brutality, factory farming, nuclear bombs, poor neighborhoods, and celebrities. "Living On The 110" was issued as the album's second single on July 12, 2017 and was performed by the band on The Tonight Show Starring Jimmy Fallon on September 12, 2017. The song's video, released on July 21, 2017, depicts Prophets of Rage playing the song while statistics about poverty and wealth inequality in the United States occasionally appear. Near the video's end, it includes a sample of Nelson Mandela saying, "Overcoming poverty is not a gesture of charity. It is an act of justice. It is the protection of a fundamental human right. The right to dignity and a decent life. While poverty exists, there is no true freedom."

Prophets of Rage's third single, "Radical Eyes," was released on August 7, 2017, its video, a collection of footage of protests of events such as the 1960s civil rights movement and the Unite the Right rally in Charlottesville. On September 20, 2017, the music video for "Hail to the Chief" was released. Directed and produced by David C. Snyder and Carl Ryder, it depicts the White House as a Trump Tower with African-Americans hanging in the front lawn and Trump's head imposed onto a cowboy shooting Hillary Clinton and members of the Nazi party doing the salute. Mike Pence is in the visuals praising Trump's action, putting him "as the actual person controlling the nation while constantly lurking in the background," wrote Eddie Fu. "Strength in Numbers" was issued on September 5, 2017, its music video on October 16. The videos samples footage about and related to NFL players protesting by kneeling during the National Anthem. Prophets of Rage livestreamed the track "Legalize Me" on September 7, 2017. On November 2, 2017, the group wrote a post on Facebook asking fans to submit pictures and videos of themselves holding a sign saying "Legalize Me" while lip-syncing to the song's chorus for a music video of "Legalize Me." However, a music video for the song was never released.

== Release ==
Released worldwide on September 15 by Fantasy Records, Prophets of Rage debuted at number 16 on the United States Billboard 200 chart, selling over 21,000 copies in the nation in its first week. The album also peaked in the top-twenty of several European and Oceanic nations such as the United Kingdom (#6), France (#8), Germany (#14), New Zealand (#4), and Australia (#11).

== Critical reception ==
Professional ratings
Aggregate scores
Source	Rating
AnyDecentMusic?	5.3/10
Metacritic	54/100
Review scores
Source	Rating
The A.V. Club	D
Classic Rock	3.5/5 stars
Consequence of Sound	C−
Exclaim!	6/10
The Guardian	2/5 stars
Mojo	3/5 stars
NME	4/5 stars
Pitchfork	4.6/10
Q	2/5 stars
Rolling Stone	3/5 stars

Prophets of Rage was met with "mixed or average" reviews from critics. At Metacritic, which assigns a weighted average rating out of 100 to reviews from mainstream publications, this release received an average score of 54 based on 19 reviews. Its detractors mainly criticized the record's non-specific, unmoving one-dimensional political messages and bland musical style. Some reviewers even criticized the unoriginal statements of the album's promotional material, including its music videos, cover art, and merchandise. Some critics claimed the album had more of a focus on nostalgia for the groups the members derived from than its political themes. Clayton Purdom of The A.V. Club called Prophets of Rage "trainwreck bad—latter-day Limp Bizkit bad, "Magnets, how do they work" bad." Cush wrote that most of the album follows exactly the same structure but got "even worse" in the few moments where it goes out of that formula. Exclaim! found the lyrics to be all over the place from "walk[ing] a line between accessibility and on-the-nose-ness" to "ruinously bad."

Chuck D's performance was another common criticism, some opining he was more suited to 1990s hip-hop instrumentals than Rage Against the Machine's style of rock that's persistent on Prophets of Rage. Punknews.org's Ricky Frankel panned the use of auto-tune processing on B-Real's voice, and Pitchfork's Evan Rytlewski wrote that "he stick-and-moves with all the dexterity of the Kool-Aid Man." However, Rytlewski found the album to be better than the group's EP The Party's Over (2016), "which introduced a band seemingly less interested in justice than a quick buck. [On Prophets of Rage], there’s no questioning that their hearts are in it."

Some of Prophets of Rage's favorable reviews mainly enjoyed the album's furious tone, Jordan Bassett of NME writing, "This is not a subtle record, but these are not subtle times. So grab a Marshall stack, put it through a fascist’s window and let’s start the revolution. Now." Glenn Gamboa of Newsday highlighted how "each song has multiple layers that all make the song stronger, like fingers closing into a raised fist." Some writers praised the chemistry between the members of the band, especially the mixture of Chuck D's harsh baritone rapping and B-Real's bright snarly voice. However, Guy Oddy of The Arts Desk was disappointed with the lack of prominence of DJ Lord on the LP.

== Accolades ==
Accolades for Prophets of Rage
Publication	Accolade	Rank
Classic Rock	The 50 Best Albums of 2017	19
The Digital Fix	The Music Fix Albums of 2017	—N/a
Fopp	The Best in 2017	56
Kerrang!	Albums Of 2017	24

== Track listing ==
All tracks are written by Tom Morello, Tim Commerford, Brad Wilk, Carlton Ridenhour, and Louis Freese.

No.	Title	Length
1.	"Radical Eyes"	3:22
2.	"Unfuck the World"	4:10
3.	"Legalize Me"	3:35
4.	"Living on the 110"	3:48
5.	"The Counteroffensive"	0:37
6.	"Hail to the Chief"	4:08
7.	"Take Me Higher"	3:47
8.	"Strength in Numbers"	3:08
9.	"Fired a Shot"	3:28
10.	"Who Owns Who"	3:28
11.	"Hands Up"	2:39
12.	"Smashit"	3:25
Total length:		42:12

== Personnel ==
Prophets of Rage

- B-Real – vocals
- Chuck D – vocals
- Tim Commerford – bass guitar, backing vocals
- DJ Lord – turntables, backing vocals
- Tom Morello – guitar
- Brad Wilk – drums, percussion

Additional personnel

- Brendan O'Brien – producer, mixing
- Tom Syrowski – engineer
- Derrick Stockwell - assistant engineer
- Billy Joe Bowers – mastering
- Shepard Fairey – art
- Travis Shinn – cover photography
- Titan Miskevich – interior photography
- Carrie Smith – package design

== Charts ==
Chart performance for Prophets of Rage
Chart (2017)	Peak position
Australian Albums (ARIA)	11
Austrian Albums (Ö3 Austria)	12
Belgian Albums (Ultratop Flanders)	13
Belgian Albums (Ultratop Wallonia)	15
Canadian Albums (Billboard)	17
Czech Albums (ČNS IFPI)	58
Dutch Albums (Album Top 100)	36
French Albums (SNEP)	16
German Albums (Offizielle Top 100)	14
Irish Albums (IRMA)	16
Italian Albums (FIMI)	96
New Zealand Albums (RMNZ)	4
Polish Albums (ZPAV)	24
Scottish Albums (Official Charts)	5
Spanish Albums (PROMUSICAE)	30
Swiss Albums (Schweizer Hitparade)	3
UK Albums (Official Charts)	6
UK Rock & Metal Albums (Official Charts)	2
US Billboard 200	16
US Top Alternative Albums (Billboard)	4
US Top Rock Albums (Billboard)	4
