= One Man Revolution =

Studio album by The Nightwatchman
- Released: April 24, 2007
- Recorded: Buds Garage and Southern Tracks Recording; Atlanta, Georgia
- Genres: Folk rock, acoustic rock, anti-folk, protest music
- Label: Epic
- Producer: Brendan O'Brien

The Nightwatchman chronology
One Man Revolution (2007)	The Fabled City (2008)

Singles from One Man Revolution
- 1. "The Road I Must Travel" Released: 2007

Professional ratings
Aggregate scores
Source	Rating
Metacritic	66/100
Review scores
Source	Rating
AllMusic	3.5/5 stars
Alternative Press	3/5
Entertainment Weekly	B
Hot Press	6/10
MusicOMH	4/5 stars
NME	4/10
Rolling Stone	3.5/5 stars
The Skinny	4/5 stars

One Man Revolution is the 2007 debut album by The Nightwatchman, Tom Morello's acoustic alter ego. It was released on April 24, 2007.

== Track listing ==
All tracks are written by Tom Morello.

No.	Title	Length
1.	"California's Dark"	3:59
2.	"One Man Revolution"	3:24
3.	"Let Freedom Ring"	5:19
4.	"The Road I Must Travel"	3:50
5.	"The Garden of Gethsemane"	4:02
6.	"House Gone Up in Flames"	3:23
7.	"Flesh Shapes the Day"	3:43
8.	"Battle Hymns"	4:35
9.	"Maximum Firepower"	4:19
10.	"Union Song"	3:15
11.	"No One Left"	3:32
12.	"The Dark Clouds Above"	2:22
13.	"Until the End"	4:23
14.	"Alone Without You" (iTunes bonus track)	3:06
15.	"Branding Iron" (iTunes bonus track)	3:49

== Credits ==
- All songs performed by Tom Morello, with additional instruments by Brendan O'Brien
- Produced by Brendan O'Brien
- Recorded by Nick Didia at Buds Garage and Southern Tracks Recording, Atlanta, GA
- Assisted by Tom Tapley, and at Henson Recording Studio, Los Angeles, CA – assistant Tom Syrowski
