= Something Bitchin' This Way Comes =

Studio album by Lock Up
- Released: July 1989
- Recorded: 1988
- Studios: The Site, San Rafael, California; The Sound Factory, Hollywood, Los Angeles, California; Sound Image, Van Nuys, Los Angeles, California
- Genres: Heavy metal, funk metal, glam metal, hard rock
- Length: 47:02
- Label: Geffen
- Producer: Matt Wallace

Professional ratings
Review scores
Source	Rating
AllMusic	3/5 stars

Something Bitchin' This Way Comes is the sole album by Lock Up, released in 1989. It is the first label-released album to feature Tom Morello.

The album was re-released in 1997 by Manifesto Records.

== Track listing ==
1. "Can't Stop the Bleeding" (Lock Up) – 4:11
2. "Nothing New" (Grillo, Livingston) – 3:10
3. "Punch Drunk" (Lock Up) – 3:37
4. "Everywhere I Go It Looks Like Rain" (Grillo) – 4:14
5. "24 Hour Man" (Lock Up) – 4:46
6. "Don't Wanna Talk About It" (Lock Up) – 3:47
7. "Half Man, Half Beast" (Lock Up) – 3:45
8. "Tell Me When It's Over" (Lock Up) – 5:32
9. "Kiss 17 Goodbye" (Grillo, Livingston) – 4:14
10. "Where the Sky Meets the Street" (Lock Up) – 3:19
11. "Maniac" (Grillo, Morello) – 3:34
12. "Peacekeeper" (Lock Up) – 3:47

== Personnel ==
Lock Up

- Brian Grillo – lead and backing vocals, percussion, artwork
- Tom Morello – guitars, backing vocals
- Chris Beebe – bass, backing vocals
- Vince Ostertag – drums, backing vocals, percussion

Technical

- Matt Wallace – producer, engineer
- Robert Missbach, Glen Matisoff, Kevin Scott, Neal Avron, Susan Palyo, David Bryson, Victor Deyglio – engineers
- Michael Barbiero, Steve Thompson – mixing
- George Marino – mastering
- Kevin Reagan – art direction
- Willy Mrasek – cover photography
