= Prophets of Rage =

American rap rock band (2016–2019)

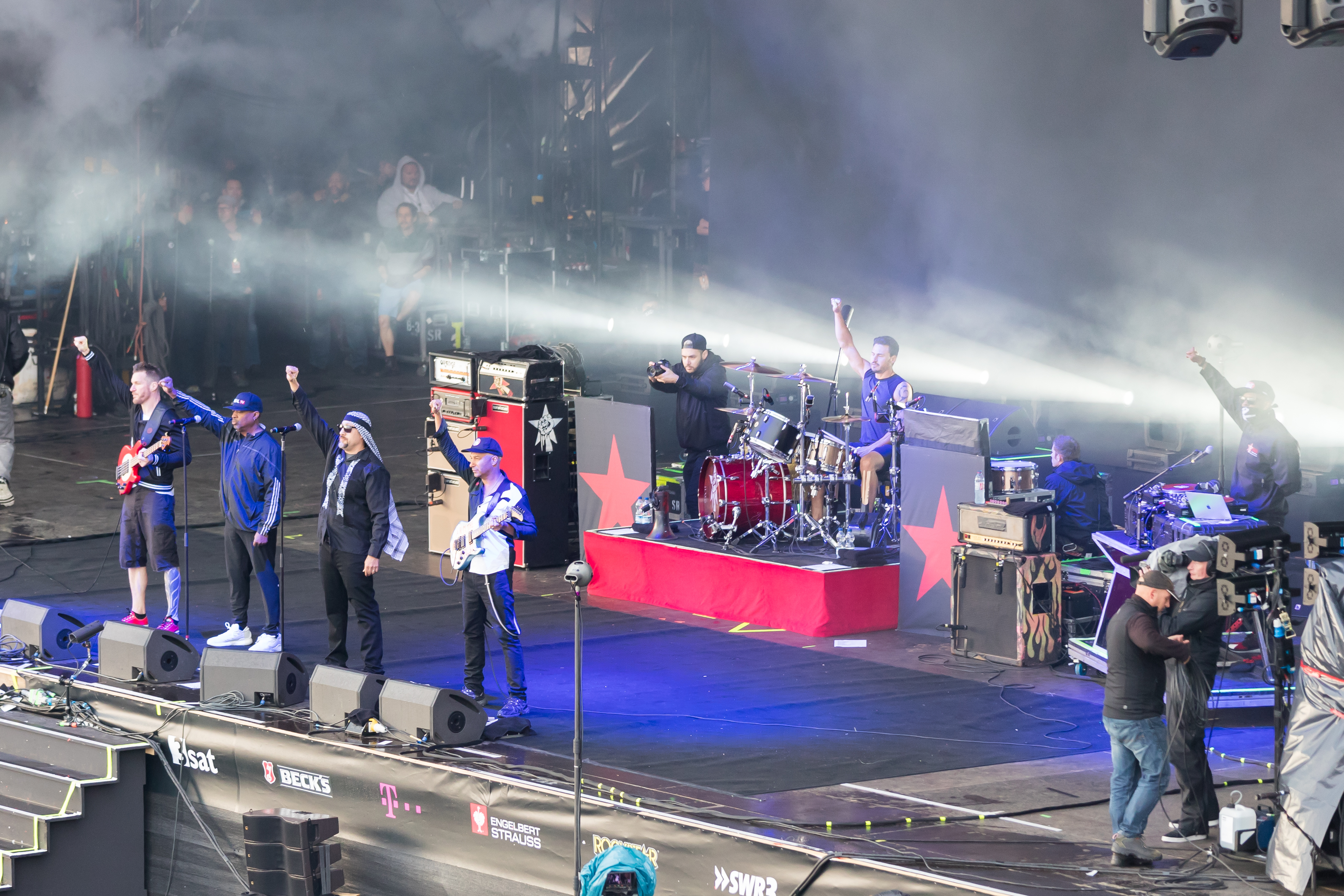
- Prophets of Rage in performing in Neuchâtel in 2017

Background information
- Origin: Los Angeles, California, U.S.
- Genres: Rap rock; rap metal
- Years active: 2016–2019
- Label: Fantasy
- Spinoff of: Rage Against the Machine; Audioslave; Public Enemy; Cypress Hill
- Past members: B-Real; Chuck D; Tom Morello; Tim Commerford; DJ Lord; Brad Wilk

Prophets of Rage was an American rap rock supergroup. Formed in 2016, the group consisted of three members of Rage Against the Machine and Audioslave (bassist and backing vocalist Tim Commerford, guitarist Tom Morello, and drummer Brad Wilk), two members of Public Enemy (DJ Lord and rapper Chuck D), and rapper B-Real of Cypress Hill. The band disbanded in 2019, following the reuniting of Rage Against the Machine. During its three-year existence, Prophets of Rage released one EP and one full-length studio album.

== History ==
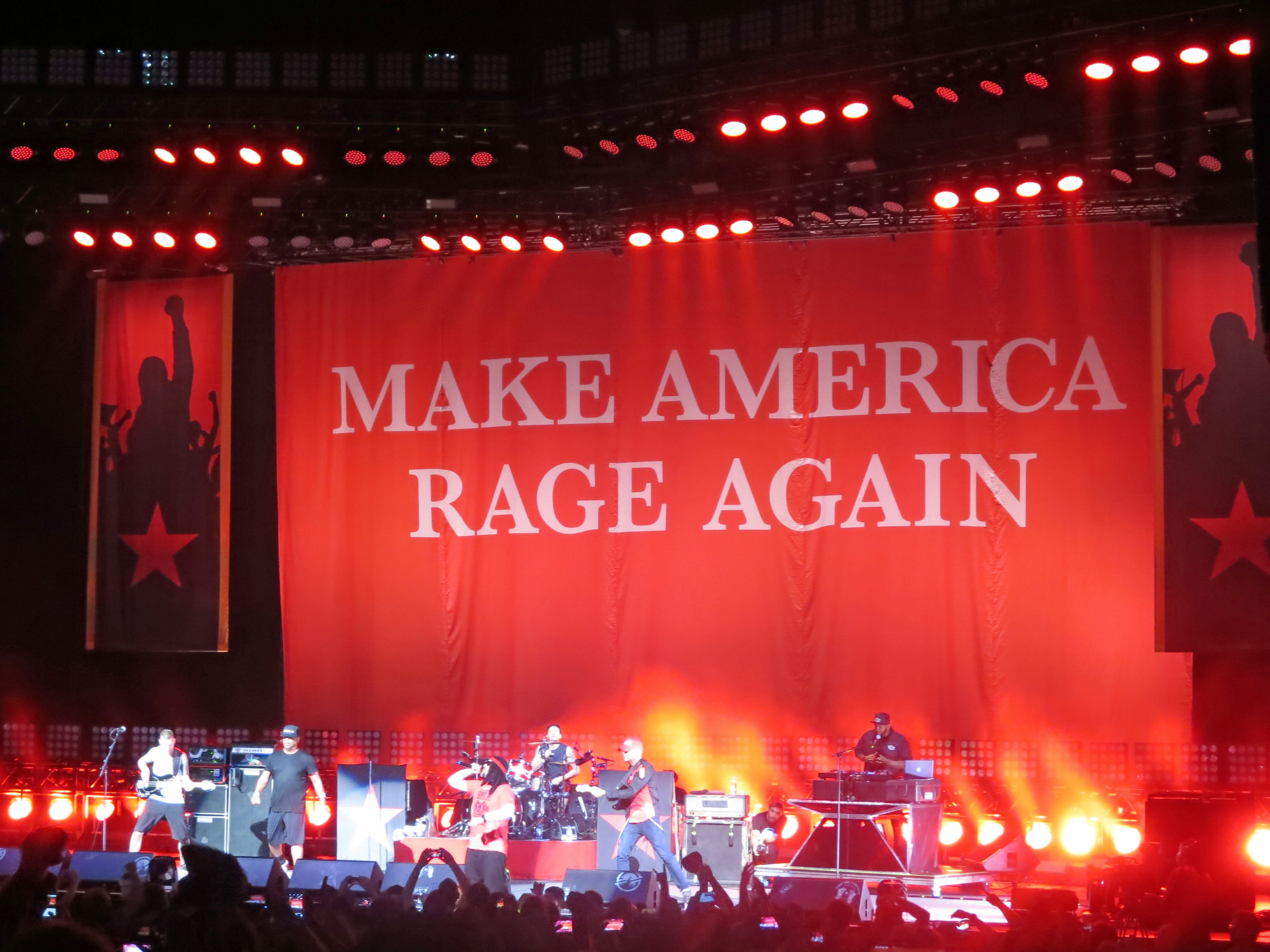
The band on tour, 2016

Morello declared to Rolling Stone: "We're an elite task force of revolutionary musicians determined to confront this mountain of election year bullshit, and confront it head-on with Marshall stacks blazing."

The band's name derives from the title of the Public Enemy song "Prophets of Rage" from its 1988 album It Takes a Nation of Millions to Hold Us Back. To coincide with the band's protest performance at the Republican National Convention, it released its debut single, titled "Prophets of Rage". The band played its first live show on January 20, 2016.

From May 2016 through October 2016, the band embarked on a North American tour, dubbed the "Make America Rage Again Tour". The set list combined the catalogues of each of the band members' current and former groups, as well as new material written by the band.

An EP The Party's Over was released on August 19, 2016. Alongside the songs Prophets of Rage and The Party's Over, the EP contains live cover versions of the songs "Killing in the Name" (Rage Against the Machine), "Shut 'Em Down" (Public Enemy) and "No Sleep 'til Cleveland", a rework of "No Sleep 'til Brooklyn" by the Beastie Boys. The EP was produced by Brendan O'Brien.

On June 1, 2017, the band released a single with accompanying music video for the track "Unfuck the World" from their album Prophets of Rage. The band released the singles "Living on the 110" on July 11 and "Radical Eyes" on July 22. The self-titled album, featuring all original material, was released on September 15 by Fantasy Records.

The band was announced as the opening act on Avenged Sevenfold's 2018 End of the World summer tour in the US. Due to M. Shadows becoming ill with a viral infection that rendered him voiceless, the "End of the World" tour was ultimately cancelled before it could begin. On July 6, 2018, the band released the single "Heart Afire", their first new music since the debut album. The band followed up that offering with "Made With Hate", released as a single on June 24, 2019.. The band was working on a second record, but it was never released, presumably due to the Rage Against the Machine reunion that ensued.

With the 2020 reunion of Rage Against the Machine confirmed on November 1, 2019, B-Real and Chuck D announced that Prophets of Rage were no more, stating that they were merely "keeping the seat warm" for Zack de la Rocha.

== Members ==
- B-Real – vocals
- Chuck D – vocals
- Tom Morello – guitars
- Tim Commerford – bass guitar, backing vocals
- DJ Lord – turntables, backing vocals
- Brad Wilk – drums, percussion

== Discography ==
=== Studio albums ===
- Prophets of Rage (2017, Fantasy Records)

=== Extended plays ===
- The Party's Over (2016)

=== Singles ===
Title	Year	Peak chart positions				Album
Title	Year	US Main.	US Alt.	US Rock	Rock Airplay	Album
"Prophets of Rage"	2016	4	35	30	21	The Party's Over (EP)
"Unfuck the World"	2017	—	—	—	—	Prophets of Rage
"Living on the 110"	2017	16	—	50	41	Prophets of Rage
"Radical Eyes"	2017	—	—	—	—	Prophets of Rage
"Heart Afire"	2018	—	—	—	—	—
"Made with Hate"	2019	—	—	—	—	—
"Pop Goes the Weapon"	2019	—	—	—	—	—
"—" denotes a release that did not chart.
