= The Fabled City =

Studio album by The Nightwatchman
- Released: September 30, 2008
- Recorded: 2008
- Genres: Folk rock, acoustic rock, anti-folk, protest music
- Label: Epic
- Producer: Brendan O'Brien

The Nightwatchman chronology
One Man Revolution (2007)	The Fabled City (2008)	Live at Lime (2009)

The Fabled City is the second studio album by The Nightwatchman, the alter ego of Tom Morello. It was released on September 30, 2008.

The album was released under the Nightwatchman's new full title: Tom Morello: The Nightwatchman.

Serj Tankian (of System of a Down), Shooter Jennings, and Perry Farrell (of Jane's Addiction) are featured guests on the album, which was produced by Brendan O'Brien (Pearl Jam, Rage Against the Machine, Audioslave).

On August 8, 2008, the track 'Whatever It Takes' was released on The Nightwatchman's MySpace. On October 25, the bonus track "Shake My Shit" (featuring Perry Farrell) was released on Morello's Myspace page.

== Critical reception ==
Professional ratings
Aggregate scores
Source	Rating
Metacritic	61/100
Review scores
Source	Rating
AllMusic	4/5 stars
Blender	2.5/5 stars
Drowned in Sound	2/10
Entertainment Weekly	A−
Los Angeles Times	3/4 stars
MSN Music (Consumer Guide)	(dud)
PopMatters	3/10
Rolling Stone	3/5 stars
Spin	2.5/5 stars
Under the Radar	7/10

Media reception to The Fabled City was generally favorable; aggregating website Metacritic reported a rating of 61% in December 2009 based on 11 critical reviews.

== Track listing ==
All tracks are written by Tom Morello, except where noted.

No.	Title	Writer(s)	Length
1.	"The Fabled City"		3:10
2.	"Whatever It Takes"	Morello; Anne Preven	4:11
3.	"The King of Hell"		3:14
4.	"Night Falls"		3:48
5.	"The Lights Are On in Spidertown"		3:21
6.	"Midnight in the City of Destruction"		4:53
7.	"Saint Isabelle"		3:31
8.	"Lazarus On Down" (featuring Serj Tankian)		3:34
9.	"Gone Like Rain"		3:39
10.	"The Iron Wheel" (featuring Shooter Jennings)		2:40
11.	"Rise to Power"		3:57
12.	"Facing Mount Kenya" (iTunes Bonus Track)		4:08
13.	"Shake My Shit" (featuring Perry Farrell) (iTunes Bonus Track)		3:46

== Bonus Disc Track listing ==
No.	Title	Length
1.	"Shadow of the Cannon"	3:17
2.	"Fighting Song" (written by Outernational; performed by Outernational and Tom Morello)	3:39
3.	"Stars of Orion"	2:41

== Personnel ==
- The Nightwatchman (Tom Morello) - guitars, vocals
- Serj Tankian - additional vocals on "Lazarus on Down"
- Shooter Jennings - additional vocals on "The Iron Wheel"
- Perry Farrell - additional vocals on "Shake My Shit"
- Daniel Laufer - cello on "Night Falls" and "Lazarus on Down"
- Brendan O'Brien - various instruments
