= Tom Morello =

American guitarist and singer-songwriter (born 1964)

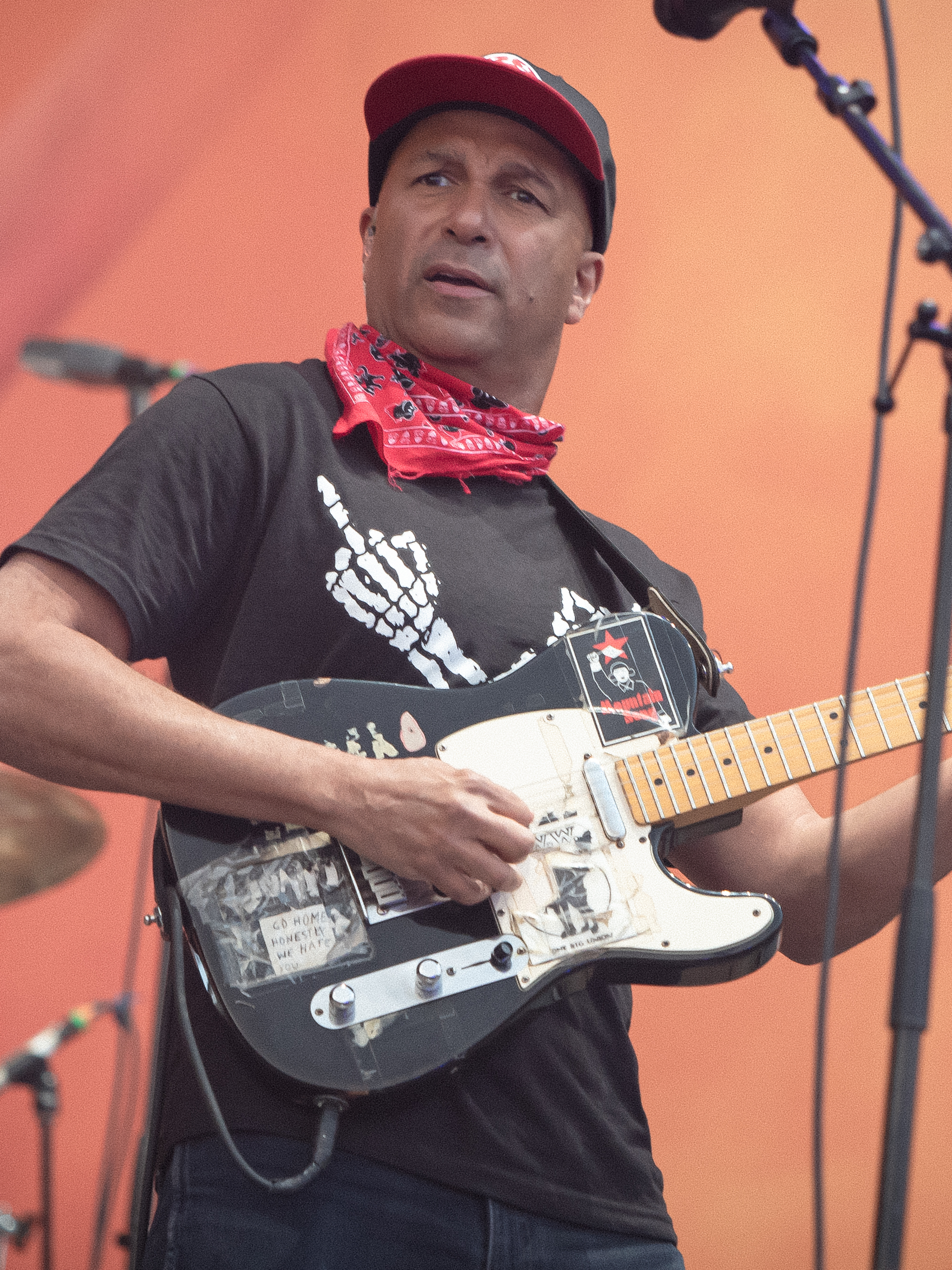
- Morello performing in Grenchen in 2024

Background information
- Also known as: The Nightwatchman
- Born: Thomas Baptist Morello; May 30, 1964 (age 62); Harlem, New York City, U.S.
- Origin: Libertyville, Illinois, U.S.
- Education: Harvard University (AB)
- Genres: Alternative metal; funk metal; rap metal; nu metal; hardcore punk; crossover; folk; EDM
- Occupations: Musician; singer; songwriter; political activist
- Instruments: Guitar; vocals
- Years active: 1979–present
- Labels: Sony BMG; Epic; Interscope
- Formerly of: Rage Against the Machine; Audioslave; Lock Up; The Nightwatchman; Prophets of Rage; Class of '99; Street Sweeper Social Club; Axis of Justice; Bored of Education; Joey Thunder and the Electrical Storm; The Deviates; The Zoo

Thomas Baptist Morello (born May 30, 1964) is an American guitarist, singer, songwriter, and political activist. He is known for his tenure with the rock bands Rage Against the Machine and Audioslave. Between 2016 and 2019, Morello was a member of the supergroup Prophets of Rage. Morello's other work includes several solo albums under his own name and the moniker the Nightwatchman, as well as work with the band Street Sweeper Social Club, which he formed with Boots Riley in 2006. Morello is also an occasional touring musician with Bruce Springsteen and the E Street Band. Morello co-founded Axis of Justice, which airs a monthly program on Pacifica Radio station KPFK (90.7 FM) in Los Angeles.

Born in Harlem, New York City and raised in Libertyville, Illinois, Morello became interested in music and politics while in high school. He attended Harvard University and earned a Bachelor of Arts degree from the Committee on Degrees in Social Studies. After his previous band Lock Up disbanded, Morello met Zack de la Rocha. The two founded Rage Against the Machine, going on to become one of the most popular and influential metal acts of the 1990s.

He is best known for his unique and creative guitar playing style, which incorporates feedback noise, unconventional picking and tapping as well as heavy use of guitar effects. Morello is also known for his socialist political views and activism, creating the solo project The Nightwatchman as an outlet for those views while playing apolitical music with Audioslave. He was ranked number 18 in Rolling Stone magazine's list of greatest guitarists of all time. As a member of Rage Against the Machine, he was inducted into the Rock and Roll Hall of Fame in 2023.

== Early life ==
Thomas Baptist Morello was born on May 30, 1964, in Harlem, New York City to parents Ngethe Njoroge and Mary Morello. Morello, an only child, is the son of an American mother of Italian and Irish descent and a Kenyan Kikuyu father. His mother was a schoolteacher from Marseilles, Illinois, who earned a Master of Arts at Loyola University, Chicago and traveled to Germany, Spain, Japan, and Kenya as an English language teacher between 1977 and 1983.

Morello's father participated in the Mau Mau Uprising (1952–1960) and was Kenya's first ambassador to the United Nations. Morello's paternal great-uncle, Jomo Kenyatta, was the first elected president of Kenya. His aunt, Jemimah Gecaga, was the first woman to serve in the legislature of Kenya and his uncle Njoroge Mungai was a Kenyan Cabinet Minister, Member of Parliament and was considered one of the founding fathers of modern Kenya. Morello's parents met in August 1963 while attending a pro-democracy protest in Nairobi, Kenya. After discovering her pregnancy, Mary Morello returned to the United States with Njoroge in November and they married in New York City.

Denying paternity of his son, Njoroge returned to his native Kenya when Morello was 16 months old. Morello was raised by his mother in Libertyville, Illinois and attended Libertyville High School, where his mother taught American history.

Morello developed left-leaning political proclivities early, following in his mother's footsteps. He described himself as having been "the only anarchist in a conservative high school" and has since identified as a nonsectarian socialist. In the 1980 mock elections at Libertyville, he campaigned for a fictitious anarchist "candidate" named Hubie Maxwell, who came in fourth place in the election. He wrote a piece headlined "South Africa: Racist Fascism That We Support" for the school alternative newspaper, The Student Pulse.

Morello graduated from high school with honors in June 1982 and enrolled at Harvard University as a political science student that autumn and lived in Currier House. His band Bored of Education won the Ivy League Battle of the Bands in 1986 with Carolyn Bertozzi, a laureate of the 2022 Nobel Prize in Chemistry, on keyboards. Morello graduated in 1986 with a Bachelor of Arts degree in social studies. He moved to Los Angeles, where he supported himself, first by working as an exotic dancer:

When I graduated from Harvard and moved to Hollywood, I was unemployable. I was literally starving so I had to work menial labor and, at one point, I even worked as an exotic dancer. 'Brick House' (by the Commodores) was my jam! I did bachelorette parties and I'd go down to my boxer shorts. Would I go further? All I can say is thank God it was in the time before YouTube! You could make decent money doing that job – people do what they have to do.

Adam Jones, a high school classmate, moved to Los Angeles as well; Morello introduced Jones and Maynard James Keenan to Danny Carey, who would form the band Tool.

From 1987 to 1988, Morello worked in the office of U.S. Senator Alan Cranston (D-CA); however, this proved to be a negative experience for Morello, who decided to never pursue a career in politics:

I never had any real desire to work in politics but if there was any ember burning in me, it was extinguished working in that job because of two things: one of them was the fact that 80 percent of the time I spent with the Senator, he was on the phone asking rich people for money. It just made me understand that the whole business was dirty. He had to compromise his entire being every day. The other was the time a woman phoned up to the office and wanted to complain that there were Mexicans moving into her neighborhood. I said to her, 'Ma'am, you're a damn racist' and she was indignant. I thought I was representing our cause well but I got yelled at for a week by everyone for saying that! I thought to myself that if I'm in a job where I can't call a damn racist a damn racist then it's not for me.

== Musical influences ==
At age 13, Morello joined his first band, a cover band called Nebula, as the lead singer. Nebula covered material by bands including Led Zeppelin, Steve Miller Band and Bachman–Turner Overdrive. In this same year, Morello purchased his first guitar. Around 1982, he started studying the guitar seriously. He had formed a band the same year called the Electric Sheep, featuring future Tool guitarist Adam Jones on bass. Morello wrote original material for the band that included politically-charged lyrics. Tom has cited Randy Rhoads as an influence when giving a speech at Randy's Rock and Roll Hall of Fame induction, stating that he had a poster of the guitarist on his wall, he also told Rolling Stone that the late Eddie Van Halen shaped his guitar style, calling him "Our generation's Mozart". Morello has said that he was profoundly influenced by Run-D.M.C and Jam Master Jay in particular.

At the time, Morello's musical tastes lay in the direction of hard rock and heavy metal, particularly Kiss and Iron Maiden. As he stated in Flight 666, he is a huge fan of Piece of Mind, Alice Cooper, Led Zeppelin, Rush and Black Sabbath. In an interview with MTV he said Black Sabbath "set the standard for all heavy bands to come". He cited Black Sabbath guitarist Tony Iommi as one of his biggest influences as a riff writer. Morello developed his own unique sound through the electric guitar. Later, his musical style and politics were greatly influenced by punk rock bands like the Clash, Sex Pistols, and Devo, and artists such as Bruce Springsteen and Bob Dylan. On Queen he said, "It's one of the few bands in the history of rock music that was actually best in a stadium. And I miss Freddie Mercury very much."

== Recording career ==
=== Lock Up (1987–1990) ===
In the mid 1980s, Morello joined the band Lock Up, for which he played guitar. The band's debut album, Something Bitchin' This Way Comes, was issued by major label Geffen Records in 1989. Lock Up had disbanded prior to Morello forming Rage Against the Machine.

=== Rage Against the Machine (1991–2000; 2007–2011, 2019–2024) ===
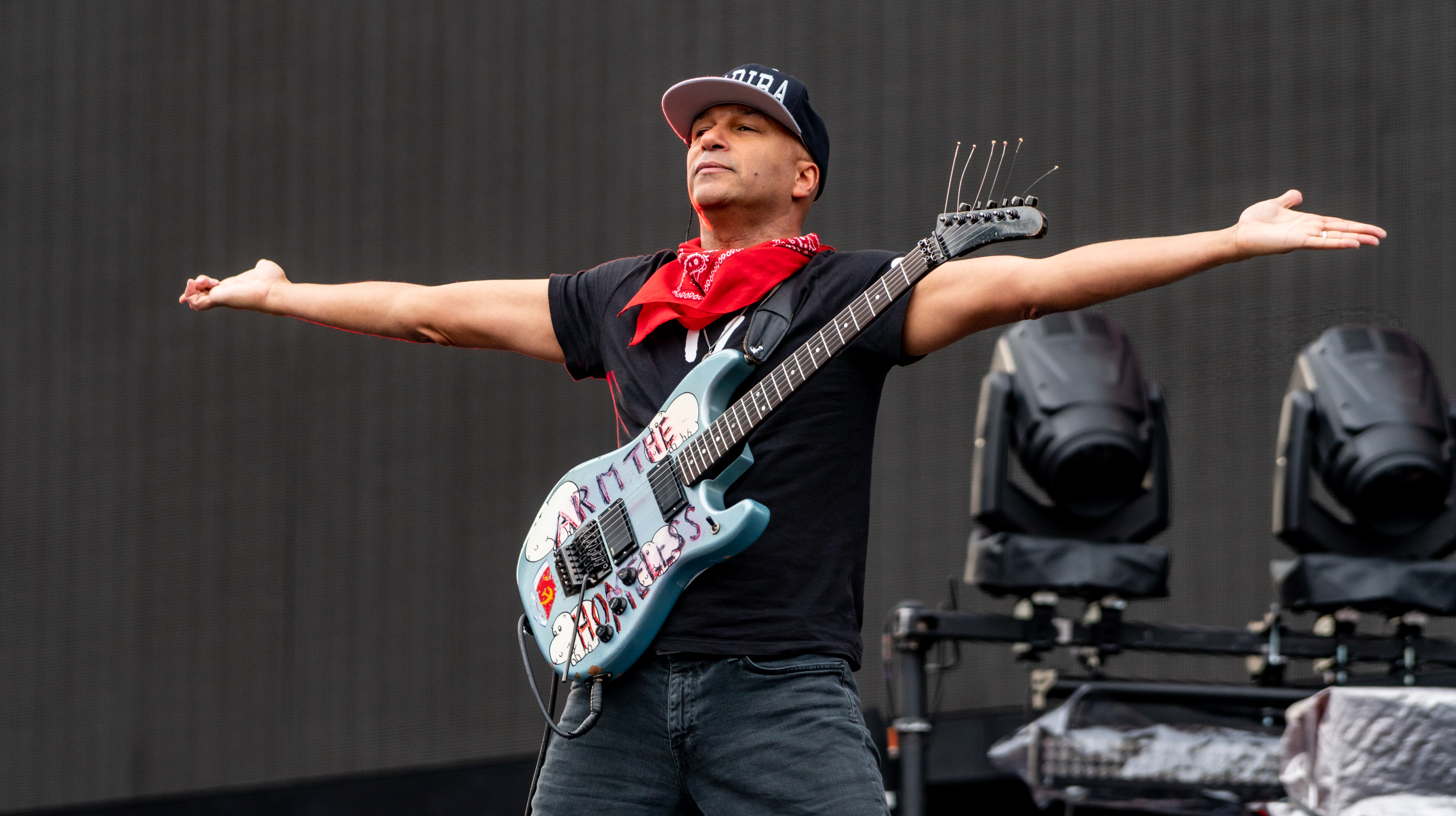
Morello playing in Bristol in 2019

In 1991, Morello was looking to form a new band after Lock Up disbanded. Morello was impressed by Zack de la Rocha's freestyle rapping and asked him to join his band. He drafted drummer Brad Wilk, whom he knew from Lock Up, for whom Wilk unsuccessfully auditioned for a drumming spot. The band's lineup was completed when de la Rocha convinced his childhood friend Tim Commerford to play bass. After frequenting the Los Angeles club circuit, Rage Against the Machine signed a record deal with Epic Records in 1992. That same year, the band released their self-titled debut album. They achieved mainstream success and released three more studio albums: Evil Empire in 1996, The Battle of Los Angeles in 1999, and Renegades in 2000.

In August 2000, in Los Angeles during the Democratic National Convention, Rage Against the Machine performed outside the Staples Center to a crowd numbering in the thousands while the convention took place inside. After several audience members began to throw rocks, the Los Angeles Police Department turned off the power and ordered the audience to disperse, firing rubber bullets and pepper spray into the crowd.

In late 2000, amid disagreements on the band's direction and Commerford's stunt at the VMAs, the disgruntled de la Rocha quit the band. On September 13, 2000, Rage Against the Machine performed their last concert, at the Grand Olympic Auditorium in Los Angeles. Although Rage Against the Machine disbanded in October 2000, their fourth studio album, Renegades, was released two months later. 2003 saw the release of their last album, titled Live at the Grand Olympic Auditorium, an edited recording of the band's final two concerts on September 12 and 13, 2000 at the Grand Olympic Auditorium in Los Angeles. It was accompanied by an expanded DVD release of the last show and included a previously unreleased music video for "Bombtrack".

After disbanding, Morello, Wilk, and Commerford went on to form Audioslave with then-former Soundgarden singer Chris Cornell and released three albums and a DVD from the band's concert in Cuba. De la Rocha started working on a solo album collaboration with DJ Shadow, Company Flow, and the Roots' Questlove, but the project was dropped in favor of working with Nine Inch Nails' Trent Reznor. Recording was completed, but the album will probably never be released. So far, only two tracks have been released: "We Want It All" was featured on "Songs and Artists that Inspired Fahrenheit 9/11", and "Digging For Windows" was released as a single.

==== Reunions ====
On April 29, 2007, Rage Against the Machine reunited at the Coachella Music Festival. The band played in front of an EZLN backdrop to the largest crowds of the festival. The performance was initially thought to be a one-off, but the band played seven more shows in 2007 and in January 2008 played their first shows outside the US since re-forming, as part of the Big Day Out Festival in Australia and New Zealand. In August 2008 they headlined nights at the Reading and Leeds festivals.

The band continued to tour around the world, headlining many large festivals in Europe and the United States, including Lollapalooza in Chicago. In 2008 the band also played shows in Denver, Colorado, and Minneapolis, Minnesota, to coincide with the Democratic National Convention and Republican National Convention, respectively. In July 2011, Rage Against the Machine played at L.A. Rising, a concert formed by the band in Los Angeles, in which they headlined and played with other artists, including Muse and Rise Against.

On November 1, 2019, it was reported that Rage Against the Machine were reuniting for their first shows in nine years in spring 2020, including two appearances at that year's Coachella Valley Music and Arts Festival. The planned summer 2020 tour was postponed due to the COVID-19 pandemic. The rescheduled tour began in July 2022, but remaining tour dates in North America and Europe needed to be postponed after De la Rocha tore his left Achilles' tendon. In 2024, Wilk announced that the band would no longer be touring or performing live.

=== Audioslave (2001–2007, 2017) ===
After de la Rocha left Rage Against the Machine, the remaining bandmates began collaborating with former Soundgarden vocalist Chris Cornell at the suggestion of producer Rick Rubin. The new group was first rumored to be called the Civilian Project, but the name Audioslave was confirmed before their first album was released.

The band released their eponymous debut album on November 19, 2002. It was a critical and commercial success, attaining triple-platinum status.

The band released their second album, Out of Exile, on May 24, 2005. It debuted at number 1 on the Billboard charts and attained platinum status. In the same year, they released a DVD documenting their trip as the first American rock band to play a free show in Cuba. The band's third album, Revelations, was released in the fall of 2006. As of February 15, 2007, Audioslave had broken up as a result of frontman Cornell's departure due to "irresolvable personality conflicts". The band reunited with Zack de la Rocha and resumed their previous band, Rage Against the Machine.

Audioslave reunited for one show in January 2017, and there were talks about a reunion tour. However, Cornell's death on May 18, 2017, eliminated such possibility.

=== The Nightwatchman (2003–present) ===
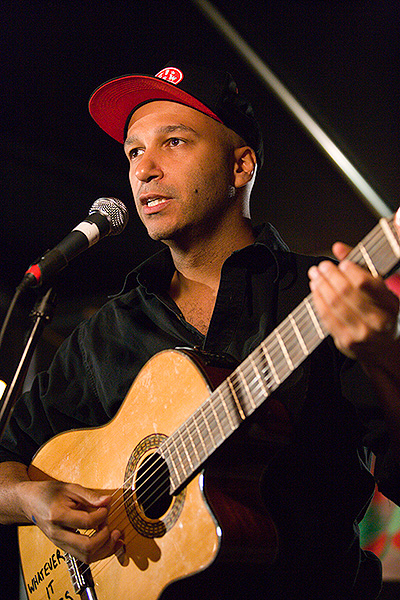
Morello performing as The Nightwatchman in May 2006

Morello writes and performs folk music under the alias the Nightwatchman.

In November 2003 the Nightwatchman joined artists Billy Bragg, Lester Chambers of the Chambers Brothers, Steve Earle, Jill Sobule, Boots Riley of the Coup and Mike Mills of R.E.M. on the Tell Us the Truth Tour. The thirteen-city tour was supported by unions, environmental and media reform groups including Common Cause, Free Press and A.F.L.-C.I.O. with the ultimate goal of "informing music fans, and exposing and challenging the failures of the major media outlets in the United States." Morello explained:

Media consolidation needs smashing and globalization needs unmasking. When presidents and politicians lie, it is the job of the press to expose those lies. When the press fails, the gangstas come out from hiding. The lie becomes the law. The point of the Tell Us the Truth Tour is to help others make connections, and to show them that activism can change the policies of this country.

One of his many songs, "No One Left", which compares the aftermath of September 11, 2001 attacks to that of a U.S. attack on Iraq, appears on the album Songs and Artists that Inspired Fahrenheit 9/11. The Nightwatchman appeared on the album/DVD Axis Of Justice: Concert Series Volume 1, contributing the songs "Until the End", "The Road I Must Travel", and "Union Song". Morello, as the Nightwatchman, released his debut solo album, One Man Revolution, on April 24, 2007. The Nightwatchman joined the Dave Matthews Band for its European tour in May 2007. As well as opening for the Dave Matthews Band, he was invited to guest on a couple of songs each night. The last night of this Morello/Dave Matthews Band arrangement was May 30, 2007, at Wembley Arena in London, on Morello's birthday. The Nightwatchman supported Ben Harper on tour. During this tour, Morello joined Harper onstage for a cover of Bob Dylan's "Masters of War", on which he plays the electric guitar in the style for which he is best known.

Morello has presided over a Hotel Café residency in Los Angeles since November 2007, which has featured many of his musical cohorts, including Serj Tankian, Perry Farrell, Jon Foreman of Switchfoot, Shooter Jennings, Nuno Bettencourt, Sen Dog of Cypress Hill, Jill Sobule, Boots Riley, Alexi Murdoch, Wayne Kramer of MC5 and others. On October 10, 2008, the Nightwatchman appeared on The Late Late Show with Craig Ferguson as a musical guest, promoting his new album The Fabled City. On December 17, 2011, Morello performed a live set for "Guitar Center Sessions" on DirecTV. The episode included an interview with program host Nic Harcourt. Morello, as the Nightwatchman, contributed a version of "Blind Willie McTell" on the Chimes Of Freedom: The Songs of Bob Dylan Honoring 50 Years of Amnesty International tribute album released in 2012.

On February 2, 2019, Morello made a guest appearance at the Foo Fighters pre-Super Bowl 53 concert in Atlanta, along with Zac Brown, for a cover of Black Sabbath's "War Pigs".

=== Street Sweeper Social Club (2006–present) ===
Following Audioslave's breakup in 2007, Morello met up with Boots Riley of the Coup, suggesting that they start a band which Morello had named Street Sweeper. The two created the duo Street Sweeper Social Club.

=== Bruce Springsteen and the E Street Band (2008–2015, 2026) ===
In April 2008, Morello made two guest appearances with Bruce Springsteen and the E Street Band at the Honda Center in Anaheim.

Morello appears on two songs on Springsteen's 2012 album Wrecking Ball. He joined Springsteen, the E Street Band, and the Roots on Late Night with Jimmy Fallon to preview the album prior to its release. On December 4, 2012, Morello again joined Springsteen and the E Street Band for five songs during a concert in Anaheim. On January 17, 2013, it was announced that Morello would temporarily join Springsteen and the E Street Band on the March 2013 Australian leg of their Wrecking Ball Tour, filling in for longtime E Street Band guitarist Steve Van Zandt, who had scheduling conflicts filming the TV series Lilyhammer. During the tour, Morello joined the band in the studio to record new music.

The material Morello recorded with Springsteen appeared on Springsteen's 18th studio album, High Hopes, which was released in January 2014. Morello appears on eight of the album's 11 tracks and shares lead vocals with Springsteen on a re-recording of "The Ghost of Tom Joad". It was Morello who originally suggested that Springsteen perform "High Hopes" during a concert for the first time in March 2013. Springsteen had previously recorded "High Hopes" in 1995, and the 2013 performance led to its re-recording, which subsequently developed into the album of the same name. Springsteen heavily credits Morello as being a major inspiration for the album by saying he was "my muse" and "he pushed the rest of this project to another level". Morello subsequently appeared alongside Springsteen and the E Street Band during a January 2014 appearance on Late Night with Jimmy Fallon and then on the ensuing High Hopes Tour which came to an end in May 2014.

Morello joined Springsteen and the E Street Band as a special guest on selected songs for their twenty date Land of Hope and Dreams American Tour, which began in March 2026 and concluded in May 2026.

=== Prophets of Rage (2016–2019) ===
Prophets of Rage formed in 2016. The supergroup consists of Morello, Rage Against the Machine's bassist and backing vocalist Tim Commerford, and drummer Brad Wilk, with Public Enemy's Chuck D and DJ Lord and Cypress Hill's B-Real. Morello declared to Rolling Stone: "We're an elite task force of revolutionary musicians determined to confront this mountain of election year bullshit, and confront it head-on with Marshall stacks blazing."

The band's name derives from the title of the Public Enemy song "Prophets of Rage" from their 1988 album It Takes a Nation of Millions to Hold Us Back. To coincide with their protest performance at the Republican National Convention, the band released their debut single, entitled "Prophets of Rage". The group released the EP, "The Party's Over" in 2016, and the LP "Prophets of Rage" in 2017. The band began their "Make America Rage Again" tour of North America during the summer of 2016 and continued to tour through 2018. With the announcement of the 2020 reunion of Rage Against the Machine, Prophets of Rage disbanded.

=== Solo albums (2018–present) ===
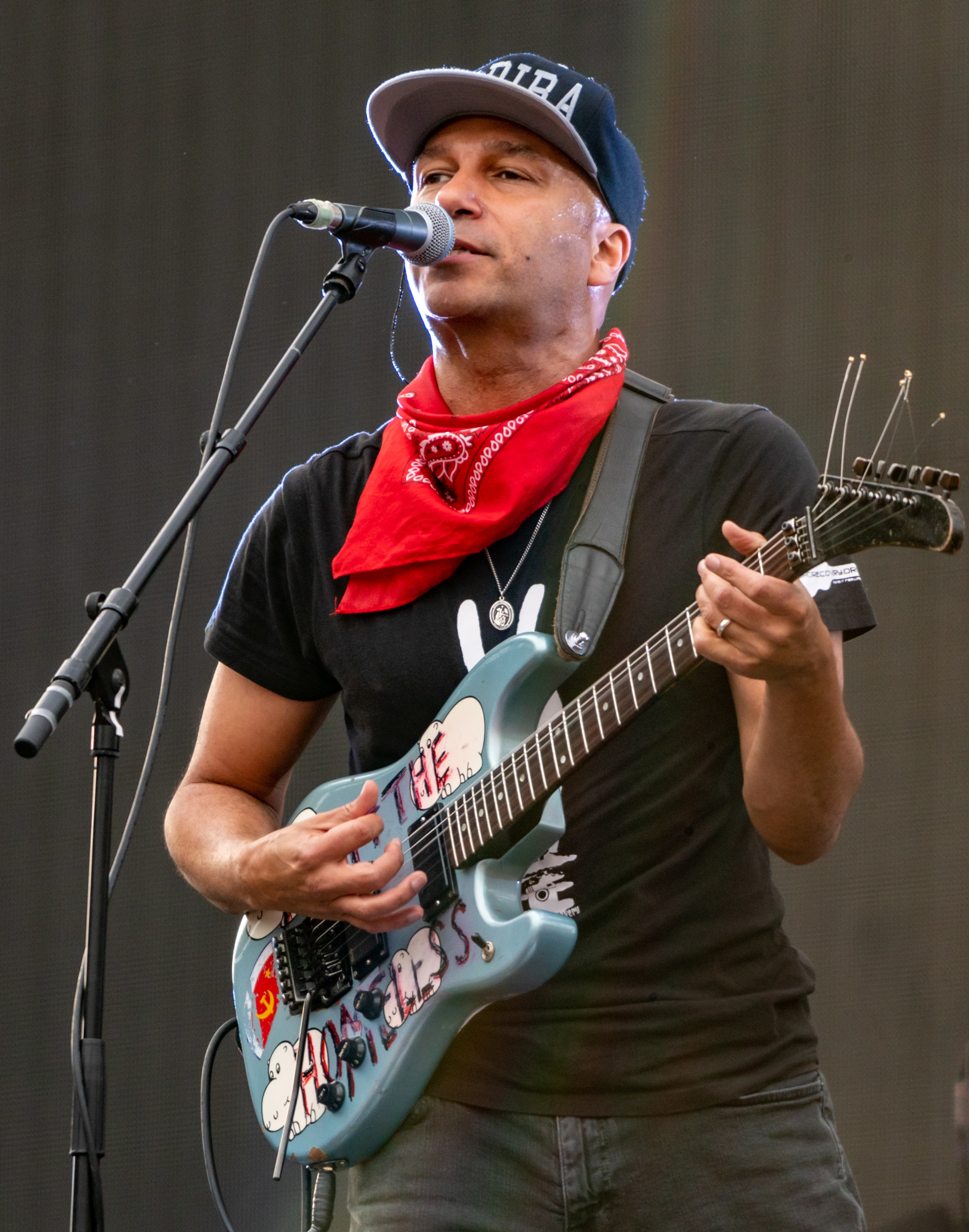
Morello performing in 2019

On July 26, Morello announced a new solo album titled The Atlas Underground featuring collaborations with Marcus Mumford, Portugal. The Man, Bassnectar, the Wu-Tang Clan's RZA and GZA, Vic Mensa, K.Flay, Big Boi, Gary Clark Jr., Pretty Lights, Killer Mike, Tim McIlrath, Steve Aoki and Whethan. The first songs released from the album are "We Don't Need You" featuring Vic Mensa and "Battle Sirens" featuring Knife Party. The Atlas Underground was released on October 12, 2018.

On September 21, 2021, Morello released a new song called "Let's Get The Party Started" featuring members of Bring Me the Horizon. He followed this with the October 15, 2021, release of his second solo album, The Atlas Underground Fire.

He released The Atlas Underground Flood in 2021.

In July 2026, he released "Date Night" as a single for his album Everyone Gets Everything They Want, which was released on September 25, 2026. The album features Roman Morello, Serj Tankian, Kneecap, and Beartooth.

=== Other side projects (1992–present) ===
In 1992, Morello collaborated with hip-hop group Run-DMC on the song "Big Willie", which later appeared on their 1993 album, Down with the King. Morello and Rage Against the Machine bandmate Brad Wilk joined with Maynard James Keenan of Tool and Billy Gould of Faith No More to record the song "Calling Dr. Love" for the 1994 Kiss tribute album Kiss My Ass: Classic Kiss Regrooved. The lineup was billed as Shandi's Addiction. Morello played lead guitar and produced on three tracks of Primus' 1999 studio album Antipop. Morello played the guitar on The Faculty soundtrack, featured with Class of '99 for their cover of Pink Floyd's "Another Brick in the Wall (pt. 2)". Morello recorded guitars along with Johnny Cash during his late career with American Recordings, which was released on Unearthed. Morello was the executive producer of Anti-Flag's 2003 studio album The Terror State. Morello played a short solo on the Benny Mason band song "Exodus IV".

As the Nightwatchman, Morello has often performed alongside Boots Riley, frontman of the Coup; he produced and performed on a track for the Coup's 2006 release Pick a Bigger Weapon. In July 2006, it was reported that Morello and Riley were to collaborate on a project called Street Sweepers. Morello appears in Guitar Hero III: Legends of Rock as a "guitar boss" (the first of three in the career mode of the game) in a night club. Beating him in a one-on-one battle (playing an original composition he recorded for the game) will unlock him as a playable character and will result in the player and Morello playing the master track of "Bulls on Parade" as an encore immediately following the battle. Morello's original composition features many of his trademark guitar effects like those heard in songs such as Audioslave's "Cochise" and "Doesn't Remind Me" and Rage Against the Machine's "Bulls on Parade" and "Sleep Now in the Fire".

In April 2006, Morello produced two tracks for the group Outernational; on the band's website, it states that Morello will be producing their debut album. In 2007, Morello was a featured guitarist in the Mortal Kombat: Armageddon soundtrack, playing guitar for the Armory stage's battle music. On February 23, 2010, Cypress Hill released the second single, "Rise Up", from their album Rise Up featuring Morello on guitar. He is featured on the track "Shut 'Em Down" from the same album. Unlike "Rise Up", which is very similar in style to Morello's rap metal band Rage Against the Machine, it contains strong Latin and rapcore influences. On November 2, 2010, Travis Barker and Morello released a song alongside RZA and Raekwon of Wu-Tang Clan called "Carry It". It would later appear on Travis's debut solo album Give the Drummer Some.

He is collaborating with David Rovics' latest album. Morello was featured in the song "Opinion" in the eponymous debut album by Device, which was released in April 2013. Morello is featured on Linkin Park's album The Hunting Party on the song "Drawbar", released on June 17, 2014. Morello plays the guitar solo of the song "Without End" on Anti-Flag's studio album American Spring released on May 26, 2015. In March 2016, Morello appeared with Knife Party and Pendulum as a guest at Ultra Music Festival Miami. Songs played featuring Morello's guitar work included "Battle Sirens" from his upcoming album The Atlas Underground and a mashup of the two co-headliners entitled "Pendulum VS Knife Party – Tarantula VS Bonfire."

On February 24, 2019, Morello appeared as a presenter at the 91st Academy Awards. In January 2021, Morello teamed with "DJ Free Leonard" to urge President Trump to free Leonard Peltier, by releasing the single "Traditional Way of Life" which contains poetry by Mr. Peltier recorded while incarcerated. Morello teamed up with "DJ Free Leonard" again on July 23rd, 2025 for "Communities Are Not Commodities" in which Morello co-produced the record. In February 2021, Morello was featured on The Pretty Reckless song "And So It Went" on their album Death by Rock and Roll. In April 2021, Morello released a new song and music video with Pussy Riot, "Weather Strike". He has hosted his own weekly show, One Man Revolution, on the Lithium channel at SiriusXM. He joined an additional weekly show March 2, 2021, and an original podcast March 3, 2021.

He was a participant for the "Live for Gaza" online-event which was in April 2021. It featured Gaza's first Rock Band, Osprey V and other Gaza artists, Wafaa Alnjeili, and Badeel Band.

On January 13, 2023, Morello was featured on Måneskin's single and music video for "Gossip". On August 18, 2023, Morello was featured on Babymetal's single and music video for "Metali".

In 2025, Morello and Beartooth contributed a song to the MMORPG video game Final Fantasy XIV after learning that that game's composer Masayoshi Soken was a big fan of Rage Against the Machine. The song "Everything Burns" was added in the game's 7.4 update in December as the theme to the finale of the Dawntrail expansion's raid series.

== Appearances in films ==
Morello has appeared as himself in an array of documentary films such as Sounds Like a Revolution, Biography: KISStory, Iron Maiden: Flight 666, about heavy metal band Iron Maiden's Somewhere Back in Time World Tour and in Chevolution, an exposé about the Guerrillero Heroico photo of Marxist revolutionary Che Guevara. In addition, Morello was cast as a terrorist in Iron Man, an uncredited Son'a officer in Star Trek: Insurrection and later did a cameo in the Star Trek: Voyager episode "Good Shepherd", appeared in the film Made, and had a cameo in Dungeons & Dragons: Honor Among Thieves.

== Writing ==
In 2011, it was announced that Morello, a lifelong comic book fan, would write a new 12-issue comic book series for Dark Horse Comics, entitled Orchid. The series is a post-apocalyptic story in which the title character is "a teenage prostitute who learns that she is more than the role society has imposed upon her." The first issue was published in October 2011, and Morello released an exclusive new song to accompany each issue. Orchid is illustrated by Canadian artist Scott Hepburn. The series was collected into three trade paperback volumes released in 2012 and 2013.

The release party sponsored by Dark Horse was held at Jetpack Comics in Rochester, New Hampshire, on October 12, 2011.

Morello contributed a written introduction to the 2016 edition of The Big Red Songbook, a compendium of wobbly protest music.

In 2021, Morello started publishing a regular newsletter in The New York Times.

== Musicianship ==
=== Guitar playing technique ===
Morello is famed for his playing style, which Guitar World described as a "molotov cocktail of killer riffs, Whammy pedal abuse and toggle switching." Much of his playing consists of heavy metal/punk hybrid riffs and hip-hop-inspired sounds. A 1993 Melody Maker live review of a Rage Against the Machine gig said, "Guitarist Tom Morello wears his guitar high up to wring every sound out of it. Falling bombs, police sirens, scratching – he can do them all." Despite his well-known creativity as a guitarist, Morello started out playing much like popular heavy metal guitarists of the late 1980s. It was only after a "throwaway gig" with two local cover bands that had "Yngwie Malmsteen-level" shredders that Morello realized the futility of practicing scales for "eight hours a day": "So, rather than being a musician, I concentrated on being an artist. Instead of trying to be famous, I made music that was completely authentic."

At the time, Eddie Van Halen had popularized guitars with minimal controls, while Morello instead had a Gibson Explorer-style guitar with "too many knobs and an unsightly toggle switch"—and he decided to try and find uses for them. Morello allowed himself to make "mistakes" and concentrated on creating unique noises that could be used in songs. By the early days of Rage Against the Machine, Morello said he had begun to identify as a DJ, using his guitar to imitate scratching (as on "Bulls on Parade") and working his guitar's pickup selector toggle as a "kill switch" that could be used rhythmically (as on "Know Your Enemy"). Morello has also incorporated various tools into his style, such as scraping the guitar strings with a wrench or pencil, as on "People of the Sun", or tapping a pickup with the guitar's unplugged cable connector, as on "Bullet in the Head". He also notably employs the pitch shifting DigiTech Whammy effects pedal, utilizing both its harmonizing and octave capabilities, which Morello has credited with opening "very new sonic possibilities" to him.

Morello was voted the fifth greatest guitarist of the past 30 years in a 2010 BBC poll.

=== Equipment ===
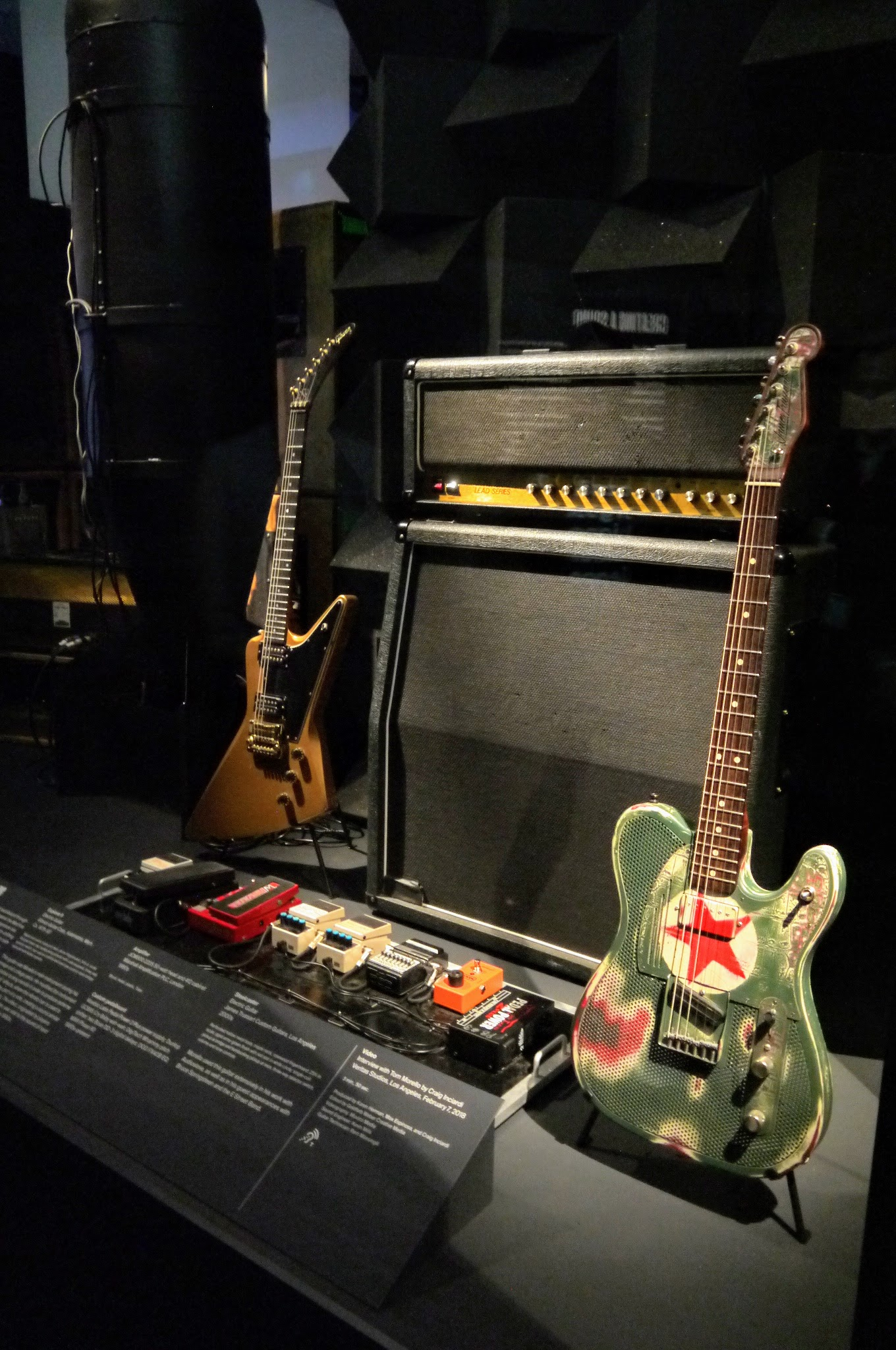
Morello's equipment displayed at Metropolitan Museum of Art

Morello uses a number of often heavily-modified guitars from various manufacturers to create his "unconventionally iconic" guitar tone, and many of them feature slogans in homage to Woody Guthrie's "This Machine Kills Fascists" acoustic. His most famous such guitar—which bears the painted text "Arm the Homeless"—was a Stratocaster-style custom shop build he commissioned before joining his first band in California. Displeased with the result, Morello spent several years modifying it, repeatedly swapping pickups, necks, and bridges in a vain attempt to replicate the tones of Randy Rhoads and Nuno Bettencourt. Morello eventually abandoned this pursuit and chose to instead "take whatever sound this thing makes and I'm going to create with it." He added "Arm the Homeless" text before a gig at the Whisky a Go Go because he liked the "provocative and militant situationist" slogan juxtaposed with smiling hippopotamus graphics he had previously added. The guitar is his main instrument for songs in standard tuning.

For songs played in dropped D, Morello favors a 1982 Fender Telecaster that he traded a Marshall amp head for. The Tele has a maple fretboard and a custom black finish with the text "Sendero Luminoso". Songs like "Killing in the Name", "Freedom", and "Testify" were all recorded with this guitar. Following the disbanding of Rage Against the Machine, Morello sought out new guitars to play. Such guitars included a modified, black Fender Aerodyne-series Stratocaster with the slogan "Soul Power" and a red and black Ibanez Artstar that features onboard effects like distortion, delay, and wah. Acoustic guitars played by Morello include a black Gibson J-45 with the slogan "Black Spartacus" and a custom emblem combining the hammer and sickle with American and Italian flags.

Morello has played the same 50-watt Marshall JCM800 2205 amplifier head paired with a Peavey 4x12 cabinet since the late '80s, and has used the same amp settings since choosing them in 1988 or 1989. He acquired the setup after his previous amp was stolen from his van. Other amps Morello has recorded with include a Fender Bassman head and a Vox AC30. Despite being known for creating unique sounds with his guitars, Morello uses few effects pedals. His long-time setup includes an MXR Phase 90, DOD FX40B Equalizer, Boss DD-2 Digital Delay, DigiTech WH1 Whammy, Boss TR-2 Tremolo and a Dunlop Cry Baby Wah-Wah, all powered by a Voodoo Lab Pedal Power Plus power supply.

In 2023, Neural DSP released an official signature audio plug-in based on Morello's gear.

== Politics ==
=== Political views ===
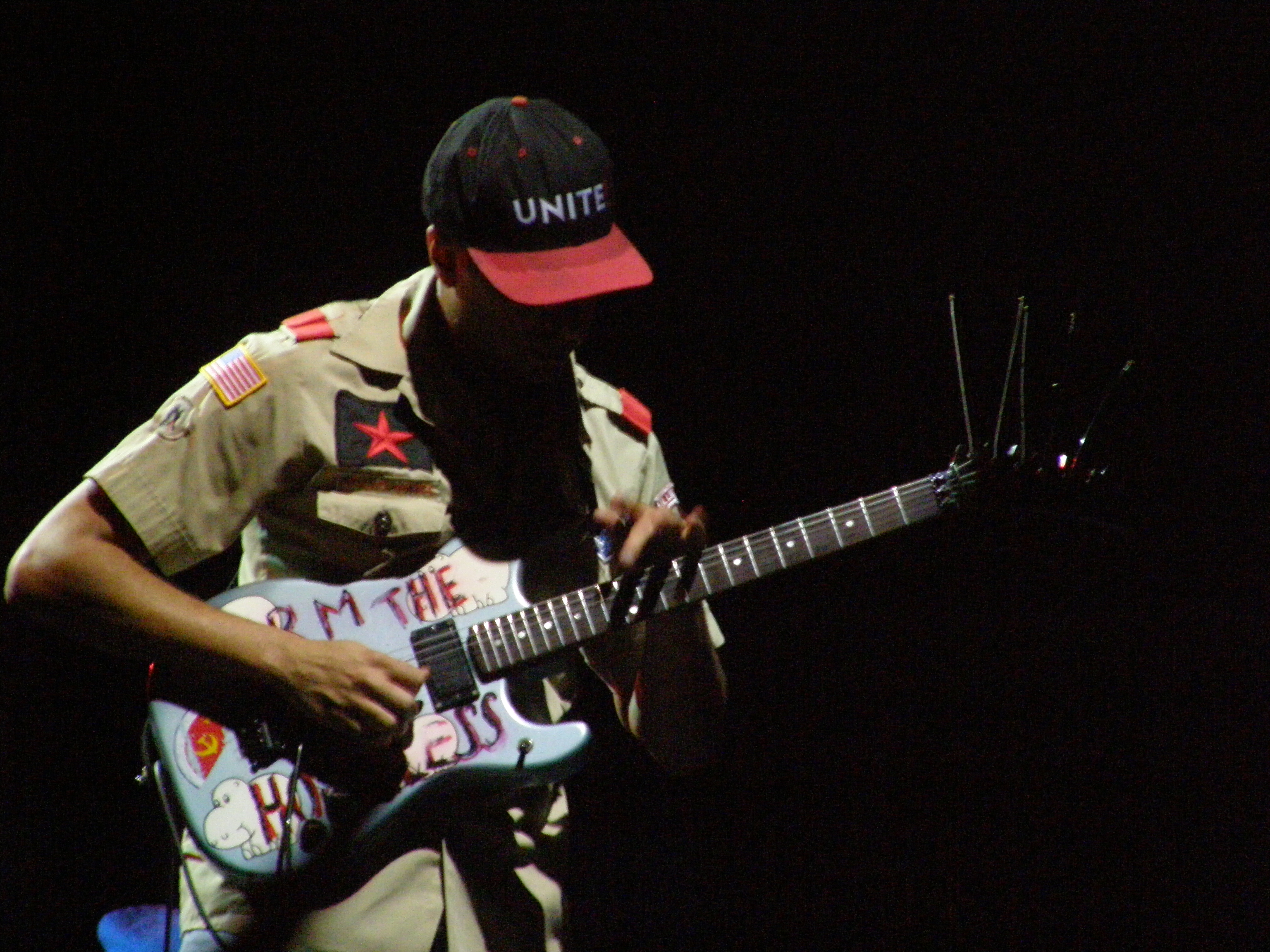
Morello in 2007.

Morello, as well as fellow members of Rage Against the Machine, holds left-wing political views. Morello in particular identifies as a socialist, and he has called socialism a necessity for the world, saying: "I think [socialism is] a necessity, to save the planet [...] Look at how capitalism has responded to the global pandemic–it's a disaster. Look at how capitalism has responded to the impending environmental crisis – it's a disaster. Look at how capitalism has responded to racism and anti-immigrant sentiment in the 21st century – it's a disaster."

Morello frequently uses communist imagery, such as hammer and sickle stickers on his guitars, and Red star hats. Following the death of Cuban leader Fidel Castro, he expressed support, saying: "While I don't agree with all that Fidel Castro did there is ample reason why he is vilified in the US and yet remains a huge hero throughout the Third World [...] By defying Yankee imperialism for 50 years, instituting the best healthcare, child immunization and literacy systems in the Western Hemisphere (surpassing the U.S. and Canada), exporting doctors to countries in need all over the globe [...], and being an unrepentant advocate of the poor and exploited it is no surprise that millions will mourn his passing." Regarding his childhood, Morello cites the Black Panther party, Marxist revolutionary Che Guevara and radical left militant organization Weather Underground as "Very important to [him]. These were people who unapologetically stood up to injustice with the most forceful means necessary."

Rage has expressed support for guerrilla movements such as the Zapatista Army of National Liberation, Shining Path as well as social and political movements such as the Brazilian Landless Workers' Movement.

In May 2021, more than 600 musicians, including members of Rage Against the Machine, added their signature to an open letter calling for a boycott of performances in Israel until Israel ends its occupation of the Palestinian territories. Morello called for a ceasefire in the Gaza war.

In 2023, he attended the 50th anniversary commemoration of the 1973 Chilean coup d'état, saying that the United States "shares responsibility" for the coup.

=== Activism ===
Morello, with fellow members of Rage Against the Machine, protested the "Parental Advisory" sticker, introduced in 1987 in the U.S., on explicit albums and singles by Tipper Gore's Parents Music Resource Center. The protest consisted of the band refusing to perform at Lollapalooza 1993: They took the stage naked, mouths covered in duct tape, and bodies painted with the organization's abbreviation, PMRC.

Morello is a member of the Industrial Workers of the World.

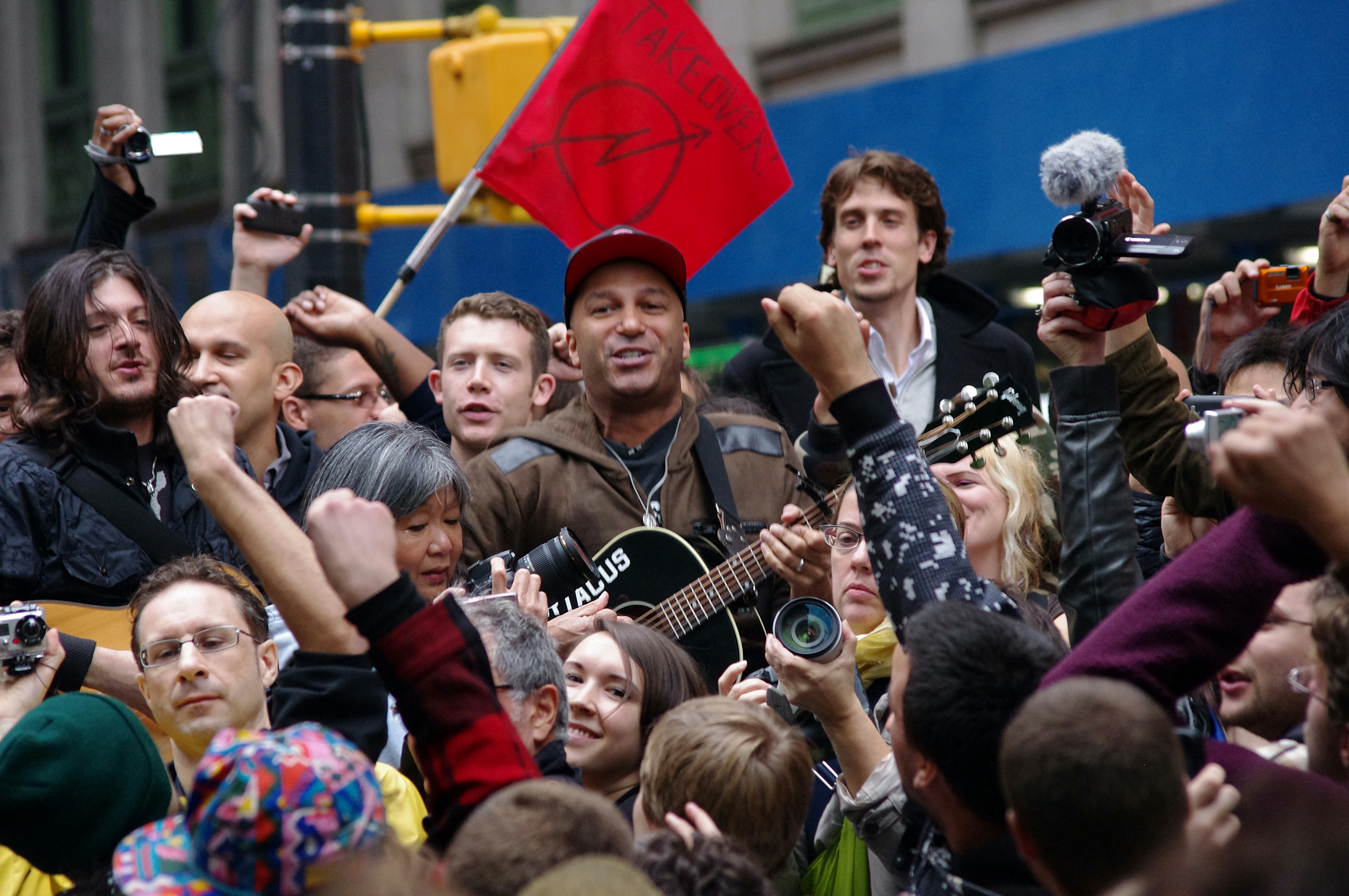
Morello playing Occupy Wall Street in New York, October 2011

On August 27, 2008, the musician performed in Denver, Colorado, in opposition to the Commission on Presidential Debates exclusion of third party candidates from the nationally televised debates at the Open the Debates rally. Morello performed "This Land is Your Land" as the Nightwatchman and endorsed independent presidential candidate Ralph Nader. Sean Penn, Jello Biafra, Brooke Smith and Cindy Sheehan were also part of the rally.

In October 2009, Morello, among a number of musicians, sued the U.S. federal government for the declassification of all documents relating to the use of music in interrogations at the Guantanamo Bay detention camp. He stated:

Guantanamo is known around the world as one of the places where human beings have been tortured – from waterboarding to stripping, hooding and forcing detainees into humiliating sexual acts–playing music for 72 hours in a row at volumes just below that to shatter the eardrums. Guantanamo may be Dick Cheney's idea of America, but it's not mine. The fact that music I helped create was used in crimes against humanity sickens me.

During his 2008 presidential campaign, President Obama had promised to close down Guantánamo in 2009. After being elected, Obama's attempts were largely stymied by Republican opposition in Congress. On 15 August 2016, 15 prisoners were transferred from the prison. Twelve Yemeni nationals and three Afghans were transferred to the United Arab Emirates, bringing the total number of prisoners to 61 with 20 more cleared for transfer. President Obama did not close the prison before leaving office but had reduced the number of prisoners to 41. On February 11, 2021, President Joe Biden announced a formal review of the camp, with a stated goal of closing it by the end of his term. At the time, there were 40 prisoners at the camp, most of whom had been held for nearly two decades without being charged or tried. As of March 2022, one prisoner, Mohammed al-Qahtani, was expatriated to Saudi Arabia, bringing the total number of prisoners to 38.

On February 21, 2011, Morello organized and performed an acoustic concert in support of the protests over collective bargaining rights in Madison, Wisconsin. The concert featured the MC5's Wayne Kramer and Boston punk band Street Dogs. Morello wrote an article in Rolling Stone about his experience.

Morello played at many Occupy movements, including Occupy Wall Street as well as Occupy Los Angeles, San Francisco, Chicago, Seattle, Vancouver, British Columbia, Nottingham and Newcastle, England protests. When Republican nominee for vice president in the 2012 election Paul Ryan said that he liked the music of Beethoven, Rage Against the Machine, and Led Zeppelin, Morello responded with an op-ed in Rolling Stone, stating, "Paul Ryan's love for Rage Against The Machine is amusing, because he is the embodiment of the machine that our music has been raging against for two decades."

In June 2013, Morello and numerous other celebrities appeared in a video showing support for Chelsea Manning.

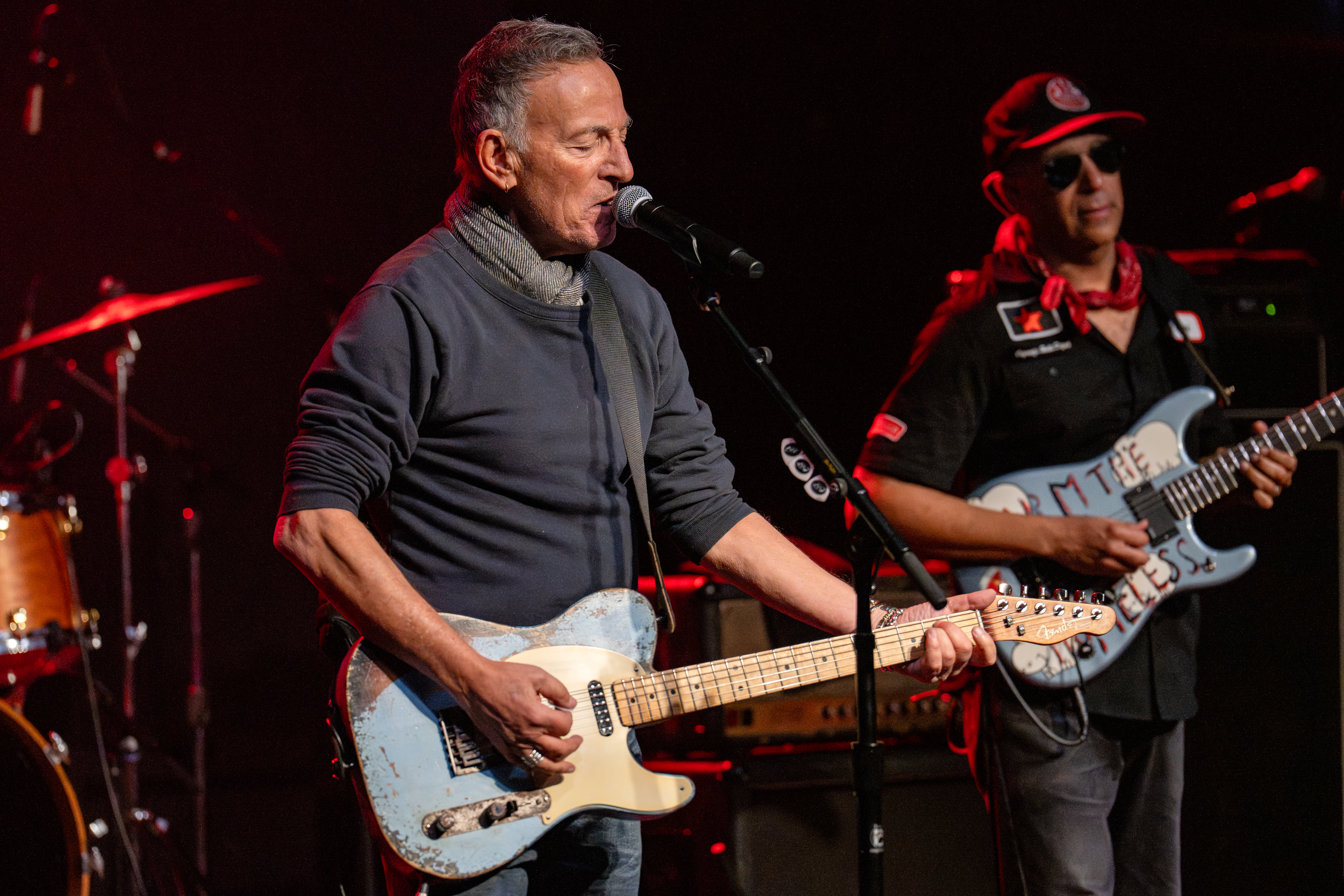
Morello and Bruce Springsteen at the Defend Minnesota concert, January 2026

On September 26, 2014, Morello played a benefit concert in Seattle for 15 Now, the group launched by Socialist Alternative and Kshama Sawant to raise the minimum wage to $15/hour. The concert was aimed at expanding the organization nationally. After playing the show, Morello encouraged a boycott of The 5 Point Cafe, a local diner in Seattle, which he claimed on Twitter was "anti-Kenyan" and "anti-worker", encouraging his fans to "spread the word". The restaurant's owner, David Meinert, responded, stating that "Rock stars don't get special treatment at The 5 Point", and claiming that "Tom and his crew didn't get let in as the place was at capacity and there was a line. No one was being let in." Morello responded to Meinert, stating that he would show "leniency" and "forgive" Meinert if he embraced a $15 minimum wage.

On January 30, 2026, Morello held the "Defend Minnesota" benefit concert in Minneapolis which also included a performance by Rise Against along with a surprise guest performance by Bruce Springsteen who performed three songs including the live debut of his song "Streets of Minneapolis" along with "The Ghost of Tom Joad" featuring Morello, and a cover of John Lennon's "Power to the People" in which he was joined by Morello and other performers. The concert was held at 10:30am with tickets selling at just $25 with 100% of the proceeds from the concert going to the families of both Renée Good and Alex Pretti.

On October 3, 2026, Morello hosted and performed at the Power to the People Festival at Merriweather Post Pavilion in Columbia, MD. Bruce Springsteen, who first announced the festival during his May 27, 2026 show in Washington D.C. on his Land of Hope and Dreams American Tour, performed with Morello. Foo Fighters, Joan Baez, Dropkick Murphys, Dave Matthews, Jack Black and many others also performed at the festival. The festival was held in response to President Donald Trump.

=== Axis of Justice ===
Morello and Serj Tankian of System of a Down are the co-founders of Axis of Justice, a political group whose declared purpose is "to bring together musicians, fans of music, and grassroots political organizations to fight for social justice together." They "aim to build a bridge between fans of music around the world and local political organizations to effectively organize around issues of peace, human rights, and economic justice." The group has worked for such causes as immigrant rights and death penalty abolition. Its recommended book list includes such authors as Karl Marx, Che Guevara, George Orwell, Noam Chomsky, Mumia Abu-Jamal and Grant Morrison.

Morello and Tankian, together with a handful of other artists, including Maynard James Keenan, Wayne Kramer of the MC5, the hip-hop group Jurassic 5, and Michael "Flea" Balzary of the Red Hot Chili Peppers, released a live recording of covers and original songs, titled Axis of Justice: Concert Series Volume 1.

On April 6, 2006, Morello was honored with the Eleanor Roosevelt Human Rights Award for his support of worker's rights and for his AOJ work. Morello has worked on labor campaigns: the Guess sweatshop boycott, the Los Angeles janitors' strike, the Taco Bell boycott, the southern California grocery workers strike and lockout, and the Democratic Socialists of America's Starbucks unionization campaign, among others.

Morello was a supporter of the 2006 United States immigration reform protests around the US. Morello played as the Nightwatchman at MacArthur Park in Los Angeles and has featured articles on AOJ. In September 2006, Morello was one of 400 protesters arrested protesting in support of immigrant hotel workers' rights, in what organizers called "the largest act of civil disobedience in the history of Los Angeles".

=== Power To The People Festival ===
On October 3, 2026 Morello curated a 10-hour live concert titled Power to the People which featured Bruce Springsteen, Foo Fighters, Dave Matthews, Joan Baez, Public Enemy, Jack Black, Dropkick Murphys, Cypress Hill, and others.

== Personal life ==
Morello and his wife Denise have two sons. His older son is named Rhoads, in honor of heavy metal guitarist Randy Rhoads. Morello was raised Catholic and is a vegetarian. He lives in the Laurel Canyon neighborhood of Los Angeles. Morello is a longtime fan of both the Chicago Cubs of the MLB and the Los Angeles Rams of the NFL and named his second son Roman after former Rams quarterback Roman Gabriel.

== Discography ==
Solo; as Tom Morello

- The Atlas Underground (2018)
- Comandante (2020)
- The Atlas Underground Fire (2021)
- The Atlas Underground Flood (2021)
- Everyone Gets Everything They Want (2026)

Solo; as The Nightwatchman

- One Man Revolution (2007)
- The Fabled City (2008)
- Union Town (2011)
- World Wide Rebel Songs (2011)

with Lock Up

- Something Bitchin' This Way Comes (1989)

with Rage Against the Machine

- Rage Against the Machine (1992)
- Evil Empire (1996)
- Live & Rare (1998)
- The Battle of Los Angeles (1999)
- Renegades (2000)
- Live at the Grand Olympic Auditorium (2003)

with Audioslave

- Audioslave (2002)
- Out of Exile (2005)
- Revelations (2006)

with Street Sweeper Social Club

- Street Sweeper Social Club (2009)

with Bruce Springsteen

- Wrecking Ball (2012)
- High Hopes (2014)

with Prophets of Rage

- Prophets of Rage (2017)

== Filmography ==
- Saturday Night Live (Episode #21.17, 1996) .... Musical Guest (Rage Against the Machine)
- Star Trek: Insurrection (1998) .... Son'a officer (uncredited)
- Star Trek: Voyager (Season 6, Episode 20, 2000, "Good Shepherd") .... Crewman Mitchell
- Made (2001) .... Best Man
- Berkeley (2005) .... Blue
- Metal: A Headbanger's Journey (2005) .... Himself
- Iron Man (2008) .... Insurgent #5
- Chevolution (2008) .... Himself
- Iron Maiden: Flight 666 (2009) .... Himself
- Pacific Rim (2013) .... Featured
- Bruce Springsteen's High Hopes (2014) .... Himself
- High Hopes In South Africa (2014) .... Himself
- Metal Lords (2022) .... Himself
- Dungeons and Dragons: Honor Among Thieves (2023) .... Kimathi Stormhollow
