= Carl Restivo =

American singer-songwriter

- Restivo in 2024

Background information
- Genres: Pop, rock, hip hop
- Occupations: Musician, songwriter, record producer
- Instruments: Guitar, bass, vocals, keyboards
- Labels: Columbia, Epic

Carl Restivo is a multi-instrumentalist, songwriter, record producer, and audio engineer. He has toured with Rihanna, Tom Morello's Freedom Fighter Orchestra supporting The Nightwatchman, Perry Farrell's Satellite Party, and Street Sweeper Social Club, who toured with Nine Inch Nails and Jane's Addiction.

== Career ==
Most recently, Restivo wrapped as music producer on the Netflix film Metal Lords, which was released on April 8, 2022. The release of the film was accompanied by the release of the original song, "Machinery of Torment", co-written by Restivo, D.B. Weiss, and Tom Morello, which can also be heard throughout the film.

Restivo co-produced Nandi Bushell and Roman Morello's original song "The Children Will Rise Up" which was released in November 2021 and endorsed by President Obama.

Restivo was the production supervisor on Tom Morello’s latest album The Atlas Underground. The album featured Portugal the Man, Marcus Mumford, Knife Party, Pretty Lights, Steve Aoki, RZA, GZA, Killer Mike, Big Boi, Whethan, Vic Mensa, and himself on the song “Vigilante Nocturno”, which he also produced “Lucky One”, featuring K.Flay. Additionally, Restivo is Morello's music director and recently completed a tour with dates opening up for Muse.

Prior to, Restivo co-wrote the song "Go All the Way (Into the Twilight)" with Perry Farrell which was released on the Twilight soundtrack. The soundtrack was nominated for a Grammy Award and has sold 2.5 million copies worldwide. Restivo also co-wrote the song "Underground" which was Jane's Addiction No. 1 track on their album The Great Escape Artist and in the widely popular Dobel Tequila commercial.

He has also worked on the in-game music for Sony PlayStation's Infamous video game and secured songs in Sony's Fist Fight, in Martin Scorsese's film Revenge of the Green Dragons and Anchorman 2 with songs placed among various networks mostly used by FX, the MLB and the NFL.

Restivo got his start by selling his first track to Xzibit and Kurupt in the 1990s and cut his teeth working with Wyclef Jean. He helped develop and record Jean's album, The Preacher's Son. He and Jean co-wrote the song "Linda" for the record and Restivo was one of the featured artists. Restivo also has the distinct honor of being uncredited in playing acoustic (rhythm and lead) guitar on the hit "Hips Don't Lie" by Shakira featuring Wyclef Jean.

Since then, he has recorded, produced, and written songs with and/or for Tom Morello, K. Flay, Bishop Briggs, Jerry Wonda, 50 Cent, Nuno Bettencourt, Steve Perry, Patti LaBelle, among others.

Throughout his career, as a guest artist, Restivo has performed lead vocals and/or guitar or bass with Rihanna, Jason Derulo, Tom Morello, Perry Farrell, Chris Cornell, Taio Cruz, Nuno Bettencourt, Trent Reznor, Smokey Robinson, Jerry Cantrell, Wyclef Jean, Extreme, AFI, Ben Harper, Billy Idol, Cypress Hill, Dave Navarro, Deborah Harry, Ed Palermo Big Band, Flea, Gilby Clarke, Graham Nash, Iggy Pop, Jackson Browne, Jason Bonham, Joe Satriani, John Densmore, Mike Keneally, Napoleon Murphy Brock, Peter DiStefano, Ray Manzarek, Robbie Krieger, Sammy Hagar, Slash, Stephen Perkins, Steve Vai, Stewart Copeland, Travis Barker, and Wayne Kramer among others.

Restivo is a graduate of New York University and in 2006 he moved from New York City to Los Angeles to work as the music director of the (at the time called) Paul Green School of Rock in Hollywood, California at the request of Paul Green himself. He left the school (now called School of Rock) in 2010 after 100 shows and co-founded The Rock School Scholarship Fund, a 501(c)3 charity to pay tuition for financially disadvantaged students at qualifying rock music schools.

His film, television and live performance credits include: Dancing with the Stars, Good Morning America, Last Call with Carson Daly, Late Night with Conan O'Brien, Late Night with Jimmy Fallon, Late Show with David Letterman, BBC Radio 1's Big Weekend, Saturday Night Live, Teen Choice Awards, The Apprentice, The Ellen DeGeneres Show, The Late Late Show with Craig Ferguson, The Tonight Show with Jay Leno, and The View, Lollapalooza, Outside Lands, Coachella, SXSW, Pepsi Fan Jam Super Bowl Concert, Download Festival (UK), O2 Wireless Festival (UK), Hard Rock Calling (UK) and Restivo has had the honor of singing the National Anthem at the Brooklyn Nets game.

== Songwriting credits ==
Song	Year	Artist(s)	Album
"Linda"	2003	Wyclef Jean	The Preacher's Son
"Go All The Way (Into The Twilight)"	2008	Perry Farrell	Twilight (2008 film)
"King of the Ladies"	2008	Extreme	Saudades de Rock
"Underground"	2011	Jane's Addiction	The Great Escape Artist
"Vigilante Nocturno"	2018	Tom Morello	The Atlas Underground
"Lucky One" ( featuring K.Flay)	2018	Tom Morello	The Atlas Underground
"Weather Strike"	2021	Tom Morello Pussy Riot	The Catastrophists EP
"Radium Girls"	2021	Tom Morello The Bloody Beetroots	The Catastrophists EP
"Lightning Over Mexico" ( featuring Ana Tijoux)	2021	Tom Morello The Bloody Beetroots	The Catastrophists EP
"Machinery of Torment"	2022		Metal Lords
"Beautiful Girls"	2023	Extreme	Six

== Producing credits ==
Song	Year	Artist(s)	Album
"Vigilante Nocturno"	2018	Tom Morello	The Atlas Underground
"Lucky One" ( featuring K.Flay)	2018	Tom Morello	The Atlas Underground
"Champion" ( featuring Tom Morello)	2019	Bishop Briggs	Non-album single
"The Children Will Rise Up!”	2021	Nandi Bushell Roman Morello	Non-album single
"Weather Strike"	2021	Tom Morello Pussy Riot	The Catastrophists EP
"Radium Girls"	2021	Tom Morello The Bloody Beetroots	The Catastrophists EP
"Lightning Over Mexico" ( featuring Ana Tijoux)	2021	Tom Morello The Bloody Beetroots	The Catastrophists EP
"Warrior Spirit" ( featuring Rodrigo y Gabriela)	2021	Tom Morello Rodrigo y Gabriela	The Atlas Underground Flood
"Have I Seen The Way" ( featuring Alex Lifeson, Kirk Hammett, Dr. Fresch)	2021	Tom Morello	The Atlas Underground Flood
"Natural's Not in It" ( featuring Serj Tankian, Gang of Four)	2021	Tom Morello	Non-album single
"Come On Up To The House" ( featuring X Ambassadors)	2022	Tom Morello	Non-album single
"Machinery of Torment"	2022		Metal Lords
"Soldier In the Army Of Love"	2024	Tom Morello	Non-album single
