= Rage Against the Machine discography =

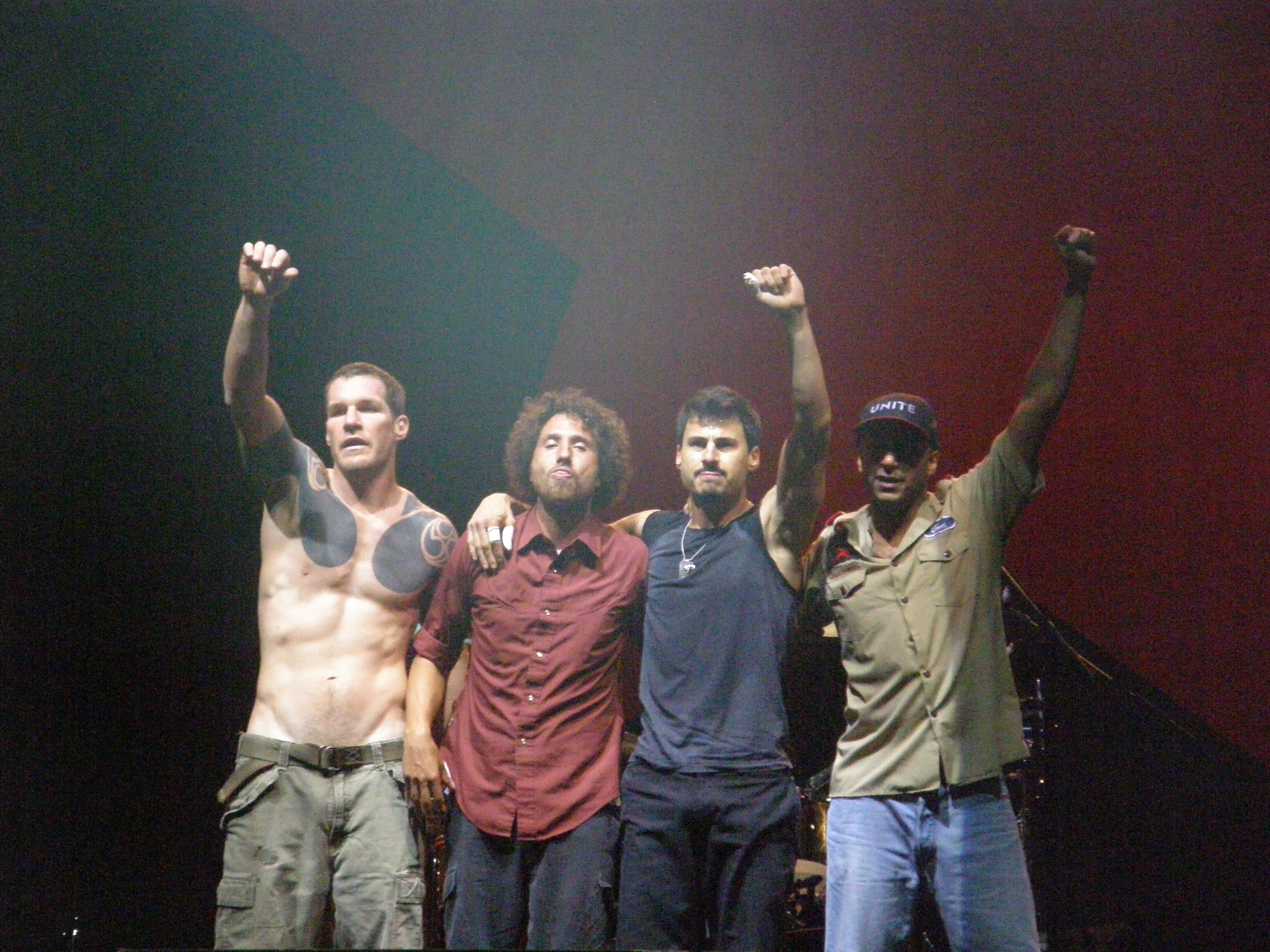
- Rage Against the Machine in 2007. From left to right: Tim Commerford, Zack de la Rocha, Brad Wilk and Tom Morello.
- Studio albums: 4
- Live albums: 5
- Compilation albums: 1
- Singles: 17
- Video albums: 4
- Music videos: 15
- Demo albums: 1
- Other appearances: 1

The discography of Rage Against the Machine, an American rock band, consists of four studio albums, five live albums, one compilation album, one demo album, 17 singles, four video albums and 15 music videos. Formed in Los Angeles, California in 1991 by vocalist Zack de la Rocha, guitarist Tom Morello, bassist Tim Commerford and drummer Brad Wilk, the band signed to Epic Records and released its self-titled debut album in 1992. The album reached number 45 on the United States Billboard 200 and was certified three times platinum by the Recording Industry Association of America (RIAA) for sales in excess of three million units. Rage Against the Machine singles "Killing in the Name", "Bullet in the Head" and "Bombtrack" charted in the United Kingdom and several other regions.

The band returned in 1996 with its second studio album Evil Empire, which topped the Billboard 200 and was again certified three times platinum by the RIAA. Lead single "Bulls on Parade" was the band's first to chart in the US, reaching number 11 on the Alternative Songs chart, number 36 on the Mainstream Rock chart, and number 62 on the Radio Songs chart. The group's first video release, 1997's Rage Against the Machine, reached number 2 on the Billboard Music Video Sales chart and was certified double platinum by the RIAA. 1999's The Battle of Los Angeles topped the Billboard 200 and the Canadian Albums Chart.

Rage Against the Machine released its final studio album, a collection of cover versions called Renegades, in 2000, reaching number 14 on the Billboard 200. The band broke up prior to the album's release, after de la Rocha announced his departure in October that year. The Battle of Mexico City video album was released in 2001, reaching number 4 on the Billboard Music Video Sales chart. Two years later, Live at the Grand Olympic Auditorium reached number 7 on the Music Video Sales chart and the top 100 of the Billboard 200.

In 2009, the band achieved its first UK Singles Chart number 1 when "Killing in the Name" became Christmas number one as the result of a Facebook campaign. To celebrate the achievement, the group reunited for a free concert at Finsbury Park in London on June 6, 2010, which was later released in the form of Live at Finsbury Park in 2015 and reached number 2 on the Billboard Music Video Sales chart.

== Albums ==
=== Studio albums ===
List of studio albums, with selected chart positions and certifications
Title	Album details	Peak chart positions										Certifications
Title	Album details	US	AUS	AUT	CAN	FIN	GER	NZ	SWE	SWI	UK	Certifications
Rage Against the Machine	Released: November 6, 1992; Label: Epic; Formats: CD, LP, CS, MD	45	12	—	86	—	22	9	22	16	17	RIAA: 3× Platinum; ARIA: 5× Platinum; BPI: 3× Platinum; BVMI: Gold; MC: Platinum; RMNZ: 3× Platinum
Evil Empire	Released: April 16, 1996; Label: Epic; Formats: CD, LP, CS, MD	1	2	2	4	5	2	3	1	4	4	RIAA: 3× Platinum; ARIA: Gold; BPI: Gold; MC: Platinum; RMNZ: Gold
The Battle of Los Angeles	Released: November 2, 1999; Label: Epic; Formats: CD, LP, CS, MD	1	2	17	1	2	7	1	4	15	23	RIAA: 2× Platinum; ARIA: Platinum; BPI: Gold; MC: 3× Platinum; RMNZ: Platinum
Renegades	Released: December 5, 2000; Label: Epic; Formats: CD, LP, CS	14	10	66	13	25	47	—	—	49	71	RIAA: Platinum; ARIA: Platinum; BPI: Gold; RMNZ: Gold
"—" denotes a release that did not chart or was not issued in that region.

=== Live albums ===
List of live albums, with selected chart positions and certifications
Title	Album details	Peak chart positions						Certifications
Title	Album details	US	AUS	CAN	FRA	NZ	UK	Certifications
Live & Rare	Released: June 30, 1998; Label: Sony Japan; Format: CD, CS, LP	—	—	—	—	—	—	
Live at the Grand Olympic Auditorium	Released: November 25, 2003; Label: Epic; Formats: CD, 2LP	94	69	70	101	34	151	ARIA: Platinum
Democratic National Convention 2000	Released: April 21, 2018; Label: Epic; Formats: LP	—	—	—	—	—	—	
The Battle of Mexico City	Released: June 12, 2021 (Note: The Battle of Mexico City was originally released in VHS format on February 20, 2001.); Label: Epic; Formats: 2LP	70	—	—	—	—	—	
Live on Tour 1993	Released: April 21, 2025; Label: Legacy; Formats: 2LP	149	—	—	—	—	—	
"—" denotes a release that did not chart or was not issued in that region.

=== Compilation albums ===
List of compilation albums
Title	Album details
The Collection	Released: May 28, 2010; Labels: Epic, Sony, Legacy; Format: 5CD box set

=== Demo albums ===
List of demo albums
Title	Album details
Rage Against the Machine	Released: December 1991; Labels: none (self-released); Format: CS

== Singles ==
List of singles, with selected chart positions and certifications, showing year released and album name
Title	Year	Peak chart positions										Certifications	Album
Title	Year	US	US Alt.	US Main.	AUS	FRA	NED	NOR	NZ	SWE	UK	Certifications	Album
"Killing in the Name"	1992	—	—	—	7	109	13	—	8	—	1 (Note: On its original release in 1992, Killing in the Name reached number 25 in the UK. It later reached number 1 during a campaign in 2009 based solely on downloads, without a physical single re-release.)	ARIA: Platinum; BPI: 3× Platinum; BVMI: Platinum; RMNZ: 6× Platinum	Rage Against the Machine
"Bullet in the Head"	1993	—	—	—	53	—	47	—	19	—	16	RMNZ: Gold	Rage Against the Machine
"Bombtrack"	1993	—	—	—	173	—	8	—	11	—	37	BPI: Silver; RMNZ: Platinum	Rage Against the Machine
"Freedom"	1993	—	—	—	109	—	—	—	17	—	—		Rage Against the Machine
"Bulls on Parade"	1996	62	11	36	29	27	46	4	22	9	8	BPI: Silver; RMNZ: 2× Platinum	Evil Empire
"People of the Sun"	1996	—	—	—	123	—	—	—	—	—	26		Evil Empire
"Vietnow"	1997	—	—	—	—	—	—	—	—	—	—		Evil Empire
"The Ghost of Tom Joad"	1997	—	34	35	—	—	—	—	—	—	—		N/A
"Guerrilla Radio"	1999	69	6	11	57	—	—	17	—	42	32	BPI: Silver; RMNZ: Platinum	The Battle of Los Angeles
"Sleep Now in the Fire"	2000	— (Note: "Sleep Now in the Fire" did not enter the Billboard Hot 100, but peaked at number 12 on the Bubbling Under Hot 100 chart.)	8	16	94	—	—	—	—	—	43	RMNZ: Gold	The Battle of Los Angeles
"Testify"	2000	—	16	22	—	—	—	—	—	—	—	RMNZ: Gold	The Battle of Los Angeles
"—" denotes a release that did not chart or was not issued in that region.

== Promotional singles ==
List of promotional singles, with selected chart positions, showing year released, certifications, and album name
Title	Year	Peak chart positions			Certifications	Album
Title	Year	US Bub.	US Alt.	US Main.	Certifications	Album
"Wake Up"	1992	—	—	—	BPI: Silver	Rage Against the Machine
"Year of tha Boomerang"	1994	—	—	—		Higher Learning
"Down Rodeo"	1996	—	—	—		Evil Empire
"No Shelter"	1998	—	33	30		Godzilla: The Album
"Renegades of Funk"	2001	9	9	19		Renegades
"How I Could Just Kill a Man"	2001	—	37	39		Renegades
"—" denotes a release that did not chart or was not issued in that region.

== Other appearances ==
List of other appearances, showing year released and album name
Title	Year	Album	Ref.
"Darkness"	1994	The Crow: Original Motion Picture Soundtrack	
"Snoop Bounce" (Roc N Roll Remix) (with Snoop Dogg and Charlie Wilson)	2001	Death Row: Snoop Doggy Dogg at His Best	

== Videos ==
=== Video albums ===
List of video albums, with selected chart positions and certifications
Title	Album details	Charts			Certifications
Title	Album details	US	AUS	UK	Certifications
Rage Against the Machine	Released: November 25, 1997; Label: Epic; Formats: DVD, VHS, LD	2	12	23	RIAA: 2× Platinum; ARIA: Gold; BPI: Gold
The Battle of Mexico City	Released: February 20, 2001; Label: Epic; Formats: DVD, VHS	4	5	5	RIAA: Gold; ARIA: 2× Platinum; BPI: Gold
Live at the Grand Olympic Auditorium	Released: November 25, 2003; Label: Epic; Format: DVD	7	14	41	RIAA: Gold; ARIA: 3× Platinum; BPI: Gold
Live at Finsbury Park	Released: October 16, 2015; Labels: Eagle Vision, Universal; Formats: DVD, BD	2	—	4	
"—" denotes a release that did not chart or was not issued in that region.

=== Music videos ===
List of music videos, showing year released and director(s)
Title	Year	Director(s)	Ref.
"Killing in the Name"	1992	Peter Gideon	
"Bullet in the Head"	1993	BBC Worldwide	
"Bombtrack"	1993	Peter Christopherson	
"Freedom"	1993	Peter Christopherson	
"Bulls on Parade"	1996	Peter Christopherson	
"People of the Sun"	1996	Peter Christopherson	
"The Ghost of Tom Joad"	1997	Heather Parry	
"No Shelter"	1998	Joe Demaio	
"Guerrilla Radio"	1999	Honey	
"Sleep Now in the Fire"	2000	Michael Moore	
"Testify"	2000	Michael Moore	
"Renegades of Funk"	2000	Steven Murashige	
"How I Could Just Kill a Man"	2003	Harri Kristin	

== See also ==
- List of songs recorded by Rage Against the Machine
