= Public Service Announcement Tour =

2022 concert tour by Rage Against the Machine

- Tour by Rage Against the Machine
- Promotional poster for the tour
- Location: North America
- Start date: July 9, 2022
- End date: August 14, 2022
- Legs: 1 (2 cancelled)
- No. of shows: 19 (38 cancelled)

Rage Against the Machine concert chronology
- Reunion Tour (2007–2011); Public Service Announcement Tour (2022); N/A

The Public Service Announcement Tour was a reunion tour by American rock band Rage Against the Machine, which began on July 9, 2022, at Alpine Valley Music Theatre in East Troy, Wisconsin, and concluded early on August 14, 2022, at Madison Square Garden in New York City. This tour marked the band's first live appearances in eleven years, and their first full-length tour in 22 years, after they completed the accompanying tour for its third album The Battle of Los Angeles.

The tour was originally scheduled to start in North America in March 2020, followed by a series of European festival appearances, but it was pushed back to the summer of 2021, then to 2022 and again to 2023, due to the COVID-19 pandemic before many of the dates were cancelled. It was announced by drummer Brad Wilk in January 2024 that there would be no more live activities under the Rage Against the Machine name, making the Public Service Announcement their final tour.

== Background ==
On November 1, 2019, it was reported that Rage Against the Machine were reuniting for their first shows in nine years in the spring of 2020, including two appearances at that year's Coachella Valley Music and Arts Festival.

On February 10, 2020, the band announced the dates and venues for their 2020 world tour. The tour was going to begin with a North American leg in March, but it was repeatedly postponed, first to July and then to June 2021, due to the onset of the COVID-19 pandemic.

On May 1, 2020, Rage Against the Machine announced on its official website that, due to circumstances influenced by the ongoing pandemic, all the tour dates that were scheduled to take place that year had been postponed to 2021:

Rage Against The Machine will commence our tour at such a time when we are confident it will be safe for our fans. The rerouted dates (heath and safety permitting) are below and YOUR TICKETS WILL BE HONORED for the postponed shows. During this difficult time we also respect the fans who want their ticket money back. We've requested and confirmed that, as of this weekend, ANYONE who wants a refund can begin the process at your point of purchase. We sincerely hope that each one of you and your families and friends stay safe and well and that music is bringing you solace and inspiration. We look forward to seeing you.

Initially, however, the band was still scheduled to perform at 2020's Coachella Valley Music and Arts Festival, which had been pushed back from April to October before it was officially canceled for similar reasons as the tour postponement.

On April 8, 2021, it was announced that the "Public Service Announcement" Tour had once again been rescheduled to the spring and summer of 2022.

On July 11, during the tour's second show in Chicago, Zack de la Rocha injured his leg during the fourth song of the evening. He performed the rest of the show sitting on a speaker, and remained seated for all subsequent North American performances, being assisted on and off stage. On August 11, it was announced that the European leg of the tour had been cancelled, as de la Rocha had been advised to rest as to allow for proper healing. Then almost two months later on October 4, via a statement on the band's official Instagram account, de la Rocha announced they had made the difficult decision to cancel all remaining stops on the tour, including the 2023 North American leg, due to the severity of his injury.

On January 3, 2024, drummer Brad Wilk announced that there would be no more live activities (including a tour) as Rage Against the Machine, making the Public Service Announcement tour their last live outing.

== Setlist ==
The following set list is from the July 12 concert in Chicago. It is not intended to represent all dates throughout the tour.

1. "Bombtrack"
2. "People of the Sun"
3. "Bulls on Parade"
4. "Bullet in the Head"
5. "Revolver" (interlude)
6. "Testify"
7. "Tire Me"
8. "Take The Power Back"
9. "Close Your Eyes (And Count to Fuck)" (w/ Run the Jewels)
10. "Wake Up"
11. "Guerrilla Radio"
12. "Down Rodeo"
13. "Without a Face"
14. "Know Your Enemy"
15. "Calm Like a Bomb"
16. "Sleep Now in the Fire"
17. "No Shelter"
18. "War Within a Breath"
19. "The Ghost of Tom Joad"
20. "Snakecharmer" (interlude)
21. "Township Rebellion" (interlude)
22. "Freedom"
23. "Killing in the Name"

== Tour dates ==
Date	City	Country	Venue	Attendance	Revenue
North America
July 9, 2022	East Troy	United States	Alpine Valley Music Theatre	—	—
July 11, 2022	Chicago	United States	United Center	24,252 / 24,252	$3,032,750
July 12, 2022	Chicago	United States	United Center	24,252 / 24,252	$3,032,750
July 15, 2022 (Note: part of Ottawa Bluesfest.)	Ottawa	Canada	LeBreton Flats	—	—
July 16, 2022 (Note: part of Festival d'été de Québec.)	Quebec City	Canada	Plains of Abraham	—	—
July 19, 2022	Hamilton	Canada	FirstOntario Centre	—	—
July 21, 2022	Toronto	Canada	Scotiabank Arena	—	—
July 23, 2022	Toronto	Canada	Scotiabank Arena	—	—
July 25, 2022	Buffalo	United States	KeyBank Center	—	—
July 27, 2022	Cleveland	United States	Rocket Mortgage FieldHouse	—	—
July 29, 2022	Pittsburgh	United States	PPG Paints Arena	—	—
July 31, 2022	Raleigh	United States	PNC Arena	—	—
August 2, 2022	Washington, D.C.	United States	Capital One Arena	26,709 / 26,709	$3,338,625
August 3, 2022	Washington, D.C.	United States	Capital One Arena	26,709 / 26,709	$3,338,625
August 8, 2022	New York City	United States	Madison Square Garden	68,659 / 68,659	$8,170,421
August 9, 2022	New York City	United States	Madison Square Garden	68,659 / 68,659	$8,170,421
August 11, 2022	New York City	United States	Madison Square Garden	68,659 / 68,659	$8,170,421
August 12, 2022	New York City	United States	Madison Square Garden	68,659 / 68,659	$8,170,421
August 14, 2022	New York City	United States	Madison Square Garden	68,659 / 68,659	$8,170,421

== Cancelled dates ==
Date	City	Country	Venue	Reason
April 10, 2020 (Note: The concerts on April 10 and 17, 2020 in Indio were part of the Coachella Valley Music and Arts Festival.)	Indio	United States	Empire Polo Club	COVID-19 pandemic
April 17, 2020	Indio	United States	Empire Polo Club	COVID-19 pandemic
May 23, 2020 (Note: The concert on May 23, 2020, in Boston was part of the Boston Calling Music Festival.)	Boston	United States	Harvard Stadium	COVID-19 pandemic
June 19, 2020 (Note: The concert on June 19, 2020, in Dover was part of the Firefly Music Festival.)	Dover	United States	Dover International Speedway	COVID-19 pandemic
September 4, 2020 (Note: The concert on September 4, 2020, in Stradbally was part of Electric Picnic.)	Stradbally	Ireland	Stradbally Hall	COVID-19 pandemic
September 6, 2020 (Note: The concert on September 6, 2020, in Berlin was part of Lollapalooza Berlin.)	Berlin	Germany	Olympiapark Berlin	COVID-19 pandemic
August 24, 2022	Edinburgh	Scotland	Royal Highland Centre	Zack de la Rocha's leg injury
August 26, 2022 (Note: part of Leeds Festival.)	Leeds	England	Bramham Park	Zack de la Rocha's leg injury
August 28, 2022 (Note: part of Reading Festival.)	Reading	England	Little John's Farm	Zack de la Rocha's leg injury
August 30, 2022 (Note: part of Rock en Seine.)	Paris	France	Parc de Saint-Cloud	Zack de la Rocha's leg injury
September 1, 2022	Antwerp	Belgium	Sportpaleis	Zack de la Rocha's leg injury
September 3, 2022 (Note: Part of Die Mega 90er & 2000er Open Air Party.)	Hanover	Germany	Expo Plaza	Zack de la Rocha's leg injury
September 5, 2022	Zürich	Switzerland	Hallenstadion	Zack de la Rocha's leg injury
September 8, 2022 (Note: Part of Andalucía Big Festival.)	Málaga	Spain	Sacaba Beach	Zack de la Rocha's leg injury
September 10, 2022 (Note: Part of Mad Cool.)	Madrid	Spain	Valdebebas	Zack de la Rocha's leg injury
September 13, 2022	Vienna	Austria	Wiener Stadthalle	Zack de la Rocha's leg injury
September 15, 2022	Kraków	Poland	Tauron Arena	Zack de la Rocha's leg injury
September 17, 2022	Zagreb	Croatia	Arena Zagreb	Zack de la Rocha's leg injury
September 19, 2022	Prague	Czech Republic	O_{2} Arena	Zack de la Rocha's leg injury
February 22, 2023	Las Cruces	United States	Pan American Center	Zack de la Rocha's leg injury
February 24, 2023	El Paso	United States	Don Haskins Center	Zack de la Rocha's leg injury
February 26, 2023	Glendale	United States	Desert Diamond Arena	Zack de la Rocha's leg injury
February 28, 2023	Glendale	United States	Desert Diamond Arena	Zack de la Rocha's leg injury
March 3, 2023	Oakland	United States	Oakland Arena	Zack de la Rocha's leg injury
March 5, 2023	Oakland	United States	Oakland Arena	Zack de la Rocha's leg injury
March 7, 2023	Portland	United States	Moda Center	Zack de la Rocha's leg injury
March 9, 2023	Tacoma	United States	Tacoma Dome	Zack de la Rocha's leg injury
March 11, 2023	Vancouver	Canada	Pacific Coliseum	Zack de la Rocha's leg injury
March 13, 2023	Calgary	Canada	Scotiabank Saddledome	Zack de la Rocha's leg injury
March 15, 2023	Edmonton	Canada	Rogers Place	Zack de la Rocha's leg injury
March 17, 2023	Winnipeg	Canada	Canada Life Centre	Zack de la Rocha's leg injury
March 19, 2023	Minneapolis	United States	Target Center	Zack de la Rocha's leg injury
March 20, 2023	Minneapolis	United States	Target Center	Zack de la Rocha's leg injury
March 22, 2023	Sioux Falls	United States	Denny Sanford Premier Center	Zack de la Rocha's leg injury
March 28, 2023	Kansas City	United States	T-Mobile Center	Zack de la Rocha's leg injury
March 30, 2023	St. Louis	United States	Enterprise Center	Zack de la Rocha's leg injury
April 1, 2023	Detroit	United States	Little Caesars Arena	Zack de la Rocha's leg injury
April 2, 2023	Detroit	United States	Little Caesars Arena	Zack de la Rocha's leg injury
