= Live at the Grand Olympic Auditorium =

Live album by Rage Against the Machine

Live album by Rage Against the Machine
- Released: November 25, 2003
- Recorded: September 12–13, 2000
- Venues: Grand Olympic Auditorium, Los Angeles, California
- Genre: Rap metal
- Length: 71:09
- Label: Epic
- Producer: Rick Rubin

Rage Against the Machine chronology
Renegades (2000)	Live at the Grand Olympic Auditorium (2003)

Live at the Grand Olympic Auditorium is the second live album by the American rock band Rage Against the Machine, released on November 25, 2003, by Epic Records. It is a recording of two shows Rage played at the Grand Olympic Auditorium in their hometown of Los Angeles on September 12 and 13, 2000. The album was originally planned to be released in November 2000, but was delayed due to the break-up of the band shortly after the September concerts. It was then slated for release a year later, but was again delayed due to the formation of Audioslave by the remaining three members of Rage (Tom Morello, Tim Commerford and Brad Wilk) with vocalist Chris Cornell. The album was released amid mixed reviews in November 2003, mainly due to poor mixing rather than musical performance, where on the other hand the DVD version was praised by fans and critics alike.

Professional ratings
Review scores
Source	Rating
AllMusic	2.5/5 stars
Entertainment Weekly	A−
Now	2/5 Ns
Punknews.org	link
Spin	A−

== Track listing ==
All tracks are written by Rage Against the Machine, except where noted.

No.	Title	Writer(s)	Length
1.	"Bulls on Parade"		5:17
2.	"Bullet in the Head"		5:29
3.	"Born of a Broken Man"		4:20
4.	"Killing in the Name"		5:03
5.	"Calm Like a Bomb"		4:50
6.	"Testify"		3:22
7.	"Bombtrack"		4:06
8.	"War Within a Breath"		3:22
9.	"I'm Housin'"	Parrish Smith; Erick Sermon	4:47
10.	"Sleep Now in the Fire"		4:11
11.	"People of the Sun"		2:27
12.	"Guerrilla Radio"		3:54
13.	"Kick Out the Jams"	Michael Davis; Wayne Kramer; Fred "Sonic" Smith; Dennis Thompson; Rob Tyner	3:21
14.	"Know Your Enemy"		5:18
15.	"No Shelter"		3:59
16.	"Freedom"		7:05

Japan Bonus tracks
No.	Title	Writer(s)	Length
17.	"Microphone Fiend"	Eric Barrier; Rakim Allah	5:04
18.	"Beautiful World"	Gerald Casale; Mark Mothersbaugh	2:47

== DVD release ==
Live at the Grand Olympic Auditorium

Video by Rage Against the Machine
- Released: December 9, 2003
- Recorded: September 13, 2000
- Venue: Grand Olympic Auditorium (Los Angeles)
- Genre: Rap metal
- Length: 123:00
- Label: Epic
- Director: Jeff Richter
- Producer: Chris Palladino

Rage Against the Machine chronology
The Battle of Mexico City (2001)	Live at the Grand Olympic Auditorium (2003)	Live at Finsbury Park (2015)

Live at the Grand Olympic Auditorium was also released on DVD on December 9, 2003, two weeks after the CD release. The track listing varies from the CD and some tracks are recordings of the opposite night.

=== Track listing ===
1. "Bulls on Parade"
2. "Bombtrack"
3. "Calm Like a Bomb"
4. "Bullet in the Head"
5. "Sleep Now in the Fire"
6. "War Within a Breath"
7. "I'm Housin'"
8. "Killing in the Name"
9. "Born of a Broken Man"
10. "No Shelter"
11. "Guerrilla Radio"
12. "How I Could Just Kill a Man"
13. "Kick Out the Jams"
14. "Testify"
15. "Freedom"
- "Beautiful World" was included as well in the Japanese release of the DVD.

=== Bonus material ===
- "People of the Sun" and "Know Your Enemy"
- 2000 Democratic National Convention performance, featuring:
1. "Bulls on Parade"
2. "Testify"
3. "Guerrilla Radio"
4. "Sleep Now in the Fire"
5. "Freedom"
6. "Killing In The Name"
- Video clips for "How I Could Just Kill a Man" and "Bombtrack"

== Personnel ==
- Zack de la Rocha – vocals
- Tim Commerford – bass
- Brad Wilk – drums
- Tom Morello – guitar
- Rick Rubin – CD producer
- Rich Costey – CD mixer
- Jeff Richter – DVD director
- Chris Palladino – DVD producer
- Aimee Macauley – art director

== Charts ==
Chart performance for Live at the Grand Olympic Auditorium
Chart (2003)	Peak position
Australian Albums (ARIA)	69
Canadian Albums (Nielsen Soundscan)	70
French Albums (SNEP)	101
New Zealand Albums (RMNZ)	34
US Billboard 200	94

== Certifications ==
Certifications for Live at the Grand Olympic Auditorium
Region	Certification	Certified units/sales
Australia (ARIA)	Platinum	70,000^{^}
^{^} Shipments figures based on certification alone.
