= The Battle of Mexico City =

The Battle for Mexico City

Video by Rage Against the Machine
- Released: February 20, 2001
- Recorded: October 28, 1999
- Venue: Palacio de los Deportes (Mexico City)
- Genre: Rap metal
- Length: 68:00
- Label: Sony

Rage Against the Machine chronology
Rage Against the Machine (1997)	The Battle for Mexico City (2001)	Live at the Grand Olympic Auditorium (2003)

The Battle of Mexico City is the second video release by American rock band Rage Against the Machine. The concert was recorded at Palacio de los Deportes in Mexico City on October 28, 1999 as part of their The Battle of Los Angeles Tour. The concert was the band's first in Mexico City, which was chosen as the band had been longtime supporters of various political causes in Mexico.

The VHS was released in 2001 and later released on DVD in 2001, including a one-on-one interview with Noam Chomsky and a message from Subcomandante Marcos.

On July 21, 2020, it was released on vinyl as a Record Store Day exclusive, and it was released for streaming services on October 29.

== DVD track listing ==
1. Program start – 0:25
2. "Testify" – 4:00
3. "Guerrilla Radio" – 3:30
4. Documentary part I – 1:48
5. "People of the Sun" – 2:28
6. Documentary part II – 0:39
7. "Calm Like a Bomb" – 4:41
8. Documentary part III – 1:02
9. "Sleep Now in the Fire" – 3:33
10. "Born of a Broken Man" – 4:30
11. "Bombtrack" – 4:03
12. "Know Your Enemy" – 4:54
13. Documentary part IV – 1:00
14. "No Shelter" – 3:56
15. "War Within a Breath" – 3:27
16. Documentary part V – 2:14
17. "Bulls on Parade" – 3:55
18. "Killing in the Name" – 5:10
19. "Zapata's Blood" – 3:20
20. "Freedom" – 8:42
21. "Outro" – 1:10
- "Bullet in the Head" was also performed, but was removed from the official release due to a mistake made by Tom Morello during his solo.

Bonus

1. "Interview with Noam Chomsky" – 11:41
2. "Interview with Marcos" – 9:25
3. "Pre-Show Segment" – 3:08
4. "Tom Morello's Tour of Mexico City" – 1:53
