= Live & Rare (Rage Against the Machine album) =

Live album and compilation album by Rage Against the Machine
- Released: June 30, 1998
- Recorded: 1991–1997
- Genre: Rap metal
- Length: 59:59
- Label: Sony Music Japan
- Producer: Rage Against the Machine

Rage Against the Machine chronology
Evil Empire (1996)	Live & Rare (1998)	The Battle of Los Angeles (1999)

Live & Rare is the first live album and the first compilation of material by the American rock band Rage Against the Machine. Released on CD only in Japan on June 30, 1998 by Sony Music Japan, the album was only available overseas as an import. It comprises "official bootlegs" previously available on other singles as well as a pair of tracks from the band's 1991 demo. In 2018, the album was released on vinyl in the United States and Europe. The album was released digitally for the first time on July 14, 2022.

Professional ratings
Review scores
Source	Rating
AllMusic	2.5/5 stars

== Track listing ==
No.	Title	Length
1.	"Bullet in the Head" (live in Amsterdam, North Holland, Netherlands, February 7, 1993)	5:43
2.	"Settle for Nothing" (live in Amsterdam, North Holland, Netherlands, February 7, 1993)	4:57
3.	"Bombtrack" (live in Minneapolis, Minnesota, US, April 5, 1993)	5:53
4.	"Take the Power Back" (live in Vancouver, British Columbia, Canada, April 11, 1993)	6:11
5.	"Freedom" (live in Vancouver, British Columbia, Canada, April 11, 1993)	5:59
6.	"Black Steel in the Hour of Chaos" (Public Enemy cover) (featuring Chuck D of Public Enemy) (live at Radio 3FM in Hilversum, North Holland, Netherlands, May 27, 1996)	3:40
7.	"Zapata's Blood" (live at Radio 3FM in Hilversum, North Holland, Netherlands, May 27, 1996)	3:48
8.	"Without a Face" (live at Radio 3FM in Hilversum, North Holland, Netherlands, May 27, 1996)	4:05
9.	"Hadda Be Playing on the Jukebox" (Allen Ginsberg cover) (live in Detroit, Michigan, US, July 9, 1993)	8:02
10.	"Fuck tha Police" (N.W.A cover) (live in Washington, D.C., US, August 13, 1995)	4:07
11.	"Darkness"	3:42
12.	"Clear the Lane"	3:48

Filipino bonus track
No.	Title	Length
13.	"The Ghost of Tom Joad" (Bruce Springsteen cover)	5:41

Japanese re-issue bonus tracks
No.	Title	Length
13.	"The Ghost of Tom Joad" (Bruce Springsteen cover)	5:41
14.	"People of the Sun" (live at the Grand Olympic Auditorium in Los Angeles, California, US, September 13, 2000)	2:27
15.	"No Shelter" (live at the Grand Olympic Auditorium in Los Angeles, California, US, September 13, 2000)	3:59

Notes

- Tracks 11 & 12 from RATM Demo
- Track 14 & 15 from the Best Buy Bonus CD for Renegades (the same later released with Live at the Grand Olympic Auditorium)

== Personnel ==
- Tim Commerford – bass guitar, backing vocals
- Zack de la Rocha – lead vocals
- Tom Morello – guitar
- Brad Wilk – drums

== Certifications ==
Region	Certification	Certified units/sales
Japan (RIAJ)	Gold	100,000^{^}
^{^} Shipments figures based on certification alone.
