= 2000 Democratic National Convention protest activity =

Protests occurring in Los Angeles in August 2000

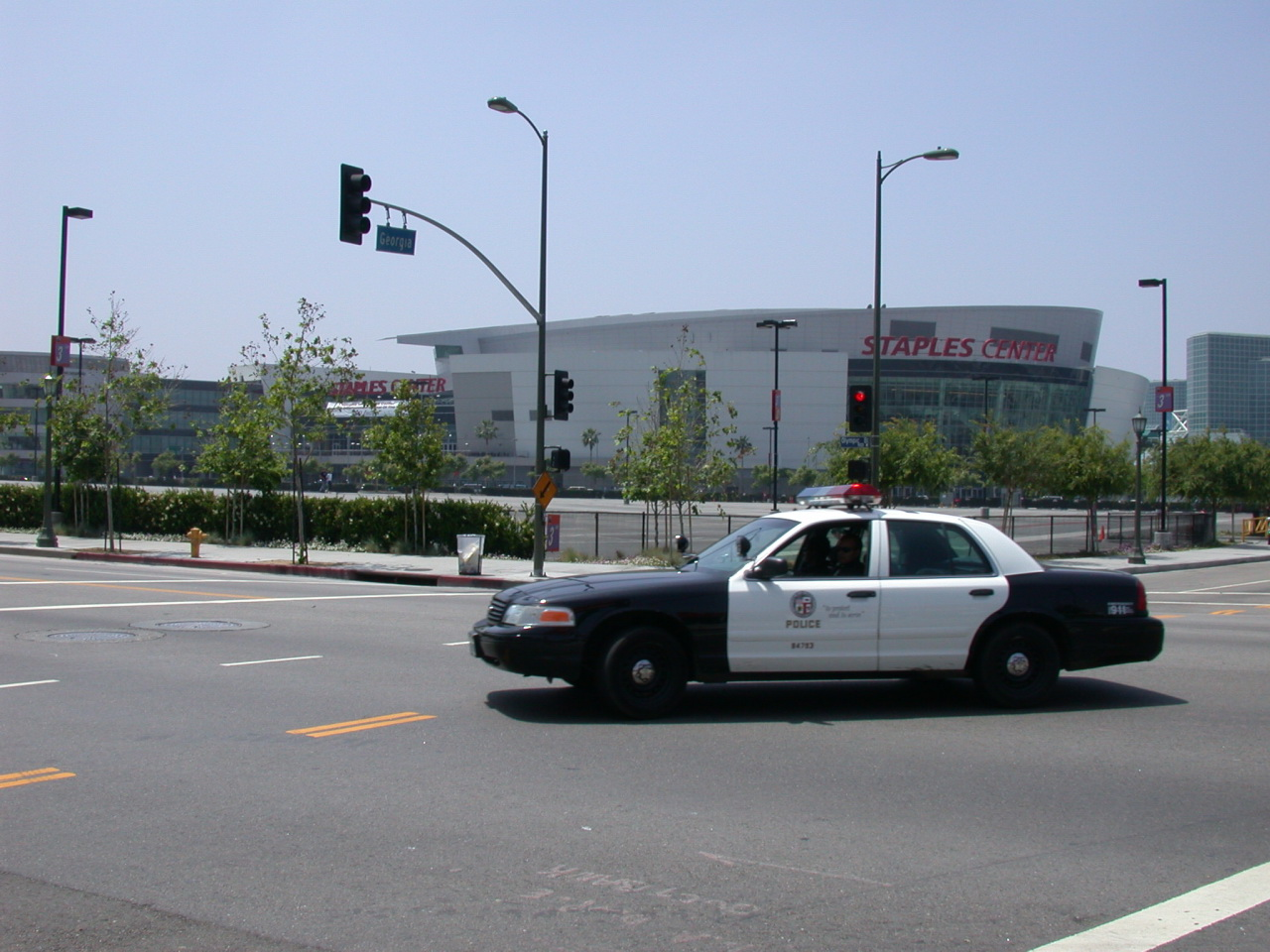
Staples Center in 2002

Protests surrounding the 2000 Democratic National Convention occurred from August 14 to August 17, 2000, around the Staples Center in downtown Los Angeles.

== Lakers' victory riot ==
Downtown Los Angeles saw rioting two months prior to the 2000 Democratic National Convention, when the Los Angeles Lakers won the 1999–2000 NBA season championship. The Lakers were in their inaugural year playing in the Staples Center (now Crypto.com Arena) downtown. On June 19, 2000, the Lakers beat the visiting Indiana Pacers, winning their first championship in twelve years. Thousands had gathered to watch the final game on a large screen outside the arena, in addition to thousands of fans inside.

As soon as the game ended, the crowd of nearly 10,000 people quickly turned violent, as some began attacking property, making bonfires, beating up a Lincoln limo and two LAPD cars, flipping a news van, and setting fire to a Ford Explorer, as well as looting local businesses. All the local media channels covered the riots live on television, where LAPD officers were seen containing the rioters, but taking some time before actively dispersing the crowd. Some criticized the LAPD for not taking a harder approach to the rioters. Part of what influenced the LAPD's hands-off approach was the recent Rampart Scandal that had rocked the department and generated much criticism in the news.

After the handling of the Lakers' victory riot, the LAPD revised its plan for the 2000 Democratic National Convention, which took place less than two months later.

== Birth of the Independent Media Center ==
The 2000 DNC brought about the birth of the Los Angeles media center for Independent Media Center (IMC) (also known as Indymedia.org). It became the fastest independent media collective to go from inspiration, after clashes between police, protesters and indie journalists at the November 1999 World Trade Organization WTO summit in Seattle, to having live satellite transmission capabilities and a bona-fide, official entity.

A multi-ethnic technical group composed of indie Hollywood filmmakers, MAPA members worked for several months in the technical planning and deployment of a media center. Indy-media leased the Patriotic Hall, converting the entire building to a giant media studio within 24 hours of taking possession of the premises on August 12. It was outfitted with film production equipment like diesel power generators, power distribution networks, and stage lighting within a few months. The entire lobby became a public forum with several podiums and large-screen televisions while technical and production crews managed the live media in several upper floors. Dozens of field reporters delivered media to a triage stage and moved on to editing crews composed of teenage nerds to Hollywood indie filmmakers.

Political and media luminaries were present including Amy Goodman, broadcasting her daily radio show Democracy Now!. This event marked also the Beginning of TV/satellite broadcast of Democracy Now! utilizing the Indymedia Studio—and other social activists like Arianna Huffington, Gore Vidal, Christopher Hitchens, and several political candidates including Peter Camejo, Kucinich, as well as pundits, and activists.

This independent media content was broadcast through DishNetwork and DirectTV via Freespeech TV available on both satellite television providers. On Monday August 14, the LAPD, aided by the California Highway Patrol were sent to shut down the studio. However, no laws were violated and Indymedia.org had a valid lease from the County. The LAPD released the building to the tenants.

The following day, IMC resumed media broadcast activities, due to the quick intervention of the National Lawyers Guild which oversaw the entire DNC activities in order to provide eye-witness accounts to ensure the prevention of police abuse and to ensure a democratic process. National Lawyers Guild members identified themselves with bright green, fluorescent, ball-caps emblazoned with their name and carrying legal pads. Progressive supporters like Ben and Jerry ice cream,(a sister company of Breyers) provided thousands of dollars in free product to the Indymedia project with a continuously-resupplied truck in the Patriotic Hall parking lot. This event became known as the DNC-2000 "Shadow Convention".

== Anarchists' activities ==
In addition to the anarchist participation in the protests of the DNC, a group of anarchists, calling themselves the "August Collective", held the North American Anarchist Conference, a three-day conference in the days before the DNC took place. The conference was a convergence of hundreds of anarchists both from North America and abroad, and consisted of workshops, panels, speaking engagements and various other events. The recommended $25 donation granted access to the events for three days, as well as free housing (attendees slept on the floor in the warehouse that hosted the conference) and free meals provided by Food Not Bombs.

Due to the local media and LAPD-induced "Black Scare", the organizers of the event took special security measures during preparations. For instance, attendees of the conference had to "check-in" at a local vegetarian cafe called Luna Tierra Sol to get the address of the conference warehouse (a large orange building next to LA River that usually held "Raves"). The motive behind this decision was fear that if the LAPD knew the location of the conference, they would pressure the owner to cancel the rental of the building. In addition to this, the actual location of the building was withheld from everyone except the two August Collective members who secured the space. Despite this, the LAPD reportedly installed a video surveillance system on a nearby lamppost days before the conference, and removed it after the DNC had ended.

Despite fear that the LAPD would raid the conference and shut it down, the conference went ahead as scheduled, and other than undercover surveillance, police presence was kept to a minimum. Among other things, many members and attendees suspected that the police would pressure the fire department to deem the nature of sleeping attendees as a fire hazard. However, nothing came of such suspicions.

== Protest zone ==
In order to provide security around the Staples Center, the Los Angeles Convention Center, the LAPD, Los Angeles Fire Department and United States Secret Service designed a large secure zone for the news outlets and media and surrounded by a perimeter fence consisting of K-rail barriers with a 10-foot fence rising up from it. The proposed layout of the "Media Village" had been diagrammed and published by the Los Angeles Times.

The initial planned location of the convention's free speech zone was successfully challenged in court for being too remote. The zone was consequentially relocated to a parking lot across from the Staples Center.

== Rage Against the Machine concert ==
In the months leading up to the convention, cable channel MTV began planning a large, free concert to take place in downtown Los Angeles as a part of its "Choose or Lose" campaign aimed at getting youth out to vote. MTV decided that popular rock group Rage Against the Machine would be the ideal marquee band. However, the band's political message, combined with the title of its most recent album, The Battle of Los Angeles, caused serious concerns from LA city leaders. MTV's applications for staging the concert were denied by the city and the channel eventually gave up its attempts to plan one. After MTV's attempts failed, a number of protest groups agreed to give their one-hour time allotments on the stage in the Protest Zone. The band was offered prime time slots coinciding with the marquee speaker on the opening night of the convention, then-President Bill Clinton.

Although they were at first required by the City of Los Angeles to perform in a small venue at a considerable distance, early in August a United States district court judge ruled that the city's request was too restrictive and the City subsequently allowed the protests and concert to be held at a site across from the DNC. The police response was to increase security measures, which included a 12' fence and patrolling by a minimum of 2,000 officers wearing riot gear, as well as additional horses, motorcycles, squad cars and police helicopters. A police spokesperson said they were "gravely concerned because of security reasons".

During the concert, the band's front-man Zack de la Rocha said to the crowd, "brothers and sisters, our democracy has been hijacked," and later shouted "we have a right to oppose these motherfuckers!" After the performance, a small group of attendees congregated at the point in the protest area closest to the DNC, facing the police officers. Reports of what activity they engaged in vary, the most extreme being reports of throwing glass, concrete and water bottles filled with "noxious agents," spraying ammonia on police and sling-shooting rocks and steel balls. However, milder reports also arose, one only mentioning "tossing rocks." The police soon after declared the gathering an unlawful assembly, switch off the electrical supply, interrupting performing band Ozomatli, and informed the protesters that they had 15 minutes to disperse on pain of arrest. Some of the protesters remained, however, including two young men who climbed the fence and waved black flags, who were subsequently shot in the face with pepper spray. Police then forcibly dispersed the crowd, using tear gas, pepper spray and rubber bullets. At least six people were arrested in the incident.

The police faced severe and broad criticism for their reaction, with an American Civil Liberties Union spokesperson saying that it was "nothing less than an orchestrated police riot." Several primary witnesses reported unnecessarily violent actions and police abuses, including firing on reporters, lawyers and people obeying police commands. Protesters were trapped between police fronts and some were beaten by police while trying to obey commands. At one point, four young men were repeatedly beaten by mounted police while trapped against a wall. Police responded that their response was "outstanding" and "clearly disciplined."

Footage of the protest and ensuing violence, along with an MTV News report on the incident, was included in the Live at the Grand Olympic Auditorium DVD.
