= Live at Finsbury Park =

2015 film

- Starring: Zack de la Rocha; Tom Morello; Tim Commerford; Brad Wilk
- Music by: Rage Against the Machine
- Release date: 16 October 2015
- Running time: 69 min
- Language: English

Live at Finsbury Park is a video album by the American rock band Rage Against the Machine. The concert was recorded on 6 June 2010 at Finsbury Park in London. The concert was held in celebration of a successful campaign which propelled Killing in the Name into the Christmas number one spot on the UK Singles Chart in December 2009, beating out that year's The X Factor winner for the first time since 2005.

== Track listing ==
1. "Testify"
2. "Bombtrack"
3. "People of the Sun"
4. "Know Your Enemy"
5. "Bulls on Parade"
6. "Township Rebellion"
7. "Bullet in the Head"
8. "White Riot" (The Clash cover)
9. "Guerrilla Radio"
10. "Sleep Now in the Fire"
11. "Freedom"
12. "Killing in the Name"

== Release ==
The video was released on DVD and Blu-ray formats on 16 October 2015 on Eagle Vision.
