= Without a Face =

1996 song by Rage Against the Machine

Song by Rage Against the Machine

from the album Evil Empire
- Released: April 16, 1996
- Genre: Rap metal
- Length: 3:36
- Label: Epic
- Songwriter(s): Zack de la Rocha
- Producer(s): Brendan O'Brien, Rage Against the Machine

"Without a Face" is a song by American rap metal band Rage Against the Machine from their second studio album Evil Empire (1996).

== Background ==
"Without a Face" discusses the hardships faced by Mexican immigrants when moving to the United States, and how the U.S. government was building a wall at the border between itself and Mexico to stop the immigrants coming in.

It seems as if [as] soon as the wall in Germany fell, that the U.S. government was busy building another one on the border between the U.S. and Mexico. Since 1986, as a result of a lot of the hate talk and hysteria that the government of the United States has been speaking, 1500 bodies have been found on the border. We wrote this song in response to it. – Zack de la Rocha, Live & Rare (1996)

The title references the fact that many Mexican immigrants in the U.S. go unnoticed: they don't have signs on their backs, identification or rights, and are treated as one mass of nameless people. As such, they can be thought of as "without a face". The chorus (Walk unseen past the graves and the gates / Born without a face / One motive, no hope, uh / Born without a face) refers to the Zapatista people of Chiapas, who were unrepresented and ignored by the Institutional Revolutionary Party (PRI) controlled Mexican government, but also broadly to other peoples hurt by the North American Free Trade Agreement (NAFTA).

Given the crisis and the Free Trade Agreement, the people of the United States also feel like people 'without a face'; that is, with no alternatives, without possibilities. Dialogue and the importance of the place given to us by the Zapatistas made us feel that we were a part of the Zapatista struggle, because we are students, workers, artists… and many of us are Mexican. – Zack de la Rocha, interview with Jesus Ramirez Cuevas (1998).
