= Rage Against the Machine (video) =

Video by Rage Against the Machine
- Released: November 25, 1997
- Recorded: 1992–1996
- Genre: Rap metal
- Length: 80:00
- Label: Sony

Rage Against the Machine chronology
Rage Against the Machine (1997)	The Battle of Mexico City (2001)

Rage Against the Machine (also known as Rage Against the Machine: The Video) is the official self-titled debut video release by American rock band Rage Against the Machine. The video was released in 1997 and includes footage from various performances as well as video clips.

== Background ==
Towards the end of their Summer 1997 Evil Empire tour, the band decided to put together a video, as they had a huge backlog of live performance recordings. They taped the last two shows of the tour, then added live material from 1994, 1996, and all the music videos up through "People of the Sun."

== Reception ==
AllMusic writer JT Griffith wrote "Overall, the quality of the video is fine, but the music mix is low and a bit muddy." Tom Sinclair of Entertainment Weekly gave the video a B writing "Armchair headbangers rejoice: This concert tape of American and European dates (with all of Rage Against the Machine's videos appended) lets you experience RATM's galvanic rap-metal fusion without suffering the indignities of a mosh pit."

== Track listing ==
Live in Concert

1. "Intro" – 0:09
2. "The Ghost of Tom Joad" – 5:13
3. "Vietnow" – 4:49
4. "People of the Sun" – 2:31
5. "Bulls on Parade" – 3:57
6. "Bullet in the Head" – 5:49
7. "Zapata's Blood" (short clip) – 1:45
8. "Know Your Enemy" – 5:21
9. "Bombtrack" – 4:09
10. "Tire Me" – 2:57
11. "Killing in the Name" – 13:04
12. "Outro" – 2:03

Uncensored Video Clips (Official Music Videos)

- "Killing in the Name" – 5:14
- "Bullet in the Head" – 4:49
- "Freedom" – 5:58
- "Bulls on Parade" – 3:52
- "Memory of the Dead/Land and Liberty" (poem recitation) – 3:43
- "People of the Sun" – 2:48

Song in Credits

- "Down Rodeo"
