= Godzilla: The Album =

1998 soundtrack album by various artists

Soundtrack album by Various artists
- Released: May 19, 1998
- Recorded: 1997–1998
- Genres: Rap rock; alternative rock
- Length: 59:04
- Labels: Epic; Sony
- Producers: David Arnold; Rob Cavallo; Mike Clink; Sean "Puffy" Combs; Foo Fighters; Fuzzbubble; Green Day; Jay Kay; Nick Launay; Scott Litt; Brendan O'Brien; Rage Against the Machine; Andrew Slater

Singles from Godzilla: The Album
- 1. "Come with Me" Released: May 18, 1998; 2. "No Shelter" Released: May 19, 1998; 3. "Deeper Underground" Released: May 20, 1998 (Japan); 4. "Shinshoku (Lose Control)" Released: July 8, 1998 (Japan)

Professional ratings
Review scores
Source	Rating
Allmusic	2.5/5 stars

Godzilla: The Album is the soundtrack to the 1998 film Godzilla. It was released on May 19, 1998, through Epic Records and mainly consists of rap rock and alternative rock songs.

== Singles ==
The album's most successful single was Puff Daddy and Jimmy Page's "Come with Me" which peaked at No. 4 on the Billboard Hot 100 and was certified platinum. The single sold a certified 2.025 million copies worldwide.

Other hit singles included Jamiroquai's "Deeper Underground", the band's only No. 1 on the UK Singles Chart, and The Wallflowers' cover of "Heroes", which peaked at number 10 on the Billboard Modern Rock Tracks chart in 1998.

A notable entry is "No Shelter" by Rage Against the Machine, in which a line in the lyrics of the song appears to criticize the film for distracting the public, saying, "Godzilla, pure motherfucking filler. Get your eyes off the real killer."

== Commercial performance and critical reception ==
The soundtrack debuted at number two on the Billboard 200, being blocked from number one by DMX's debut album, It's Dark and Hell Is Hot. The album was commercially successful, being certified platinum in the United States, Japan, and New Zealand; gold in Australia, and 3× platinum in Canada.

By July 1998, the album sold 2.5 million copies worldwide. It was #56 on the Billboard chart of 1998's best-selling albums, having sold 1.3 million copies in the United States by the end of 1998.

== Track listing ==
Godzilla: The Album – North America and Europe edition
No.	Title	Writer(s)	Producer(s)	Length
1.	"Heroes" (The Wallflowers)	David Bowie; Brian Eno	Andrew Slater	3:56
2.	"Come with Me" (Puff Daddy featuring Jimmy Page)	Jimmy Page; Robert Plant; John Bonham; Sean Combs; Mark Curry	Sean "Puffy" Combs	6:06
3.	"Deeper Underground" (Jamiroquai)	Jay Kay; Toby Smith	Jay Kay	4:42
4.	"No Shelter" (Rage Against the Machine)	Rage Against the Machine; Zack de la Rocha	Brendan O'Brien; Rage Against the Machine (co.)	4:03
5.	"Air" (Ben Folds Five)	Ben Folds; Darren Jessee; Robert Sledge	Brendan O'Brien	3:20
6.	"Running Knees" (Days of the New)	Travis Meeks	Scott Litt	3:41
7.	"Macy Day Parade" (Michael Penn)	Michael Penn	Brendan O'Brien	4:18
8.	"Walk the Sky" (Fuel)	Carl Bell	Brendan O'Brien	3:17
9.	"A320" (Foo Fighters)	Foo Fighters	Foo Fighters	5:44
10.	"Brain Stew (The Godzilla Remix)" (Green Day)	Billie Joe Armstrong; Green Day	Rob Cavallo; Green Day	3:57
11.	"Untitled" (Silverchair)	Daniel Johns; Ben Gillies	Nick Launay	3:31
12.	"Out There" (Fuzzbubble)	Jim Bacchi; Mark DiCarlo	Mike Clink; Fuzzbubble	2:48
13.	"Undercover" (Joey DeLuxe)	Joey DeLuxe	David Arnold	5:11
14.	"Opening Titles" (David Arnold)	David Arnold	David Arnold	2:42
15.	"Looking for Clues" (David Arnold)	David Arnold	David Arnold	1:48
Total length:				59:04

The Japanese, Taiwanese and Asian edition featured an additional track:

Godzilla: The Album – Japanese, Taiwanese and Asian edition
No.	Title	Writer(s)	Producer(s)	Length
12.	"Shinshoku (Lose Control)" (L'Arc-en-Ciel)	Hideto "Hyde" Takarai	L'Arc-en-Ciel; Hajime Okano	4:45
Total length:				63:49

== Charts ==
Chart (1998)	Peak position
Australian Albums (ARIA)	8
Austrian Albums (Ö3 Austria)	4
Belgian Albums (Ultratop Flanders)	25
Belgian Albums (Ultratop Wallonia)	22
Canada Top Albums/CDs (RPM)	2
Dutch Albums (Album Top 100)	52
French Albums (SNEP)	27
German Albums (Offizielle Top 100)	12
Hungarian Albums (MAHASZ)	10
New Zealand Albums (RMNZ)	4
Swedish Albums (Sverigetopplistan)	38
Swiss Albums (Schweizer Hitparade)	15
UK Compilation Albums (Official Charts)	13
US Billboard 200	2

== Certifications and sales ==
Region	Certification	Certified units/sales
Australia (ARIA)	Gold	35,000^{^}
Canada (Music Canada)	3× Platinum	300,000^{^}
Japan (RIAJ)	Platinum	200,000^{^}
New Zealand (RMNZ)	Platinum	15,000^{^}
Singapore	—	9,000
United States (RIAA)	Platinum	1,300,000
Summaries
Worldwide	—	2,500,000
^{^} Shipments figures based on certification alone.
