= Renegades (Rage Against the Machine album) =

Studio album of cover versions by Rage Against the Machine
- Released: December 5, 2000
- Studios: Cello (Hollywood); The Village (Los Angeles)
- Genres: Rap rock; rap metal; nu metal
- Length: 51:14
- Label: Epic
- Producers: Rick Rubin; Brendan O'Brien; Rage Against the Machine

Rage Against the Machine chronology
The Battle of Los Angeles (1999)	Renegades (2000)	Live at the Grand Olympic Auditorium (2003)

Singles from Renegades
- 1. "Renegades of Funk" Released: February 20, 2001

Renegades is the fourth and final studio album by the American rock band Rage Against the Machine, released on December 5, 2000, by Epic Records. It consists of covers of songs by Bruce Springsteen, Bob Dylan, Afrika Bambaataa, Minor Threat, Eric B. & Rakim, the Stooges, MC5, the Rolling Stones, Cypress Hill, Devo and others. The cover is a take on Robert Indiana's Love artwork series.

Unlike other Rage Against the Machine albums, Renegades was not accompanied by a supporting tour due to the band splitting up almost two months before its release. It was certified platinum a little over a month after release. Shortly after the release, the band members, with the exception of lead vocalist Zack de la Rocha, formed a new band, Audioslave, with then-former Soundgarden vocalist Chris Cornell.

== Critical reception ==
Professional ratings
Aggregate scores
Source	Rating
Metacritic	78/100
Review scores
Source	Rating
AllMusic	4/5 stars
Alternative Press	4/5 stars
Entertainment Weekly	A−
Melodic	4.5/5 stars
Melody Maker	3.5/5 stars
Mojo	4/5 stars
NME	8/10
Q	3/5 stars
Rolling Stone	4/5 stars
Select	4/5 stars

According to the review aggregator Metacritic, Renegades received "generally favorable reviews" based on a weighted average score of 78 out of 100 from 15 critic scores. AllMusic critic John Bush wrote that the record "works well with just a bare few exceptions, in part because Rage Against the Machine is both smart enough to change very little and talented enough to make the songs its own." Alternative Press described the record as "a tour through three decades of sonic recalcitrance" and "the genome map of seditious sound". Entertainment Weekly's Rob Brunner described the record as "a remarkably diverse, if not exactly surprising, mix of heavy rock, hip-hop and protest music". He said it "would still be a raging success even if this disc does nothing but introduce a new generation to the joys of Bob Dylan and Minor Threat".

Mojo wrote: "This crisp, Rick Rubin-produced outing packs away a machine that was well-oiled to the last." Kitty Empire of NME labeled the record "a brilliant archaeology" and "a sonic history lesson". The Rolling Stone critic Tom Moon said the band executed "diverse tracks" such as Bruce Springsteen's "The Ghost of Tom Joad", the Rolling Stones' "Street Fighting Man", Afrika Bambaataa's "Renegades of Funk" and Bob Dylan's "Maggie's Farm" with "the roaring, fearless spirit that’s been missing in action since these songs were new", while Select regarded it as their "most satisfying record since their debut".

Renegades has appeared in lists ranking the best cover albums, including by The Independent in 2013 and NME in 2019.

== Track listing ==
Renegades track listing
No.	Title	Writer(s)	Original artist (date)	Length
1.	"Microphone Fiend"	Eric Barrier, Rakim Allah	Eric B. & Rakim (1988)	5:01
2.	"Pistol Grip Pump"	Roger Troutman, Dino Hawkins, Adrian Miller, Eric Vidal, Nick Vidal	Volume 10 (1994)	3:18
3.	"Kick Out the Jams"	Wayne Kramer, Fred "Sonic" Smith, Rob Tyner, Michael Davis, Dennis Thompson	MC5 (1969)	3:11
4.	"Renegades of Funk"	Lance Taylor, Arthur Baker, John Miller, John Robie	Afrika Bambaataa (1983)	4:35
5.	"Beautiful World"	Mark Mothersbaugh, Gerald Casale	Devo (1981)	2:35
6.	"I'm Housin'"	Erick Sermon, Parrish Smith	EPMD (1988)	4:56
7.	"In My Eyes"	Ian MacKaye, Jeff Nelson, Brian Baker, Lyle Preslar	Minor Threat (1981)	2:54
8.	"How I Could Just Kill a Man"	Louis Freese, Senen Reyes, Lawrence Muggerud	Cypress Hill (1991)	4:04
9.	"The Ghost of Tom Joad"	Bruce Springsteen	Bruce Springsteen (1995)	5:38
10.	"Down on the Street"	Iggy Pop, Ron Asheton, Scott Asheton, Dave Alexander	The Stooges (1970)	3:38
11.	"Street Fighting Man"	Mick Jagger, Keith Richards	The Rolling Stones (1968)	4:42
12.	"Maggie's Farm"	Bob Dylan	Bob Dylan (1965)	6:34
Total length:				51:14

== Personnel ==
- Rage Against the Machine – co-production, art direction
- Zack de la Rocha – lead vocals
- Tom Morello – guitars
- Tim Commerford – bass, backing vocals
- Brad Wilk – drums
- Sen Dog – vocals on the live version of "How I Could Just Kill a Man"
- B-Real – vocals on the live version of "How I Could Just Kill a Man"
- Rick Rubin – production
- Brendan O'Brien – production on "The Ghost of Tom Joad"
- Jim Scott – engineering
- David Schiffman – engineering
- Rich Costey – mixing
- D. Sardy – mixing on "The Ghost of Tom Joad" and "Street Fighting Man"
- Katie Teasdale – assistant engineering
- Darren Mora – assistant engineering
- Matt Marin – assistant engineering
- Mike Scotella – assistant engineering
- Geoof Walcha – assistant engineering
- Rich Veltrop – assistant engineering
- Greg Fidelman – digital editing
- Mark Moreau – digital editing
- Aimee Macauley – art direction
- Lindsay Chase – production coordination
- Jake Sexton – political coordination
- Jake Koppell – inside booklet

== Charts ==
=== Weekly charts ===
Weekly chart performance for Renegades
Chart (2000–2001)	Peak position
Australian Albums (ARIA)	10
Austrian Albums (Ö3 Austria)	66
Canadian Albums (Billboard)	13
Finnish Albums (Suomen virallinen lista)	25
German Albums (Offizielle Top 100)	47
Polish Albums (ZPAV)	33
Scottish Albums (Official Charts)	59
Swiss Albums (Schweizer Hitparade)	49
UK Albums (Official Charts)	71
US Billboard 200	14

=== Year-end charts ===
2000 year-end chart performance for Renegades
Chart (2000)	Position
Canadian Albums (Nielsen SoundScan)	157

2001 year-end chart performance for Renegades
Chart (2001)	Position
US Billboard 200	121

== Certifications ==
Certifications and sales for Renegades
Region	Certification	Certified units/sales
Australia (ARIA)	Platinum	70,000^{^}
New Zealand (RMNZ)	Gold	7,500^{‡}
United Kingdom (BPI)	Gold	100,000^{*}
United States (RIAA)	Platinum	1,000,000^{^}
^{*} Sales figures based on certification alone.^{^} Shipments figures based on certification alone.^{‡} Sales+streaming figures based on certification alone.
