= Rage Against the Machine =

American rock band

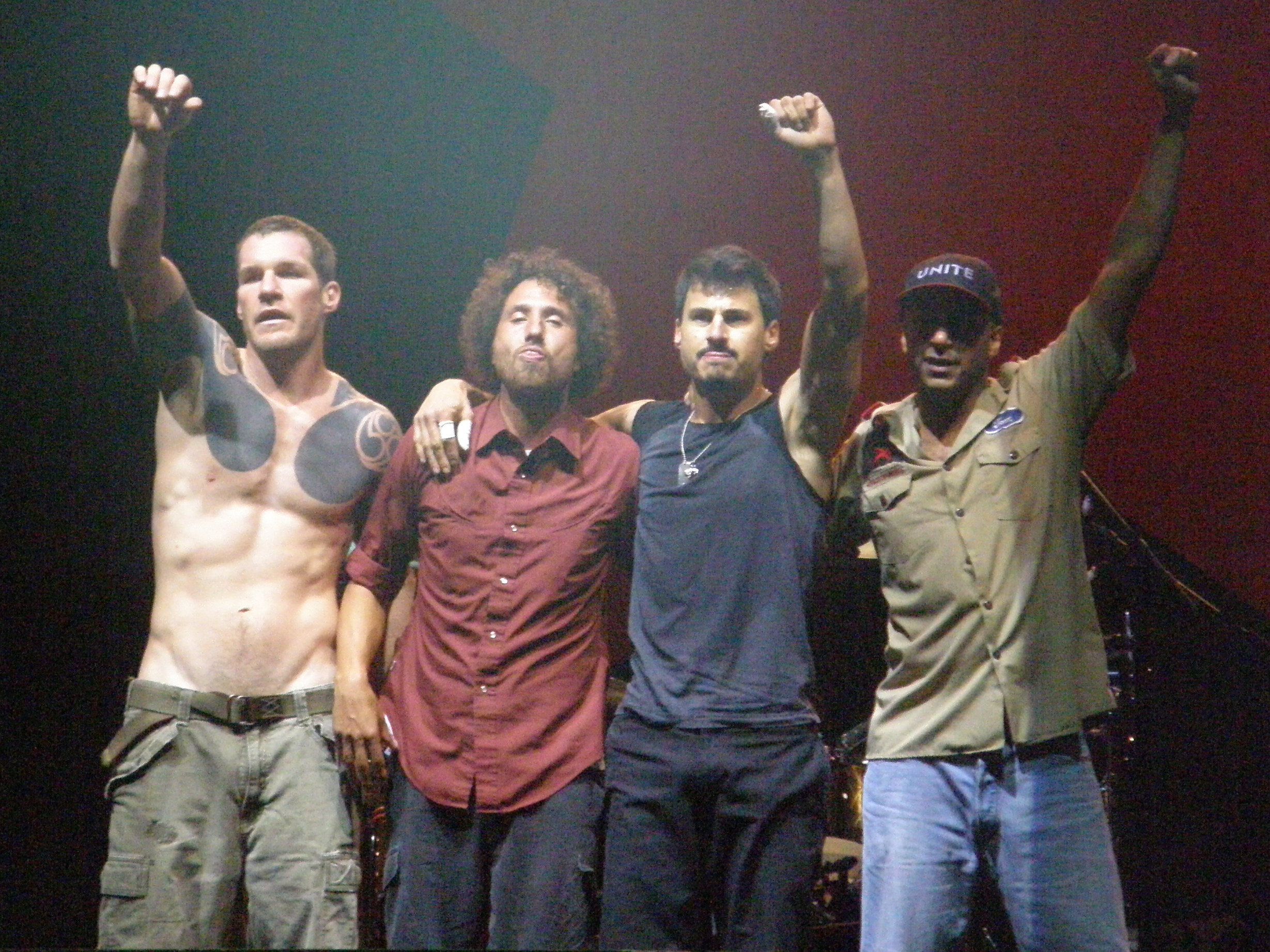
- Rage Against the Machine at Sam Boyd Stadium in 2007. From left: Tim Commerford, Zack de la Rocha, Brad Wilk, and Tom Morello

Background information
- Origin: Los Angeles, California, U.S.
- Genres: Rap metal; rap rock; funk metal; alternative metal
- Works: Discography; songs
- Years active: 1991–2000; 2007–2011; 2019–2024
- Labels: Epic; Revelation
- Spinoffs: Audioslave; One Day as a Lion; The Nightwatchman; Wakrat; Prophets of Rage
- Spinoff of: Lock Up; Inside Out
- Past members: Tim Commerford; Zack de la Rocha; Tom Morello; Brad Wilk
- Website: ratm.com
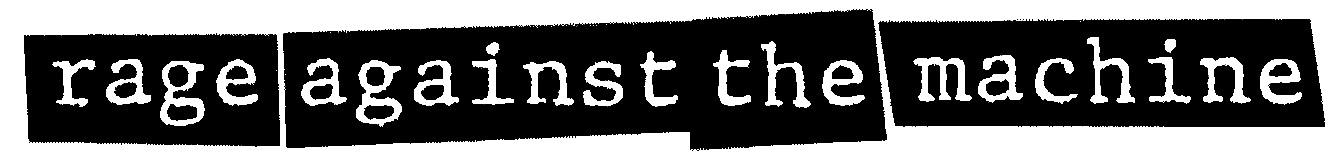

Rage Against the Machine (often abbreviated as RATM or shortened to Rage) was an American rock band formed in Los Angeles, California, in 1991. It consisted of Zack de la Rocha (vocals), Tim Commerford (bass), Tom Morello (guitar), and Brad Wilk (drums). They melded heavy metal, rap, punk rock, and funk with anti-authoritarian, anti-capitalist and revolutionary lyrics. As of 2010, they had sold more than 16 million records worldwide.

Rage Against the Machine released their self-titled debut album in 1992 to acclaim; in 2020, Rolling Stone ranked it number 221 on its list of the 500 greatest albums of all time. They achieved commercial success following their performances at the 1993 Lollapalooza festival. Their next albums, Evil Empire (1996) and The Battle of Los Angeles (1999), topped the Billboard 200 chart.

In 2000, Rage Against the Machine released the cover album Renegades. They disbanded in 2000 after de la Rocha quit, and the other members formed the band Audioslave with the singer Chris Cornell. After pursuing other projects, they reunited to perform at Coachella in 2007. Over the next four years, they played live venues and festivals around the world before going on hiatus in 2011. In 2022, Rage Against the Machine began the Public Service Announcement Tour. It was cut short after de la Rocha suffered a leg injury. Wilk confirmed in 2024 that the band had disbanded for the third time.

Rage Against the Machine became a popular and influential band, and influenced the nu metal genre which came to prominence during the late 1990s and early 2000s. They were also ranked No. 33 on VH1's 100 Greatest Artists of Hard Rock. They were inducted into the Rock and Roll Hall of Fame in 2023.

== History ==
=== 1991–1992: Early years ===
In 1991, following the break-up of guitarist Tom Morello's former band Lock Up, former Lock Up drummer Jon Knox encouraged Tim Commerford and Zack de la Rocha to jam with Morello as he was looking to start a new group. Morello soon contacted Brad Wilk, who had unsuccessfully auditioned for both Lock Up and the band that would later become Pearl Jam. This lineup named themselves Rage Against the Machine, after a song De la Rocha had written for his former underground hardcore punk band Inside Out (also to be the title of the unrecorded Inside Out full-length album). Kent McClard, a zine publisher who was associated with Inside Out, used the phrase "rage against the machine" in a 1989 article in his zine No Answers.

The blueprint for the group's major-label debut album and demo tape Rage Against the Machine was laid on a twelve-song self-released cassette, the cover image of which featured newspaper clippings of the stock market section with a single match taped to the inlay card. Not all 12 songs made it onto the final album—two were eventually included as B-sides, while three others never saw an official release. Several record labels expressed interest, and the band eventually signed with Epic Records. Morello said, "Epic agreed to everything we asked—and they've followed through ... We never saw an ideological conflict as long as we maintained creative control."

=== 1992–1994: Rage Against the Machine ===
"Know Your Enemy"
Sample of "Know Your Enemy" from the band's debut album (1992)

The band's debut album, Rage Against the Machine, was released in November 1992. The cover featured Malcolm Browne's Pulitzer Prize-winning photograph of Thích Quảng Đức, a Vietnamese Buddhist monk, burning himself to death in Saigon in 1963 in protest of the shooting of Buddhists by the regime of U.S.-backed prime minister Ngô Đình Diệm. The album was produced by Canadian record producer and music engineer Garth Richardson.

While sales were initially slow, the album became a critical and commercial success, driven by heavy radio airplay of the song "Killing in the Name", a heavy, driving track featuring only eight lines of lyrics. The "Fuck You" version, which contains 17 instances of the word fuck, was once accidentally played on the BBC Radio 1 Top 40 singles show on February 21, 1993.

The band's profile soared following a performance at the Lollapalooza festival in mid-1993 tour; sales of Rage Against the Machine in the United States increased from 75,000 before Lollapalooza, to 400,000 by the end of the year. The band also toured with Suicidal Tendencies in Europe, and House of Pain. By April 1996, Rage Against the Machine had sold over 1 million copies in the USand 3 million copies worldwide. It was certified triple platinum in the US in May 2000. It appears in every edition of Rolling Stone's 500 Greatest Albums of All Time list, with the most recent being in 2020 at its highest position, 221.

Rage Against the Machine appeared on the soundtrack for the 1995 film Higher Learning with the song "Year of tha Boomerang". An early version of "Tire Me" also appeared in the movie. Subsequently, they re-recorded the song "Darkness" from their original demo for the soundtrack of The Crow (1994), while "No Shelter" appeared on the Godzilla soundtrack in 1998.

=== 1995–2000: Mainstream success ===
"Different band members have their different interests that they've been pursuing. But principally, the main reason for the delay between records was trying to find the right combination of our very diverse influences that would make a record that we were all happy with and that was great. That was a long process."

— Tom Morello speaking to Kerrang! in 1996 about the delays between Rage Against the Machine and its follow-up, Evil Empire.

In late 1994, Rage Against the Machine took a hiatus from touring, sparking rumors that they had broken up. According to an anonymous source reporting to MTV News, Rage Against the Machine had recorded 23 tracks with producer Brendan O'Brien in Atlanta starting in November 1994, and briefly broke up due to violent infighting in the band, before regrouping for the KROQ Weenie Roast in June 1995. Morello later said there had been conflicts over their musical direction, which were reconciled.

The band eventually recorded their long-awaited follow-up album, Evil Empire, with O'Brien in November and December 1995. Morello said that, as a result of the band's musical tensions, the album incorporated greater hip-hop influences, describing its sound as a "middle ground between Public Enemy and the Clash".

Evil Empire was released on April 16, 1996, and entered the Billboard 200 chart at number one, selling 249,000 copies in its first week. It later rose to triple platinum status. Rage Against the Machine performed "Bulls on Parade" on Saturday Night Live in April 1996. Their planned two-song performance was cut to one song when the band attempted to hang inverted American flags from their amplifiers ("a sign of distress or great danger"), in protest of the program's guest host, Republican presidential candidate Steve Forbes.

In 1997, the band opened for U2 on the PopMart Tour. Their profits went to organizations such as the Union of Needletrades, Industrial and Textile Employees, Women Alive and the Zapatista Front for National Liberation. Rage began an abortive headlining U.S. tour with Wu-Tang Clan. Police in several jurisdictions unsuccessfully attempted to have the concerts canceled, citing, among other reasons, the band's "violent and anti-law enforcement philosophies". After Wu-Tang Clan failed to appear during a concert at Riverport, they were removed from the lineup and replaced with the Roots. Sony Records released Live & Rare, compiling B-sides and live performances, in Japan in June 1998. A live video, Rage Against the Machine, was released later the same year.

In 1999, Rage Against the Machine played at the Woodstock '99 concert. Their third album, The Battle of Los Angeles, debuted at number one in 1999, selling 450,000 copies in the first week and was certified double-platinum. That year, the song "Wake Up" was featured on the soundtrack of the film The Matrix. The track "Calm Like a Bomb" was used in the sequel, The Matrix Reloaded (2003). In 2000, the band planned to support the Beastie Boys on the "Rhyme and Reason" tour, but the tour was cancelled when the Beastie Boys drummer, Mike D, suffered a serious injury. In 2003, The Battle of Los Angeles was ranked number 426 on Rolling Stone's 500 Greatest Albums of All Time.

=== 2000–2001: Renegades and breakup ===
On January 26, 2000, during filming of the video for "Sleep Now in the Fire", directed by Michael Moore, an altercation caused the doors of the New York Stock Exchange to be closed and the band to be escorted from the site by security after band members attempted to gain entry into the exchange. The video shoot had attracted several hundred people, according to a representative for the city's Deputy Commissioner for Public Information. New York City's film office does not allow weekday film shoots on Wall Street. Moore had permission to use the steps of Federal Hall National Memorial but did not have a permit to shoot on the sidewalk or the street, nor did he have a loud-noise permit or the proper parking permits. "Michael basically gave us one directorial instruction, 'No matter what happens, don't stop playing'," Morello recalled. When the band left the steps, police officers apprehended Moore and led him away. Moore yelled to the band, "Take the New York Stock Exchange!"

In an interview with the Socialist Worker, Morello said he and scores of others ran into the Stock Exchange. "About two hundred of us got through the first set of doors, but our charge was stopped when the Stock Exchange's titanium riot doors came crashing down." MTV News reported that security personnel denied the band entry and suggested they visit the exchange's visitor center instead. Moore said: "For a few minutes, Rage Against the Machine was able to shut down American capitalism, an act that I am sure tens of thousands of downsized citizens would cheer." However, Mark Shone of Spin magazine wrote that the protest had no effect on stock trading inside the building, and the only legal ramification was that Moore was issued a ticket for filming without a permit. Regarding Moore's version of the events, Shone wrote that "many involved in the production tell a different story and question whether Moore manipulated the shoot to produce maximum conflict."

On September 7, 2000, the band performed "Testify" at the 2000 MTV Video Music Awards. After the Best Rock Video award was given to Limp Bizkit, Commerford climbed onto the scaffolding of the set. He and his bodyguard were sentenced to a night in jail and De la Rocha reportedly left the awards after the stunt. Morello recalled that Commerford relayed his plan to the rest of the band before the show, and that both De la Rocha and Morello advised him against it immediately after Bizkit was presented the award.

On October 18, 2000, De la Rocha announced that he had left the band. He said, "I feel that it is now necessary to leave Rage because our decision-making process has completely failed. It is no longer meeting the aspirations of all four of us collectively as a band, and from my perspective, has undermined our artistic and political ideal." Morello said, "There was so much squabbling over everything, "and I mean everything. We would even have fist fights over whether our T-shirts should be mauve or camouflaged! It was ridiculous. We were patently political, internally combustible. It was ugly for a long time." De la Rocha's departure was voted the "shittiest thing" of 2000 in the Kerrang! readers' poll of that year.

The band's next album, Renegades, was a collection of covers of artists as diverse as Devo, EPMD, Minor Threat, Cypress Hill, the MC5, Afrika Bambaataa, the Rolling Stones, Eric B. & Rakim, Bruce Springsteen, the Stooges, and Bob Dylan. It achieved platinum status a month later. The following year saw the release of another live video, The Battle of Mexico City, while 2003 brought the live album Live at the Grand Olympic Auditorium, an edited recording of the band's final concerts on September 12 and 13, 2000, at the Grand Olympic Auditorium in Los Angeles. It was accompanied by an expanded DVD release of the last show, which included a previously unreleased video for "Bombtrack".

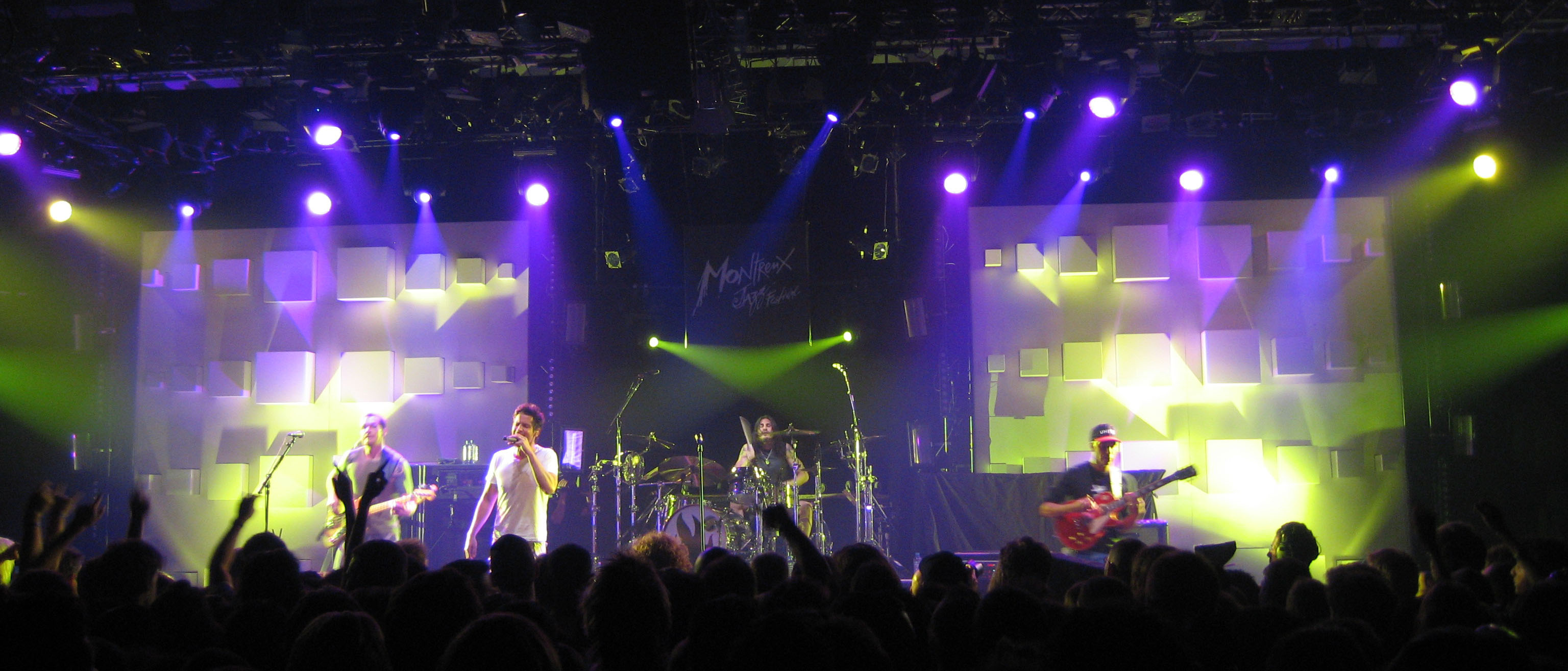
Wilk, Commerford, and Morello performing with Chris Cornell as Audioslave at the Montreux Jazz Festival in 2005

In the wake of the September 11 attacks, the controversial 2001 Clear Channel memorandum contained a long list of what the memo termed "lyrically questionable" songs for the radio, uniquely listing all of Rage Against the Machine's songs.

=== 2002–2006: Side projects ===
After the breakup, Morello, Wilk, and Commerford decided to stay together and find a new vocalist. "There was talk for a while of us becoming Ozzy Osbourne's backing band, and even Macy Gray's," said Morello. "We informed [Epic Records] that losing our singer was actually a blessing in disguise, and that we had bigger ambitions than being somebody's hired musicians." Their friend, the producer Rick Rubin, suggested they play with Chris Cornell of Soundgarden. Along with Cornell, they formed Audioslave. Their first single, "Cochise", was released in November 2002, and their self-titled debut album followed to mainly positive reviews. In contrast to Rage Against the Machine, most of Audioslave's music was apolitical, although some songs touched on political issues. Their second album, Out of Exile debuted at the number one position on the Billboard charts in 2005. Audioslave released its third album Revelations on September 4, 2006, but did not tour as Cornell and Morello were working on solo albums. After months of inactivity and rumors of a breakup, Audioslave disbanded on February 15, 2007, after Cornell announced he was leaving the band "due to irresolvable personality conflicts as well as musical differences".

In 2003, Morello began playing acoustic folk music at open-mic nights and clubs under the alias the Nightwatchman, which he formed as an outlet for his political views while playing apolitical music with Audioslave. He participated in Billy Bragg's Tell Us the Truth tour with no plans to record, but recorded a song for Songs and Artists that Inspired Fahrenheit 9/11, "No One Left". In April 2007, he released an album, One Man Revolution, followed by The Fabled City on September 30, 2008. Morello and the rapper Boots Riley formed the rap rock group Street Sweeper Social Club, and released their debut self-titled album on June 16, 2009.

De la Rocha had been working on an album with DJ Shadow, Company Flow, Roni Size and Questlove, but dropped the project in favor of working with Trent Reznor of Nine Inch Nails. The album was not released. A collaboration between De la Rocha and DJ Shadow, the song "March of Death" was released free online in 2003 in protest of the imminent invasion of Iraq. The 2004 soundtrack Songs and Artists that Inspired Fahrenheit 9/11 included one of the collaborations with Reznor, "We Want It All". In late 2005, De la Rocha performed with the son jarocho band Son de Madera, singing and playing the jarana huasteca.

The band refused large sums of money to reunite for concerts and tours. Rumors of tension between De la Rocha and the others circulated. Commerford said that he and De la Rocha saw each other often and went surfing together. Morello said he and De la Rocha communicated by phone, and had met at a 2005 protest in support of the South Central Farm.

=== 2007–2008: First reunion and tours ===
On April 14, 2007, Morello and De la Rocha reunited to perform a brief acoustic set at a Coalition of Immokalee Workers rally in downtown Chicago. Morello described the event as "very exciting for everybody in the room, myself included". Rage Against the Machine reunited to headline the final day of the 2007 Coachella Valley Music and Arts Festival on April 29, in front of an EZLN backdrop to the largest crowds of the festival. Morello said they reunited to voice their opposition to the "right-wing purgatory" the United States had "slid into" under the George W. Bush administration since their dissolution.

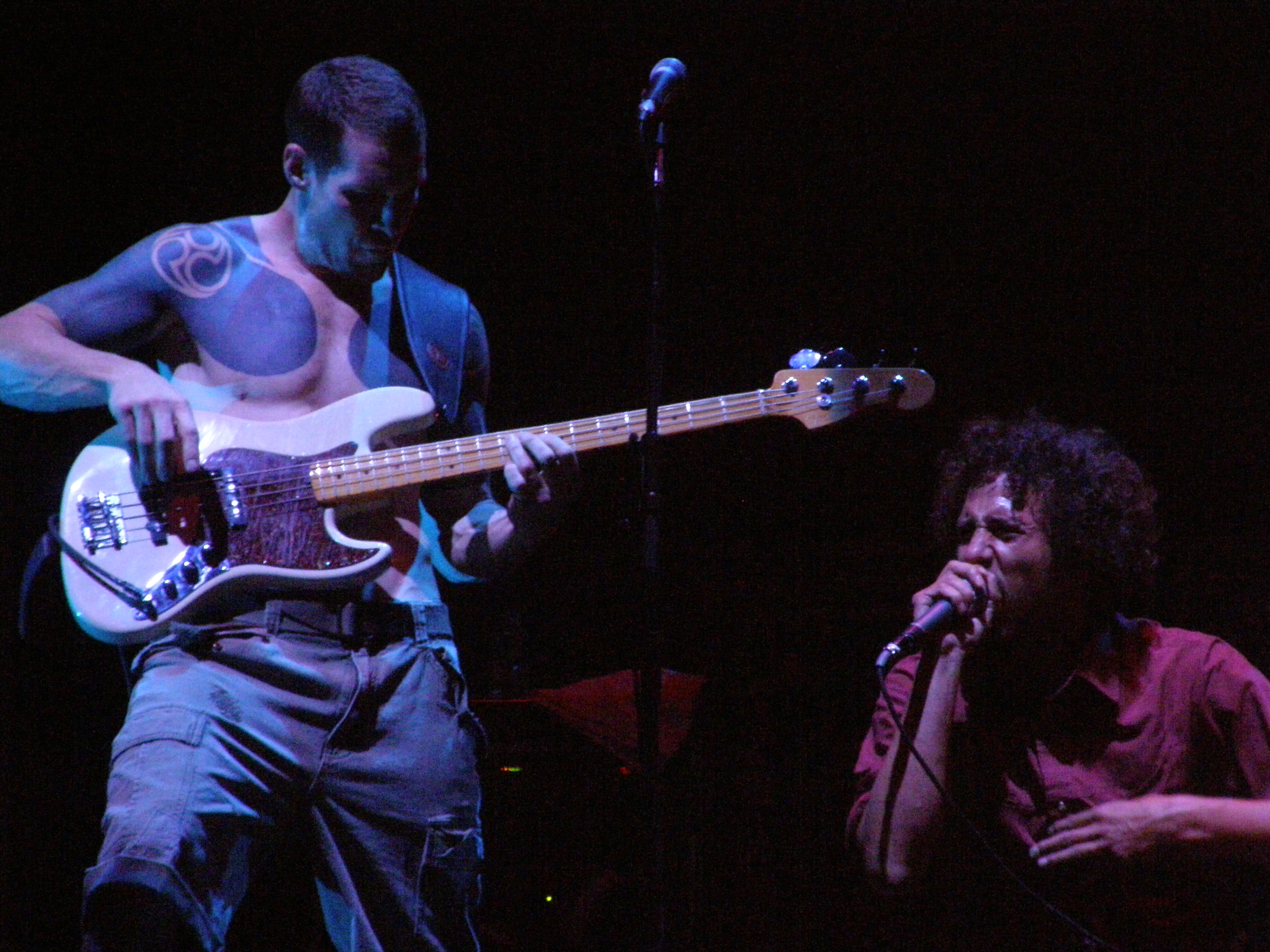
Rage Against the Machine performing in 2007

Rage Against the Machine continued to tour in the United States, New Zealand, Australia, and Japan. They played a series of shows in Europe in 2008, including Rock am Ring and Rock im Park, Pinkpop Festival, T in the Park in Scotland, the Hultsfred Festival in Sweden, the Reading and Leeds Festivals in England and the Oxegen Festival in Ireland. They also performed on August 2 in Chicago at the 2008 Lollapalooza festival. Morello explained that they had no plans to record a new album, stating: "Writing and recording albums is a whole different thing than getting back on the bike... But I think the one thing about the Rage catalog is that none of it feels dated to me. You know, it doesn't feel at all like a nostalgia show. It feels like these are songs that were born and bred to be played now." De la Rocha added: "As far as us recording music in the future, I don't know where we all fit with that. We've all embraced each other's projects and supported them, and that's great."

In July 2008, De la Rocha and the drummer Jon Theodore, formerly of the Mars Volta, released an EP as One Day as a Lion. In August 2008, during the Democratic National Convention in Denver, Rage headlined the free Tent State Music Festival to End the War. They were supported by Flobots, State Radio, Jello Biafra, and Wayne Kramer. Following the concert, the band, following uniformed veterans from the advocacy group Iraq Veterans Against the War, led the 8,000 attendees to the Denver Coliseum on a six-mile march to Invesco Field, host of the DNC. After a four-hour stand-off with police, the Obama campaign agreed to meet with members of Iraq Veterans Against the War and hear their demands.

In September 2008, Rage performed at the Target Center in Minneapolis during the Republican National Convention. The previous day, they attempted to play a surprise set at a free anti-RNC concert at the Minnesota Capitol in St. Paul, but were prevented by the police. Instead, De la Rocha and Morello rapped and sang through a megaphone. Later that evening, Morello and Boots Reilly joined the songwriter Billy Bragg and the politician Jim Walsh for a three-hour jam session at Pepitos Parkway theater in south Minneapolis. In December 2008, Morello said his Nightwatchman project would be his "principal musical focus, as I see it, for the remainder of my life". He repeated this point in an interview with the Los Angeles Times.

=== 2009–2015: UK "Killing in the Name" Christmas campaign, European tour, and L.A. Rising ===
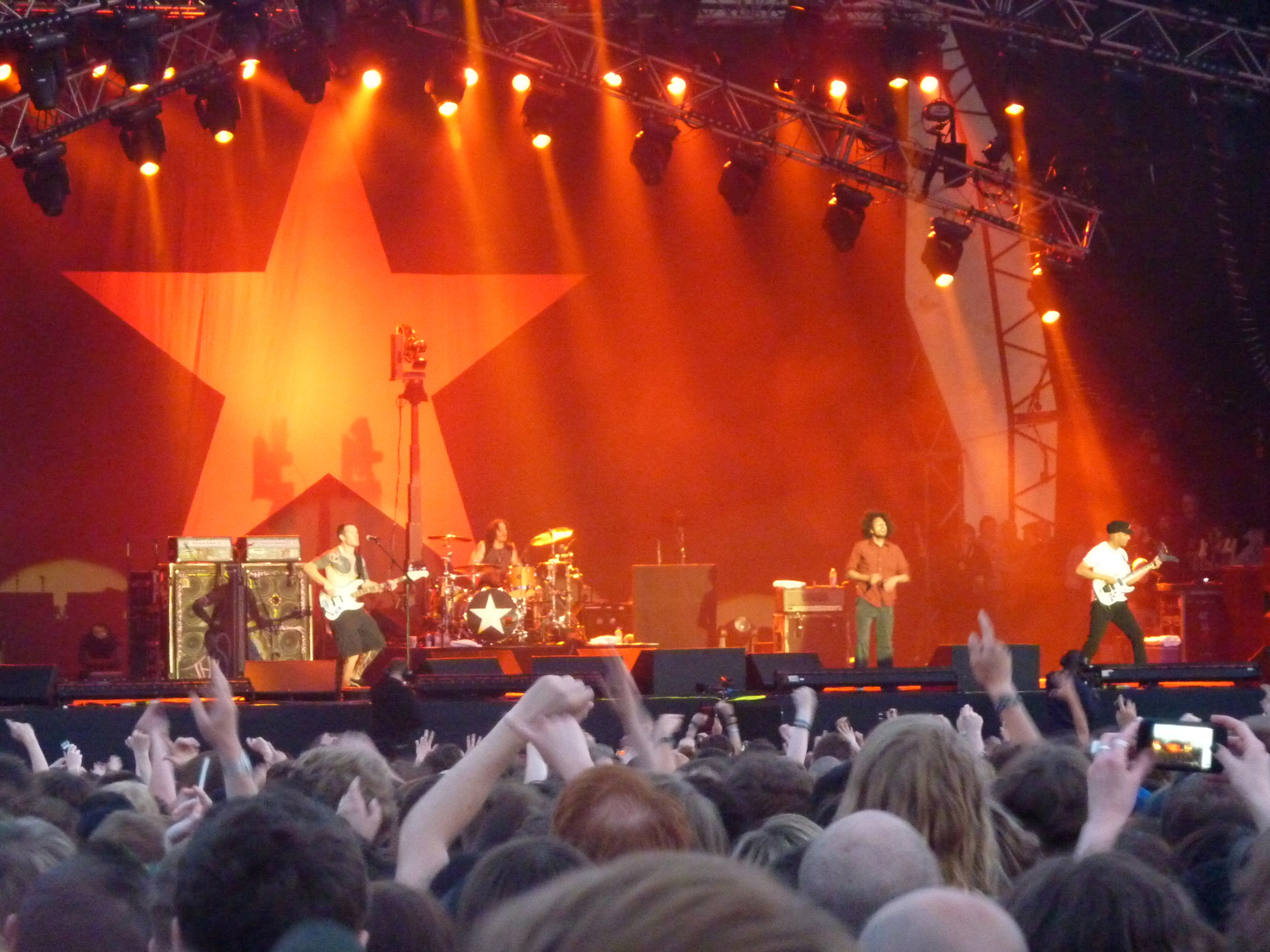
Performing in 2010

In December 2009, a campaign was launched on Facebook by Jon Morter and his wife Tracy, in order to stop, most notably, The X Factor hits from becoming almost automatic Christmas number ones on the UK Singles Chart. It generated nationwide publicity and took the track "Killing in the Name" to the coveted Christmas number one slot in the UK Singles Chart, which had been dominated for four consecutive years from 2005 by winners from the popular TV show The X Factor. Before the chart was announced on December 20, 2009, the Facebook group membership stood at over 950,000, and was acknowledged (and supported) by Tom Morello, Dave Grohl, Paul McCartney, Muse, Fightstar, NME, John Lydon, Bill Bailey, Lenny Henry, BBC Radio 1, Hadouken!, the Prodigy, Stereophonics, BBC Radio 5 Live, and even the 2004 X Factor winner Steve Brookstein, among others. On the morning of December 17, Rage Against the Machine played a slightly censored version of "Killing in the Name" live on BBC Radio 5 Live, but four repeats of 'Fuck you I won't do what you tell me' were aired before the song was pulled. During the interview before the song they reiterated their support for the campaign and their intentions to support charity with the proceeds. The campaign was ultimately successful, and "Killing in the Name" became the number-one single in the UK for Christmas 2009. De la Rocha told BBC One:

We're very very ecstatic and excited about the song reaching the number one spot. We want to thank everyone that participated in this incredible, organic, grass-roots campaign. It says more about the spontaneous action taken by young people throughout the UK to topple this very sterile pop monopoly. When young people decide to take action they can make what's seemingly impossible possible.

The band also set a new record, achieving the biggest download sales total in a first week ever in the UK charts. De la Rocha also promised the band would perform a free concert in the UK sometime in 2010 to celebrate the achievement. True to their word, the band announced that they would be performing a free concert at Finsbury Park, London, on June 6, 2010. The concert, dubbed "The Rage Factor", gave away all the tickets by free photo registration to prevent touting over the weekend of the February 13–14, followed by an online lottery on February 17. This proved to be popular, with many users facing connection issues. The tickets were all allocated by 13:30 that same day. After allowing ticket holders to vote for who they wanted to be the support acts for "The Rage Factor", it was announced that Gogol Bordello, Gallows and Roots Manuva would support Rage Against the Machine at the concert.

In addition to the free gig at Finsbury Park, the band headlined European festivals in June 2010 including the Download Festival at Donington Park, England, Rock am Ring and Rock im Park in Germany and Rock in Rio Madrid in Spain. They also performed in Ireland on June 8 and the Netherlands on June 9. Zack de la Rocha had stated that it was a definite possibility that the band would record a new album, the first time since 2000's Renegades. Morter confirmed this, stating the discussions he and the band had backstage before the Finsbury Park gig saying the band did write new material, but they had no motivation to release them until now. De la Rocha mentioned the very strong reaction from the Download Festival 2010 audience as an incentive for releasing new material. In addition, the band returned to Los Angeles on July 23, 2010, for their first U.S. show in two years and their first hometown show in 10 years. The concert benefited Arizona organizations that are fighting the SB1070 immigration law. On the night of the show, a spokesperson announced to the crowd that ticket sales—all of which are non-profit to the bands—had raised $300,000. The band has been confirmed to do a short South American tour in October, performing at venues such as the SWU Festival in Brazil, the Maquinaria Festival in Chile, and Pepsi Music Festival in Argentina. It was the first time the band played in those countries.

After the "Rage Factor" celebratory show in Finsbury Park in London on June 6, 2010, after the campaign to get "Killing in the Name" to the No. 1 spot at Christmas, Zack de la Rocha stated that it was a "genuine possibility". Stating that they may use the momentum from the campaign to get back into the studio and write a follow-up record to 2000's Renegades after 10 years. When talking to NME, Zack de la Rocha said: "I think it's a genuine possibility, We have to get our heads around what we're going to do towards the end of the year and finish up on some other projects and we'll take it from there."

During an interview with the Chilean newspaper La Tercera in October 2010, De la Rocha allegedly confirmed that a new album was in the works, with a possibility of a 2011 release. De la Rocha is reported as saying, "We are all bigger and more mature and we do not fall into the problems we faced 10 or 15 years ago. This is different and we project a lot: we are working on a new album due out next year, perhaps summer for the northern hemisphere". However, in early May 2011, guitarist Tom Morello said that the band was not working on a new album, but would not rule out the possibility of future studio work. "The band is not writing songs, the band is not in the studio", Morello told The Pulse of Radio. "We get along famously and we all, you know, intend to do more Rage Against the Machine stuff in the future, but beyond sort of working out a concert this year, there's nothing else on the schedule (for 2011)". The band created its own festival, the L.A. Rising. As Morello stated, the only Rage Against the Machine appearance for 2011 was a performance on July 30 at the L.A. Rising festival with El Gran Silencio, Immortal Technique, Lauryn Hill, Rise Against and Muse. During an interview on July 30, 2011, Commerford seemingly contradicted Morello's comments, stating that new material was being written, and specific plans for the next two years were in place.

In an October 2012 interview with TMZ, bassist Tim Commerford was asked if Rage Against the Machine was working on a new album. He simply responded, "maybe". Asked by TMZ again in November 2012 whether a new album was being worked on, Commerford replied "definitely maybe ... anything's possible". Later that month, however, Morello denied that they were working on new material, and stated that Rage Against the Machine had "no plans beyond" the reissue of their self-titled debut album. Morello said he would be open to recording new Rage Against the Machine material, but added that it was "not on the table right now".

The band announced on October 9 via their Facebook page that they would be releasing a special 20th anniversary box set to commemorate the group's debut album. The full box set contains never-before-released concert material, including the band's 2010 Finsbury Park show and footage from early in their career, as well as a digitally-remastered version of the album, B-sides and the original demo tape (on disc for the first time). The band released 3-disc and single-disc versions. The collection was released on November 27.

In an April 2014 interview with The Pulse of Radio, drummer Brad Wilk indicated that, as far as he knew, Rage Against the Machine's 2011 performance at L.A. Rising was their final show. In February 2015, Tim Commerford said that uncertainty over when they might play again was typical of the band's functioning, speculating: "It could be tomorrow; it could be 10 years from now". On October 16, the band's 2010 performance in Finsbury Park was released on DVD and Blu-ray as Live at Finsbury Park.

=== 2016–2019: Prophets of Rage ===
In May 2016, It was announced that Morello, Wilk and Commerford had formed a supergroup, Prophets of Rage, with the rappers Chuck D of Public Enemy and B-Real of Cypress Hill. The band toured through 2016 and played songs by Rage Against the Machine, Public Enemy and Cypress Hill. Commerford said that year that Rage Against the Machine had not split up. Morello said: "We have nothing but the greatest love and honor and respect for Zack de la Rocha [...] who is working on his own music, which I'm sure will be fantastic—he's a great artist in his own right. But where you're going to hear Rage Against the Machine is in Prophets of Rage." In May 2018, Wilk said a Rage Against the Machine reunion would make him happy, and that "it's just really a matter of getting us all on the same page". In November 2019, Chuck D and B-Real confirmed that Prophets of Rage had disbanded.

=== 2019–2024: Second reunion, Rock and Roll Hall of Fame induction, and third disbandment ===
On November 1, 2019, it was reported that Rage Against the Machine were reuniting for their first shows in nine years in spring 2020, including two appearances at that year's Coachella Valley Music and Arts Festival. On February 10, 2020, Rage Against the Machine announced more worldwide dates for the 2020 reunion tour, now named the Public Service Announcement Tour. It was scheduled to run from March 26 through September 12, making it the band's first full-length world tour in 20 years, after they completed the promotional cycle for their third album The Battle of Los Angeles. The supporting act on all shows but Chicago would be rap duo Run the Jewels. On March 12, 2020, the band postponed the first leg of the reunion tour due to the COVID-19 pandemic; this tour was eventually postponed to mid-2021.

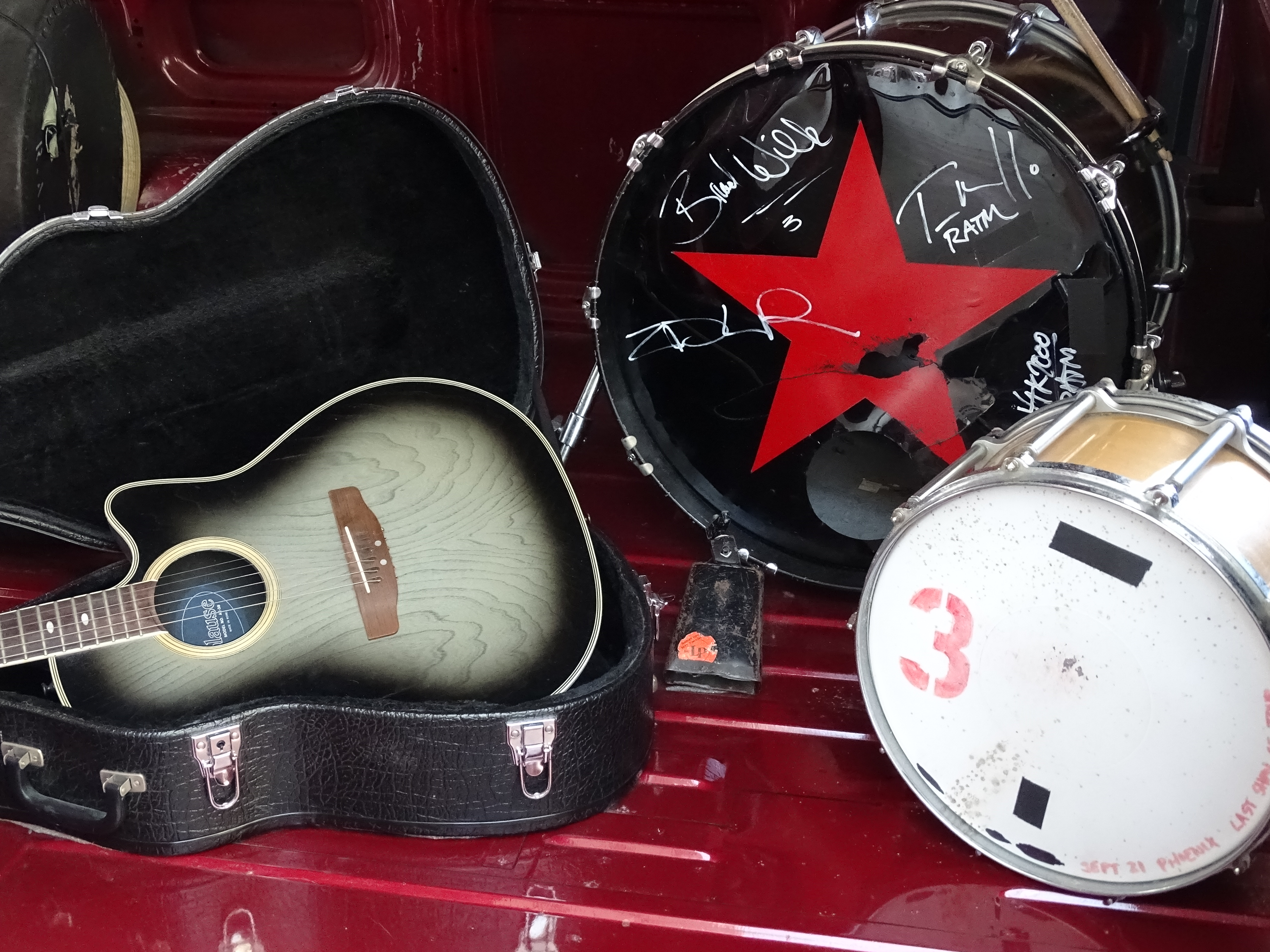
Some of the band's gear on display at the Rock and Roll Hall of Fame after their unsuccessful 2018 nomination for induction

On May 1, 2020, the band announced that they had rescheduled the remaining dates of the reunion tour to 2021. They were also due to headline the Reading and Leeds Festivals, which would have been Rage Against the Machine's first UK appearance in 10 years, but it was announced on May 12, 2020, that the festival was canceled. Despite having rescheduled all of their tour dates, Rage Against the Machine was initially still scheduled to play Coachella, which had been postponed from April to October 2020 before it was officially canceled that June. On April 8, 2021, it was announced that the Public Service Announcement Tour had once again been rescheduled to the spring and summer of 2022.

By June 11, 2020, every Rage Against the Machine album had entered the top 30 of Apple Music's Rock Albums chart, and their debut album had entered the Billboard Top 200 at number 174. The resurgence of interest in the band's music and politics was widely attributed to renewed worldwide Black Lives Matter protests following the murder of George Floyd in Minneapolis by law enforcement.

On July 9, 2022, Rage Against the Machine played their first concert in 11 years at Alpine Valley Music Theatre in East Troy, Wisconsin. After De la Rocha ruptured his Achilles tendon during a show in Chicago in July, Rage Against the Machine canceled their European tour and their remaining North American tour dates.

Rage Against the Machine was nominated for induction into the Rock & Roll Hall of Fame in their first year of eligibility in 2017, and again in 2018, 2019, and 2021. They were inducted on November 3, 2023, by Ice-T, at Barclays Center in Brooklyn. Only Morello attended the ceremony. On January 3, 2024, Wilk confirmed that Rage Against the Machine had disbanded again.

== Musical style and influences ==
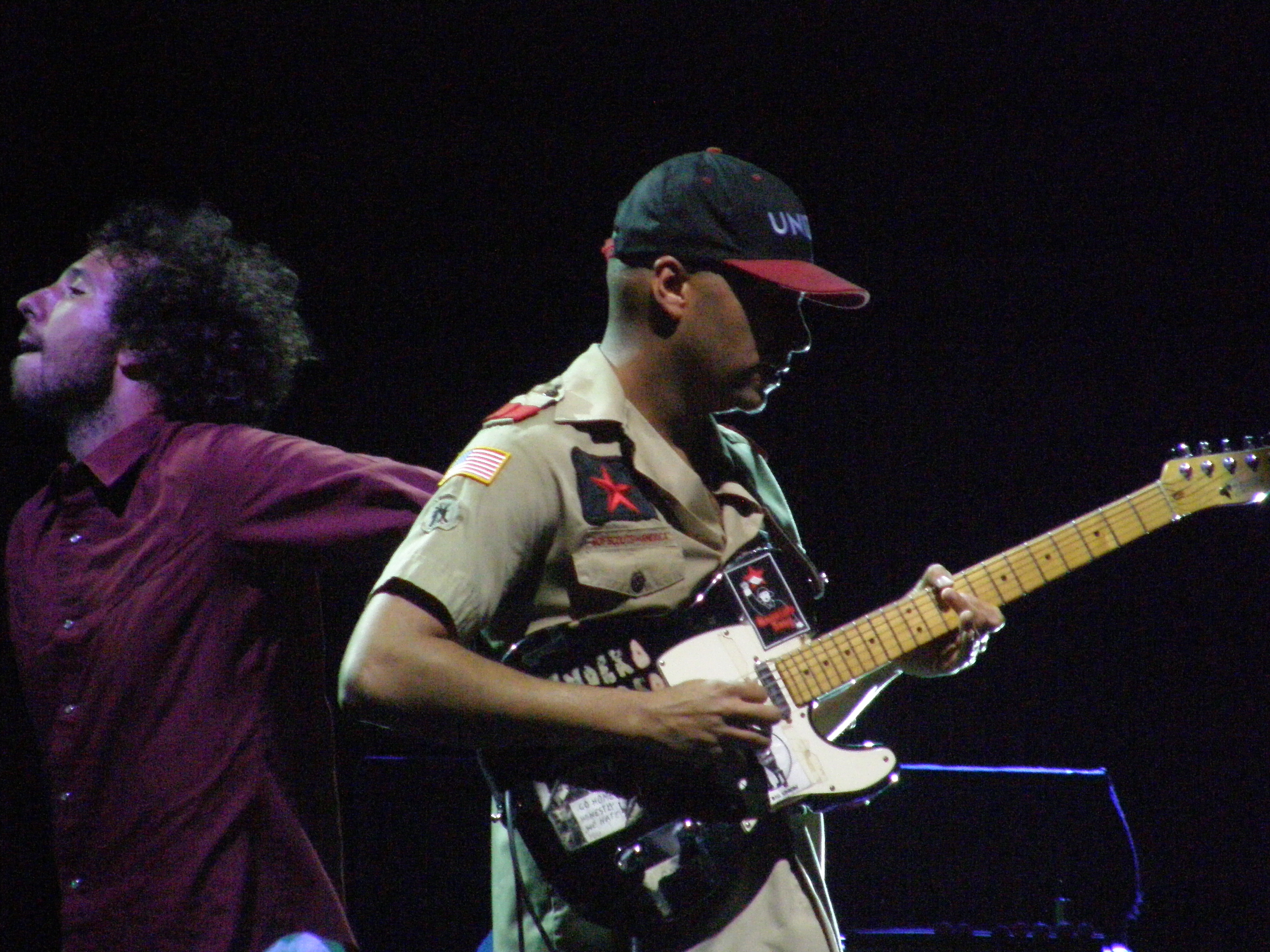
De la Rocha and Morello performing in 2007

Inspired by early heavy metal instrumentation, Rage Against the Machine has been influenced by a variety of music, including acts like Rush, Led Zeppelin, MC5, the Stooges, Bob Dylan, the Red Hot Chili Peppers, Iron Maiden, Kiss, Black Sabbath/Ozzy Osbourne, the Police, Devo, Living Colour, Queen, the Brothers Johnson and Wayne Shorter. They are also said to be influenced by hip-hop acts such as Afrika Bambaataa, Run-DMC, Public Enemy, and the Beastie Boys, punk rock such as the Clash, Minor Threat, the Teen Idles, Bad Brains, the Dead Kennedys, Black Flag, the Sex Pistols, Fugazi and Bad Religion, and crossover bands like Suicidal Tendencies and Urban Dance Squad.

Rage Against the Machine has been noted for its "fiercely polemical music, which brewed sloganeering leftist rants against corporate America, cultural imperialism, and government oppression into a Molotov cocktail of punk rock, hip hop, and thrash."

Rage Against the Machine has been described as rap metal, rap rock, funk metal, alternative metal, hard rock and alternative rock. (Note: Musical styles: "rap metal"; "rap rock"; "funk metal"; "alternative metal"; "hard rock"; "alternative rock") The band has been characterized as nu metal, although they are often instead considered a predecessor to the genre. According to Annie Zaleski of Spin: "Rage predate the explosion of nu-metal, but there's no denying that the L.A. band's sound was co-opted by plenty of nu-metalheads, who mimicked RATM's aggressive hip-hop/metal hybrids."

== Political views and activism ==
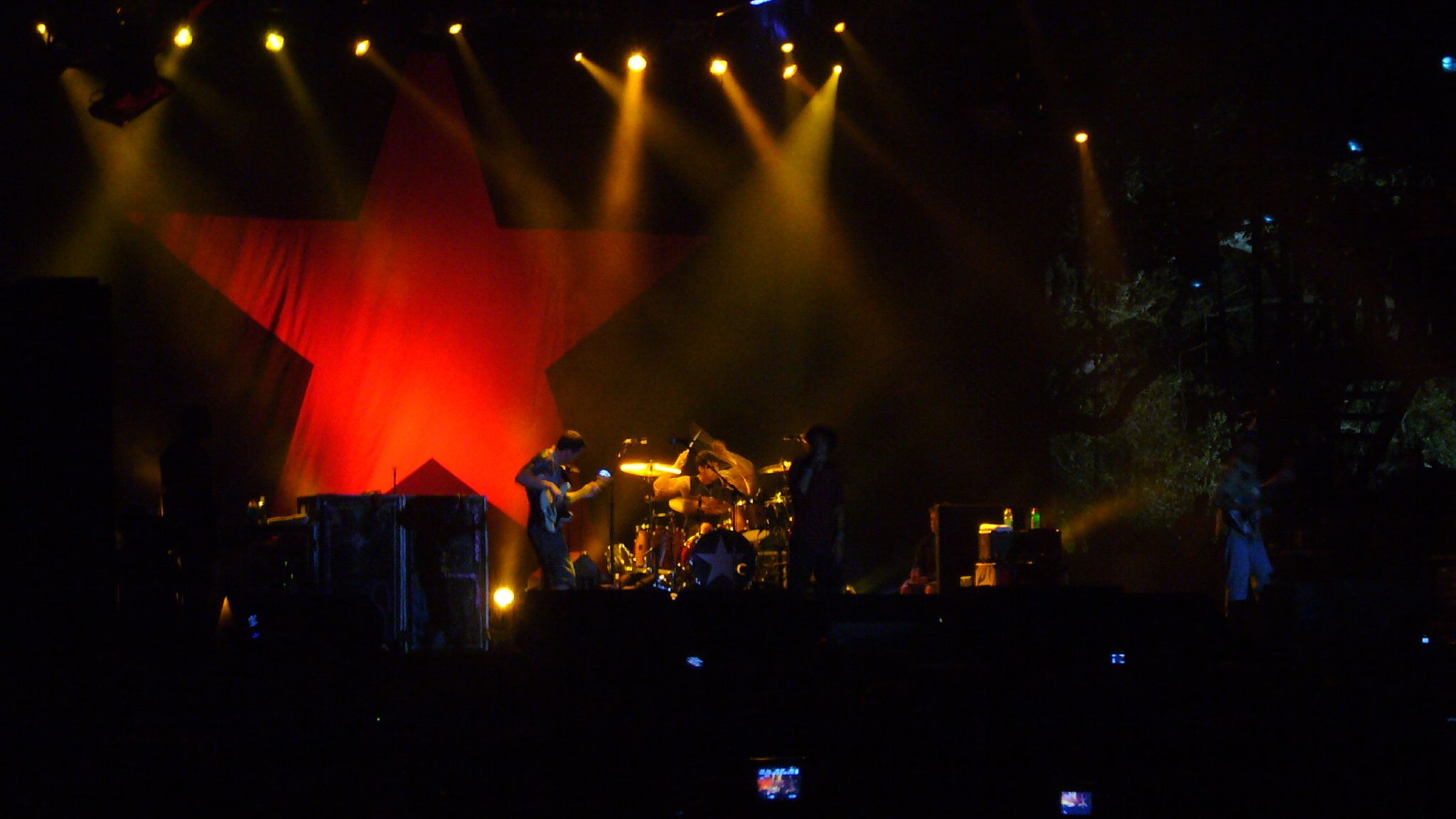
Rage performing in front of the flag of the Zapatista Army of National Liberation

The members of Rage Against the Machine are well known for their leftist anti-authoritarian and revolutionary political views, and almost all of the band's songs focus on these views. Key to the band's identity, Rage Against the Machine has voiced viewpoints highly critical of the domestic and foreign policies of current and previous U.S. governments. Throughout its existence, Rage Against the Machine and its individual members participated in political protests and other activism to advocate these beliefs. The band sees its music as a vehicle for social activism; De la Rocha explained, "I'm interested in spreading those ideas through art, because music has the power to cross borders, to break military sieges and to establish real dialogue."

Morello said of wage slavery in America:

America touts itself as the land of the free, but the number one freedom that you and I have is the freedom to enter into a subservient role in the workplace. Once you exercise this freedom you've lost all control over what you do, what is produced, and how it is produced. And in the end, the product doesn't belong to you. The only way you can avoid bosses and jobs is if you don't care about making a living. Which leads to the second freedom: the freedom to starve.

Some critics have accused the group of hypocrisy for voicing commitment to leftist causes while being millionaires signed to Epic Records, a subsidiary of media conglomerate Sony Music. Infectious Grooves released a song called "Do What I Tell Ya!" which mocks lyrics from "Killing in the Name", accusing the band of being hypocrites. In response to such critiques, Morello stated:

When you live in a capitalistic society, the currency of the dissemination of information goes through capitalistic channels. Would Noam Chomsky object to his works being sold at Barnes & Noble? No, because that's where people buy their books. We're not interested in preaching to just the converted. It's great to play abandoned squats run by anarchists, but it's also great to be able to reach people with a revolutionary message, people from Granada Hills to Stuttgart.

De la Rocha stated:

Yeah, to get as many people as possible to join the political debate, to get the dialogue going. I was wondering today, why would anyone climb to the roof of the American Embassy with a banner that says "Free Mumia Abu-Jamal", why do you do that? That's to get the international press' attention. The international network that Sony has available, is to me the perfect tool you know, it can get even more people to join a revolutionary awareness and fight.

For their 2020 reunion tour, the band announced all profits from their first three shows—in El Paso, Texas; Las Cruces, New Mexico; and Glendale, Arizona—would be donated to immigrant rights organizations in the US. For subsequent shows, 10% of the base ticket price and 100% of proceeds after fees and base ticket price were reserved for charities local to each city they were performing in.

In May 2021, more than 600 musicians, including Rage Against the Machine, added their signature to the open letter calling for a boycott of performances in Israel until the occupation of the Palestinian territories comes to an end. Zack de la Rocha and Tom Morello voiced support for a ceasefire in the Gaza war.

On June 24, 2022, the band announced that they would donate $475,000 to reproductive rights groups in Wisconsin and Illinois after the Supreme Court's ruling to overturn Roe v. Wade. During their July 9 concert in Wisconsin, the band further expressed opposition to overturning of Roe v. Wade using screened images of text including "Abort the Supreme Court" and "Forced birth in a country where black birth-givers experience maternal mortality two to three times higher than that of white birth-givers. Forced birth in a country where gun violence is the number one cause of death among children and teenagers."

== Members ==
- Zack de la Rocha – lead vocals
- Tim Commerford – bass, backing vocals
- Tom Morello – guitars
- Brad Wilk – drums, percussion

== Discography ==
Studio albums

- Rage Against the Machine (1992)
- Evil Empire (1996)
- The Battle of Los Angeles (1999)
- Renegades (2000)

== Awards and nominations ==
Rage Against the Machine has won two Grammy Awards with six nominations altogether. Rage Against the Machine was ranked 33rd on VH1's 100 Greatest Artists of Hard Rock list in 2005. In 2008, they were inducted into the Kerrang! "Hall of Fame", and in 2010 they won NME's Heroes of the Year Award. The band has also received three nominations from the MTV Video Music Awards, but has never won an award. Rage Against The Machine have been nominated for the Rock and Roll Hall of Fame in 2017, 2018, 2019, 2021, 2022, and were inducted in 2023.

In 2021, the UK Official Charts Company announced that "Killing in the Name" had been named as the 'UK's Favourite Christmas Number 1 of All Time' in a poll commissioned to celebrate the 70th Official Christmas Number 1 race (and as a tie-in with the book The Official Christmas No. 1 Singles Book by Michael Mulligan).

Grammy Awards

Year	Nominee / work	Award	Result
1997	"Tire Me"	Best Metal Performance	Won
1997	"Bulls on Parade"	Best Hard Rock Performance	Nominated
1998	"People of the Sun"	Best Hard Rock Performance	Nominated
1999	"No Shelter"	Best Metal Performance	Nominated
2001	"Guerrilla Radio"	Best Hard Rock Performance	Won
2001	The Battle of Los Angeles	Best Rock Album	Nominated
2002	"Renegades of Funk"	Best Hard Rock Performance	Nominated

MTV Video Music Awards

Year	Nominee / work	Award	Result
1996	"Bulls on Parade"	Best Rock Video	Nominated
1997	"People of the Sun"	Best Rock Video	Nominated
2000	"Sleep Now in the Fire"	Best Rock Video	Nominated

NME Awards

Year	Nominee / work	Award	Result
2010	Rage Against the Machine	Heroes of the Year	Won

Kerrang! Awards

Year	Nominee / work	Award	Result
2008	Rage Against the Machine	Hall of Fame	Won

Classic Rock Roll of Honour Awards

Year	Nominee / work	Award	Result
2010	Rage Against the Machine	Band of the Year	Nominated
2010	Christmas Number One and Free Concert	Event of the Year	Won

Rock and Roll Hall of Fame

Year	Nominee / work	Award	Result
2018	Rage Against the Machine	Rock and Roll Hall of Fame	Nominated
2019	Rage Against the Machine	Rock and Roll Hall of Fame	Nominated
2021	Rage Against the Machine	Rock and Roll Hall of Fame	Nominated
2022	Rage Against the Machine	Rock and Roll Hall of Fame	Nominated
2023	Rage Against the Machine	Rock and Roll Hall of Fame	Won
