= The Battle of Los Angeles (album) =

Studio album by Rage Against the Machine
- Released: November 2, 1999
- Recorded: September 1 – October 1, 1998
- Studios: Henson (Hollywood); Sunset Sound (Hollywood); Westlake (Los Angeles); Royaltone (Hollywood); Silent Sound (Atlanta); Southern Tracks (Atlanta)
- Genres: Rap metal; funk metal; rap rock
- Length: 45:16
- Label: Epic
- Producer: Brendan O'Brien

Rage Against the Machine chronology
Live & Rare (1998)	The Battle of Los Angeles (1999)	Renegades (2000)

Singles from The Battle of Los Angeles
- 1. "Guerrilla Radio" Released: October 1999; 2. "Sleep Now in the Fire" Released: April 2000; 3. "Testify" Released: August 2000

The Battle of Los Angeles is the third studio album by the American rock band Rage Against the Machine, released by Epic Records on November 2, 1999. At the 43rd Annual Grammy Awards, it was nominated for Best Rock Album, and the song "Guerrilla Radio" won the award for Best Hard Rock Performance. In their year-end lists, Time and Rolling Stone magazines both named the album the best of 1999.

The album has been certified double platinum by the Recording Industry Association of America, indicating sales of at least two million units. It would be the last full-length studio album of original material released by the band before their first breakup in 2000 (their next album consisted entirely of covers and was released after the breakup).

== Music and concept ==
Musically, The Battle of Los Angeles has been described as rap metal, funk metal, and rap rock. "Voice of the Voiceless", a song referring to American political activist and journalist Mumia Abu-Jamal, references a letter written by Mao Zedong, called "A Single Spark Can Start a Prairie Fire".

The album's cover art was an original piece spraypainted by Joey Krebs (also known as "The Street Phantom", "The Phantom Street Artist", or Joel Jaramillo), a well-known Los Angeles graffiti artist who has exhibited at numerous galleries in Los Angeles, New York City, and throughout the United States. Phantom's graffiti work regularly uses an outline profile of a human with text overlaid.

== Release and promotion ==
The Battle of Los Angeles debuted at No. 1 on the Billboard 200 chart, selling around 420,000 copies in its first week and keeping Mariah Carey's highly anticipated new album Rainbow from reaching the top of the chart. It was nominated for Best Rock Album at the 43rd Annual Grammy Awards.

The music videos made for "Sleep Now in the Fire" and "Testify" were directed by documentarian Michael Moore, who appears in both videos.

== Critical reception ==
Professional ratings
Review scores
Source	Rating
AllMusic	4/5 stars
Entertainment Weekly	A
Houston Chronicle	4/5 stars
Los Angeles Times	4/4 stars
NME	7/10
Pitchfork	8.7/10
Rolling Stone	4/5 stars
The Rolling Stone Album Guide	5/5 stars
Spin	9/10
USA Today	4/4 stars

In their year-end lists, Time and Rolling Stone magazines both named The Battle of Los Angeles the best album of 1999. Retrospectively, it was ranked No. 426 on Rolling Stone's 2003 list of the 500 greatest albums of all time. In 2005, the album was listed at No. 53 on Spin's list of the 100 greatest albums from 1985–2005, as well as No. 369 on Rock Hard magazine's book The 500 Greatest Rock & Metal Albums of All Time. In 2021, Metal Hammer magazine named it one of the 20 best metal albums of 1999.

=== Awards ===
- 1999: No. 1 Time Magazine Critic Pick (The Best Music of 1999)
- 1999: No. 1 Rolling Stone Critic Pick (Best Album of 1999)

== Track listing ==
All lyrics are written by Zack de la Rocha; all music is composed by Rage Against the Machine (de la Rocha, Tim Commerford, Tom Morello, and Brad Wilk).

No.	Title	Length
1.	"Testify"	3:30
2.	"Guerrilla Radio"	3:26
3.	"Calm Like a Bomb"	4:58
4.	"Mic Check"	3:33
5.	"Sleep Now in the Fire"	3:25
6.	"Born of a Broken Man"	4:40
7.	"Born as Ghosts"	3:22
8.	"Maria"	3:48
9.	"Voice of the Voiceless"	2:31
10.	"New Millennium Homes"	3:44
11.	"Ashes in the Fall"	4:37
12.	"War Within a Breath"	3:36
Total length:		45:10

Australian and Japanese edition bonus track
No.	Title	Length
13.	"No Shelter"	4:06
Total length:		49:16

=== Bonus promo CD/tape ===
In the US, some retail stores gave a free promo CD to those who pre-ordered the album that contained the songs "Clear the Lane" (from the "Killing in the Name" single) and "Hadda Be Playing on the Jukebox" (Live) (from the "Bulls on Parade" single). In Australia, certain chains gave a promo tape titled New... Live... Rare to those who pre-ordered the album that featured "Calm Like a Bomb" and the aforementioned two songs repeated on both sides. The versions of all three songs were the same as those that had been previously released.

== Personnel ==
Rage Against the Machine

- Zack de la Rocha – vocals
- Tom Morello – guitars
- Y. tim K. – bass
- Brad Wilk – drums

Production

- Brendan O'Brien – producer, mixing
- Rage Against the Machine – co-production
- Nick DiDia – engineer, recording
- Russ Fowler – additional engineering
- Sugar D (David Russo) – additional engineering
- German Villacorta – assistant engineering (at A&M Studios)
- Roger Sommers – assistant engineering (at Royaltone Studios)
- Kevin Lively – assistant engineering (at Silent Sound Studios)
- Ryan Williams – engineering (at Southern Tracks)
- Karl Egsieker – assistant engineering (at Southern Tracks)
- Monique Mitzrahl – assistant engineering (at Sunset Sound)
- Kevin Dean – assistant engineering (at Sunset Sound)
- Michael Parnin – assistant engineering (at Westlake Audio)
- "Atom" – assistant engineering (at Westlake Audio)
- Stephen Marcussen – mastering
- Andrew Garver – digital editing
- Cheryl Mondello – production coordination
- Erin Haley – production coordination

Artwork and design

- Rage Against the Machine – art direction
- Aimee Macauley – art direction
- Joey Krebs, The Phantom Street Artist – original spraypainted artwork
- Danny Clinch – photography
- Matt DeMello (as "eye cue") – photography
- Steven Tirona – additional photography

Studios

- A&M Studios, Los Angeles, CA – recording, mixing
- Royaltone Studios, Los Angeles, CA – recording, mixing
- Silent Sound Studios, Atlanta, GA – recording, mixing
- Southern Tracks, Atlanta, GA – recording, mixing
- Sunset Sound, Los Angeles, CA – recording, mixing
- Westlake Audio, Los Angeles, CA – recording, mixing
- A&M Mastering Studios, Los Angeles, CA – mastering

== Charts ==
=== Weekly charts ===
Chart (1999)	Peak position
Australian Albums (ARIA)	2
Austrian Albums (Ö3 Austria)	17
Belgian Albums (Ultratop Flanders)	20
Belgian Albums (Ultratop Wallonia)	25
Canadian Albums (Billboard)	1
Danish Albums (Hitlisten)	19
Dutch Albums (Album Top 100)	28
Europe (European Top 100 Albums)	7
Finnish Albums (Suomen virallinen lista)	2
French Albums (SNEP)	10
German Albums (Offizielle Top 100)	7
Italian Albums (FIMI)	16
New Zealand Albums (RMNZ)	1
Norwegian Albums (VG-lista)	2
Scottish Albums (Official Charts)	68
Spanish Albums (PROMUSICAE)	11
Swedish Albums (Sverigetopplistan)	4
Swiss Albums (Schweizer Hitparade)	15
UK Albums (Official Charts)	23
UK Rock & Metal Albums (Official Charts)	1
US Billboard 200	1
US Top Catalog Albums (Billboard)	43

=== Year-end charts ===
Chart (1999)	Position
Australian Albums (ARIA)	35
US Billboard 200	139
Chart (2000)	Position
Canadian Albums (Nielsen SoundScan)	169
US Billboard 200	53

== Certifications ==
Region	Certification	Certified units/sales
Australia (ARIA)	Platinum	70,000^{^}
Canada (Music Canada)	3× Platinum	300,000^{‡}
Japan (RIAJ)	Gold	100,000^{^}
New Zealand (RMNZ)	Gold	7,500^{^}
United Kingdom (BPI)	Platinum	300,000^{*}
United States (RIAA)	2× Platinum	2,000,000^{^}
^{*} Sales figures based on certification alone.^{^} Shipments figures based on certification alone.^{‡} Sales+streaming figures based on certification alone.

== Appearances in other media ==
"Maria" was covered by Canadian-American singer Grandson in 2019.
