= Calm Like a Bomb =

Song by Rage Against the Machine

from the album The Battle of Los Angeles
- Released: November 2, 1999
- Genre: Rap metal, funk metal
- Length: 4:59
- Label: Epic
- Songwriters: Tim Commerford, Zack de la Rocha, Tom Morello, Brad Wilk
- Producers: Rage Against the Machine; Brendan O'Brien

"Calm Like a Bomb" is a song by American rock band Rage Against the Machine from their third album The Battle of Los Angeles. Like their song "Tire Me" from the 1996 album Evil Empire, “Calm Like a Bomb” never had a music video or was released on any media formats. It did, however, receive enough radio airplay to become an album favorite.

The artwork most commonly associated with the song is from a competition the band held for the then upcoming album The Battle of Los Angeles. Competing artists were given titles to put on their covers including "Agunzagun", "Battle Hymns", and "The Battle of Los Angeles". One of the titles was even a verse from “Calm Like a Bomb” - "The Riot Be the Rhyme of the Unheard". Tom Morello eventually used the name "Battle Hymns" for a track on his debut album, One Man Revolution in 2007.

"Calm Like a Bomb" is notable as a display of guitarist Tom Morello's creative use of a whammy pedal. Like many of RATM's songs, the song's lyrics take a radical and violent approach to the topic of social inequalities. The song also features a reference to Emiliano Zapata. Tim Commerford uses a combination of a home-made overdrive pedal and the Jim Dunlop 105Q Bass Wah pedal on his bass throughout the song. In Rolling Stone magazine's feature article on the new "Guitar Heroes," a section was printed about Tom Morello, and “Calm Like a Bomb” was cited as the prime example of his skill and fame on the guitar. He has occasionally referred to the extremely high whammy-pedal effects used in songs such as this as "pterodactyl sounds."

"Calm Like a Bomb" made its live debut on June 11, 1999, at the K-Rock Dysfunctional Family Picnic in Wantagh, New York at Jones Beach Amphitheater.

It was prominently featured in the ending credits of The Matrix Reloaded and was also included in the film's soundtrack.
