= Sleep Now in the Fire =

Single by Rage Against the Machine

from the album The Battle of Los Angeles
- Released: April 2000
- Recorded: 1998
- Genre: Funk metal, alternative metal, hard rock, rap rock
- Length: 3:25
- Label: Epic
- Composer: Rage Against the Machine
- Lyricist: Zack de la Rocha
- Producer: Brendan O'Brien

Rage Against the Machine singles chronology
"Guerrilla Radio" (1999)	"Sleep Now in the Fire" (2000)	"Testify" (2000)

Limited Edition Part 2 (UK)

Music video
- "Sleep Now in the Fire" on YouTube

"Sleep Now in the Fire" is a song by American rock band Rage Against the Machine. It was released as the second single from their third studio album, The Battle of Los Angeles (1999).

The end of the song features a snippet of music from a Korean pop radio station picked up through one of guitarist Tom Morello's pedals.

== Music video ==
The music video for the song, which was directed by Michael Moore with cinematography by Welles Hackett, features the band playing in front of the New York Stock Exchange, intercut with scenes from a satire of the popular television game show Who Wants to Be a Millionaire?, named Who Wants To Be Filthy F#&%ing Rich. Quoted at the end of the song is Republican politician Gary Bauer stating that, "a band called 'The Machine Rages On'—'Rage Against the Machine'—that band is anti-family and it's pro-terrorist", following an incident outside of fellow Republican Alan Keyes' 2000 primary campaign town hall event, where Keyes jumped into a mosh pit formed while the song "Guerrilla Radio" by Rage Against the Machine was playing.

The video starts by saying that on January 24, 2000, the NYSE announced record profits and layoffs, and on the next day New York mayor Rudy Giuliani decreed that Rage Against the Machine "shall not play on Wall Street". The shoot for the music video on January 26, 2000, caused the doors of the New York Stock Exchange to be closed. The production had attracted several hundred people, according to a representative for the city's Deputy Commissioner for Public Information. New York City's film office does not allow weekday film shoots on Wall Street. Moore had permission to use the steps of Federal Hall National Memorial but did not have a permit to shoot on the sidewalk or the street, nor did he have a loud-noise permit or the proper parking permits. "Michael basically gave us one directorial instruction, 'No matter what happens, don't stop playing'," Tom Morello recalled. When the band left the steps, NYPD apprehended Moore and led him away. Moore yelled to the band, "Take the New York Stock Exchange!" In an interview with the Socialist Worker, Morello said he and scores of others ran into the Stock Exchange. "About two hundred of us got through the first set of doors, but our charge was stopped when the Stock Exchange's titanium riot doors came crashing down." Green Left reported that trading was forced to close sometime between 2:52pm and 3:15pm, but Mark Schone of Spin said that trading never stopped.

"We decided to shoot this video in the belly of the beast", said Moore, who was detained by police for an hour and threatened with arrest during the shooting of the video, as Moore had a permit to film on the steps of City Hall but not in the surrounding street.

During the 2016 presidential election, the video was noted for its inclusion of a shot of a man holding a "Donald Trump for President" placard during Trump's first run for president in the 2000 election.

== Track listing ==
=== Sleep Now in the Fire (EP) (import) ===
1. "Sleep Now in the Fire"
2. "Guerrilla Radio" (live)
3. "Sleep Now in the Fire" (live)
4. "Bulls on Parade" (live)
5. "Freedom" (live)

=== "Sleep Now in the Fire" (single) (import) ===
1. "Sleep Now in the Fire"
2. "Bulls on Parade" (live)
3. "Freedom" (live)
4. "Sleep Now in the Fire" (live)

=== "Sleep Now in the Fire", Limited Edition Part 1 (UK) ===
1. "Sleep Now in the Fire"
2. "Bulls on Parade" (live)
3. "Sleep Now in the Fire" (live)

==== Version 2 ====
1. "Sleep Now in the Fire"
2. "Guerrilla Radio" (live)
3. "Bulls on Parade" (live)
4. "Freedom" (live)
5. "Sleep Now in the Fire" (live)

=== "Sleep Now in the Fire", Limited Edition Part 2 (UK) ===
1. "Sleep Now in the Fire"
2. "Guerrilla Radio" (live)
3. "Freedom" (live)
4. "Sleep Now in the Fire" (video)
- All five live B-sides are taken from The Battle of Mexico City.

== Charts ==
Chart performance for "Sleep Now in the Fire"
Chart (2000)	Peak position
Australia (ARIA)	94
Scotland Singles (Official Charts)	42
UK Singles (Official Charts)	43
UK Rock & Metal (Official Charts)	2
US Alternative Airplay (Billboard)	8
US Bubbling Under Hot 100 (Billboard)	12
US Mainstream Rock (Billboard)	16

== Certifications ==
Region	Certification	Certified units/sales
New Zealand (RMNZ)	Gold	15,000^{‡}
^{‡} Sales+streaming figures based on certification alone.
