= Testify (Rage Against the Machine song) =

Single by Rage Against the Machine

from the album The Battle of Los Angeles
- Released: 2000
- Recorded: 1998
- Length: 3:30
- Composer: Rage Against the Machine
- Lyricist: Zack de la Rocha
- Producers: Rage Against the Machine; Brendan O'Brien

Rage Against the Machine singles chronology
"Sleep Now in the Fire" (1999)	"Testify" (2000)	"Renegades of Funk" (2001)

Music video
- "Testify" on YouTube

"Testify" is a song by American rock band Rage Against the Machine. It is the opening track from their third studio album, The Battle of Los Angeles (1999), and was released as the third single from the album.

The cover of the single was taken from the 1968 Olympics Black Power Salute. The lyrics in the bridge of the song quote a slogan attributed to the ruling totalitarian political party in George Orwell's dystopian 1949 novel Nineteen Eighty-Four, which reads, "Who controls the past controls the future: who controls the present controls the past."

== Live performances ==
A song titled "Testify" was performed at the KROQ Almost Acoustic X-Mas, 12.12.1993. The song is completely unrelated to the Battle of Los Angeles track except for the title. Although the song was played only this once and disappeared, some of the lyrics were used for "Down Rodeo" and the final version of "People of the Sun".

"Testify" made its live debut under the working title "Hendrix" on January 23, 1999, at a surprise club show at the Troubador in West Hollywood, California. While the instrumental part was identical to the final version, the lyrics were completely different.

Rage Against the Machine opened most of the concerts in its reunion tour with "Testify".

== Guitar and bass ==
The song, like many Rage Against the Machine songs, is notable for Tom Morello's unorthodox use of his guitar to create unusual sounds, as well as his use of drop D (D-A-D-G-B-E) tuning. Morello plays the sweeping sound in the song's intro and verse using a mixture of effects and techniques. First, he sets a DigiTech Whammy pedal to harmonize a minor 7th above the note being played, and the delay pedal is set to a short, slap-back setting that almost sounds like reverb. Morello creates the sound by simply picking the open low D string and using his wah-wah pedal to slowly shift back & forth between the bass and treble frequencies. For the song's solo, Morello removes the lead from the jack of his guitar and taps it against the bridge, while manipulating his Whammy and wah pedals, creating a squealing noise; Morello sometimes uses this technique to improvise on songs live. During more recent live performances of the song, Morello sometimes claps the lead in his hands while manipulating his pedals for the solo.

The bass in the song is also tuned to drop D, Commerford plays the verse by first sliding on the lower D string from the 12th fret to open string then repeating it again on the third bar, followed by a slide from open string to the 12th fret, then doing the 12th fret to open string slide again, followed by some syncopated muting and notes. For the chorus, Commerford plays the same riff as the guitar, while the bridge section before the guitar solo has a funk feel.

== Music video ==
The music video, directed by Michael Moore, features a group of aliens, with the title card "Aliens plot to conquer Earth!" followed by "Launch the mutant now!", after which a number of clips showing the two presidential candidates at the time (George W. Bush and Al Gore for the 2000 US Presidential Election) stating the same policies and views on important issues, and the movie aims to highlight the lack of choice in the US electoral system. This is spoofed in the video as the images of Bush and Gore are morphed together, thereby creating a "mutant" that "appears as two but speaks as one."

Other key themes in the video focus on America's reliance on oil, with several clips of the Gulf War, and lines at gas pumps accompanied by the lines "Mass graves for the pump and the price is set." Other clips display modern industrialization and the military industrial complex, juxtaposed against images of third world nations.

Other organizations, topics, and individuals displayed in the video include: Exxon, George W. Bush's reaction to same sex relationships, Richard Nixon, Kenneth Starr, Bill Clinton, Oliver North, Monica Lewinsky, Ronald Reagan, George H. W. Bush, Pope John Paul II, General Norman Schwarzkopf, the Christian Coalition, monster truck rallies, the Republican Revolution, and the corporate donations that each candidate has received.

The similarities between the two candidates are displayed through sound bites of their speeches. Among the topics that George W. Bush and Al Gore agree on, as shown in the video: support of the death penalty, prosperity through free trade, investing in the future, support of clean air, and a ban on soft money. Each candidate concludes by stating "God Bless you."

The video ends with a quote from Ralph Nader: "If you're not turned on to politics, politics will turn on you."

== Track listing ==
1. "Testify" (Album Version) - 3:31
2. "Testify" (Testifly Mix) - 3:50
3. "Testify" (Rowena Projects Mix) - 4:23
4. "Guerrilla Radio" (Live) - 3:35
5. "Freedom" (Live) - 8:39

== Charts ==
=== Year-end charts ===
Chart (2001)	Position
Canada (Nielsen SoundScan)	186
