= Guerrilla Radio =

Single by Rage Against the Machine

from the album The Battle of Los Angeles
- Released: October 1999
- Recorded: 1998
- Genre: Rap metal; funk metal
- Length: 3:26
- Label: Epic
- Composer: Rage Against the Machine
- Lyricist: Zack de la Rocha
- Producer: Brendan O'Brien

Rage Against the Machine singles chronology
"No Shelter" (1998)	"Guerrilla Radio" (1999)	"Sleep Now in the Fire" (1999)

Limited Edition Part 2 (UK)

Music video
- "Guerrilla Radio" on YouTube

"Guerrilla Radio" is a song by American rock band Rage Against the Machine. It was released as the lead single from their third studio album, The Battle of Los Angeles (1999). It charted on the Billboard Hot 100, peaking at No. 69. The band won the Grammy Award for Best Hard Rock Performance for this song.

The song is one of 31 music files in the Sony BMG v. Tenenbaum case, which resulted in finding the individual file-sharer liable for copyright infringement in July 2009, demanding an award of $22,500 a song.

== Live performances ==
"Guerrilla Radio" was performed live on the Late Show with David Letterman on November 3, 1999. The performance was controversial due to Zack de la Rocha giving the middle finger on live TV and wearing a "Free Mumia Abu-Jamal" T-shirt.

== Music video ==
The music video for "Guerrilla Radio" was shot by production company Squeak Pictures and directed by Honey, i.e., the husband-and-wife directorial team of Laura Kelly and Nicholas Brooks.

The video opens with people sitting and working at individual sewing stations on top of platforms in an all white room as the jazz song "Broken in Two" plays. After a moment, a scratching record interrupts the music and the phrase "everybody in denial" flashes on screen. Rage Against the Machine replaces the workers in the room, calmly playing their instruments. As the music video progresses, the band plays their music with more typical physicality and excited energy. During the bridge, the figure of a well-dressed man oversees the workers. The camera zooms in on the face of his wrist watch where the numbers crossfade into a top-down view of the workers at their stations and a little girl standing in the center. The camera tilts down to the girl where she is then grabbed and dragged away by the man.

Interspersed in the music video is the story of a young couple spending the day together. In the first main scene, they visit a clothing store where the woman tries on various outfits. After deciding on a sporty outfit, the woman pays with a credit card and then she morphs into a plastic-y, mannequin-like figure. Later in another scene (now both having morphed), the couple plays racquetball. They have a difficult time controlling their movements, inadvertently bumping into each other. As their match progresses, the woman knocks the man's head off and then her body completely shatters as it collapses.

The music video, which touches upon several political issues, including the exploitation of garment workers, parodies the popular late '90s Gap commercials directed by Pedro Romhanyi. These ads featured attractive young people wearing Gap clothing singing songs against a white backdrop. The phrase "everybody in denial" is a play on "everybody in khaki", which was a Gap TV ad campaign at the time.

== Track listing ==
US CD single

1. "Guerrilla Radio"
2. "Without a Face (Live Version)"

UK limited edition maxi single, part one

1. "Guerrilla Radio"
2. "No Shelter"
3. "The Ghost of Tom Joad"

UK limited edition maxi single, part two

1. "Guerrilla Radio" (Radio Edit)
2. "Fuck tha Police" (Live) (N.W.A cover)
3. "Freedom" (Live)

== Charts ==
=== Weekly charts ===
Weekly chart performance for "Guerrilla Radio"
Chart (1999–2000)	Peak position
Australia (ARIA)	57
Norway (VG-lista)	17
Scottish Singles Sales (Official Charts)	23
Spain (Promusicae)	9
Sweden (Sverigetopplistan)	42
UK Singles (Official Charts)	32
UK Rock & Metal (Official Charts)	1
US Billboard Hot 100	69
US Alternative Airplay (Billboard)	6
US Mainstream Rock (Billboard)	11

=== Year-end charts ===
2001 year-end chart performance for "Guerrilla Radio"
Chart (2001)	Position
Canada (Nielsen SoundScan)	177

2002 year-end chart performance for "Guerrilla Radio"
Chart	Position
Canada (Nielsen SoundScan)	185

== Certifications ==
Certifications for "Guerrilla Radio"
Region	Certification	Certified units/sales
New Zealand (RMNZ)	Platinum	30,000^{‡}
United Kingdom (BPI)	Silver	200,000^{‡}
^{‡} Sales+streaming figures based on certification alone.

== Use in other media ==
On January 28, 2000, documentary film maker Michael Moore convinced campaigning politician Alan Keyes to mosh in a truck with young teenagers listening to "Guerrilla Radio". Keyes, who was campaigning for the Republican nomination at the Iowa caucuses, agreed to join in the mosh for the endorsement of Moore's satirical television show, The Awful Truth. The song was also featured in the video games Tony Hawk's Pro Skater 2 and Tony Hawk's Pro Skater 1 + 2. It would also go on to be used in the first season of Netflix's animated series Devil May Cry, which is based on the eponymous video game series by Capcom.
