= Audioslave discography =

Band discography

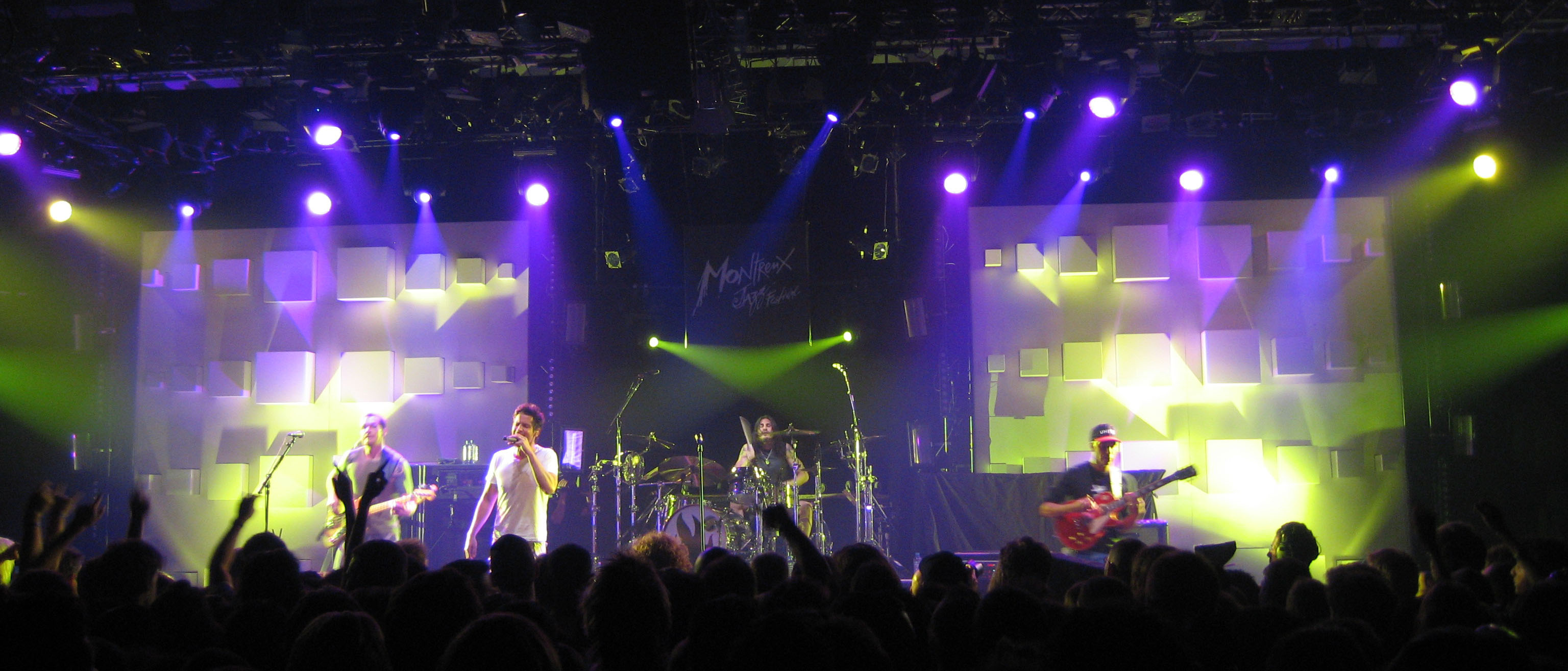
- Audioslave performing in 2005
- Studio albums: 3
- Extended plays: 2
- Singles: 14
- Video albums: 2
- Music videos: 10

The discography of Audioslave, an American hard rock band, consists of three studio albums, two extended plays (EPs), fourteen singles, two video albums and ten music videos. Formed in Los Angeles, California in 2001, Audioslave was a supergroup featuring vocalist Chris Cornell (Soundgarden and Temple of the Dog) alongside three former members of Rage Against the Machine: guitarist Tom Morello, bassist Tim Commerford and drummer Brad Wilk. Signed to Epic and Interscope Records, the band released its self-titled debut album in November 2002, which peaked at number 7 on the US Billboard 200. Supported by five singles, all of which reached the top ten of the Billboard Mainstream Rock Songs chart, Audioslave was certified triple platinum by the Recording Industry Association of America (RIAA). The band's first video album, also self-titled, was released in 2003 and reached number 5 on the Billboard Top Music Videos chart, receiving a gold certification from the RIAA.

The band returned in 2005 with their second studio album Out of Exile, which topped the Billboard 200 and the Canadian Albums Chart, as well as reaching the top ten of the UK Albums Chart. The album's lead single also reached the top 40 of both the Billboard Hot 100 and the UK Singles Chart. Later in the year the group also released its first live video Live in Cuba, which topped the Billboard Top Music Videos chart and was certified platinum by the RIAA. Audioslave released its third and final studio album Revelations in 2006, which debuted at number 2 on the Billboard 200 and topped the Canadian Albums Chart. The album's lead single "Original Fire" charted in the US, Australia and the UK. Within a year of the album's release, Cornell had announced his departure from Audioslave and the band had broken up. The group reunited for a one-off performance in January 2017, before Cornell was found dead while on tour with Soundgarden in May 2017.

== Studio albums ==
List of studio albums, with selected chart positions and certifications
Title	Album details	Peak chart positions										Certifications
Title	Album details	US	AUS	CAN	DEN	FIN	IRL	NOR	NZ	SWE	UK	Certifications
Audioslave	Released: November 19, 2002; Labels: Epic, Interscope; Formats: CD, LP	7	8	6	37	28	21	5	4	14	19	RIAA: 3× Platinum; ARIA: 3× Platinum; BPI: Platinum; IFPI FIN: Gold; MC: 2× Platinum; RMNZ: 3× Platinum
Out of Exile	Released: May 23, 2005; Labels: Epic, Interscope; Formats: CD, LP, DL	1	3	1	5	5	3	1	1	2	5	RIAA: Platinum; ARIA: Platinum; BPI: Gold; MC: Platinum; RMNZ: Platinum
Revelations	Released: September 4, 2006; Labels: Epic, Interscope; Formats: CD, LP, DL	2	1	1	6	2	7	5	1	6	12	RIAA: Gold; ARIA: Gold; BPI: Silver; MC: Gold; RMNZ: Gold

== Extended plays ==
List of extended plays
Title	EP details
Sessions @AOL Music	Released: October 11, 2005; Labels: Epic, Interscope; Format: DL
Live EP	Released: August 29, 2006; Labels: Epic, Interscope; Format: CD

== Singles ==
List of singles, with selected chart positions and certifications, showing year released and album name
Title	Year	Peak chart positions										Certifications	Album
Title	Year	US	US Main.	AUS	CAN	IRL	ITA	NED	NZ	SWE	UK	Certifications	Album
"Cochise"	2002	69	2	—	—	—	33	—	—	—	24	BPI: Silver; RMNZ: Gold	Audioslave
"Like a Stone"	2003	31	1	35	— (Note: "Like a Stone" did not register on the Canadian Singles chart but did reach number 43 on the Canada Digital Song Sales chart.)	—	40	—	14	—	—	RIAA: Gold; ARIA: Gold; BPI: Silver; RMNZ: 4× Platinum	Audioslave
"Show Me How to Live"	2003	67	2	—	—	—	—	—	—	—	—	BPI: Silver; RMNZ: Platinum	Audioslave
"I Am the Highway"	2003	66	2	—	—	—	—	—	36	—	—	RMNZ: Platinum	Audioslave
"What You Are" (promo)	2004	— (Note: "What You Are" did not register on the Billboard Hot 100 but did reach number 25 on the Bubbling Under Hot 100 chart, which acts as an extension to the Hot 100.)	8	—	—	—	—	—	—	—	—		Audioslave
"Be Yourself"	2005	32	1	34	—	48	40	91	38	48	40	RMNZ: Platinum	Out of Exile
"Your Time Has Come"	2005	— (Note: "Your Time Has Come" did not register on the Billboard Hot 100 but did reach number 13 on the Bubbling Under Hot 100 chart, which acts as an extension to the Hot 100.)	12	—	—	—	—	—	—	—	—		Out of Exile
"Doesn't Remind Me"	2005	68	2	—	31	—	—	92	—	—	93	RMNZ: Gold	Out of Exile
"Out of Exile" (airplay)	2005	—	9	—	—	—	—	—	—	—	—		Out of Exile
"Original Fire"	2006	79	4	34	— (Note: "Original Fire" did not register on the Canadian Singles chart but did reach number 15 on the Canada All-format Airplay chart.)	—	—	—	—	—	92		Revelations
"Revelations"	2006	—	6	—	— (Note: "Revelations" did not register on the Canadian Singles chart but did reach number 36 on the Canada All-format Airplay chart.)	—	—	—	—	—	—		Revelations
"—" denotes a release that did not chart or was not issued in that region.

== Other charted songs ==
List of songs, with selected chart positions, showing year released and release name
Title	Year	Peaks		Release
Title	Year	US Act. Rock	US Main.	Release
"We Got the Whip"	2002	39	40	"Cochise"

== Video albums ==
List of video albums, with selected chart positions and certifications
Title	Album details	Peak chart positions						Certifications
Title	Album details	US	AUS	DEN	FIN	SWE	UK	Certifications
Audioslave	Released: July 29, 2003; Labels: Epic, Interscope; Format: DVD	5	9	—	—	—	3	ARIA: 2× Platinum; RIAA: Gold
Live in Cuba	Released: October 11, 2005; Labels: Epic, Interscope; Format: DVD, UMD	1	7	4	4	8	10	MC: 2× Platinum; RIAA: Platinum
"—" denotes a release that did not chart or was not issued in that region.

== Music videos ==
List of music videos, showing year released and director name
Title	Year	Director(s)	Ref.
"Cochise"	2002	Mark Romanek	
"Like a Stone"	2003	Meiert Avis	
"Show Me How to Live"	2003	A/V Club	
"Be Yourself"	2005	Francis Lawrence	
"Your Time Has Come"	2005	Audioslave, Steve Rees	
"Doesn't Remind Me"	2005	Chris Milk	
"Original Fire"	2006	P. R. Brown	
"Revelations"	2006	Danny Clinch	
"One and the Same"	2006	unknown	
"Until We Fall"	2007	unknown	
