= List of songs recorded by Audioslave =

A list of songs recorded by American rock supergroup Audioslave.

== List ==
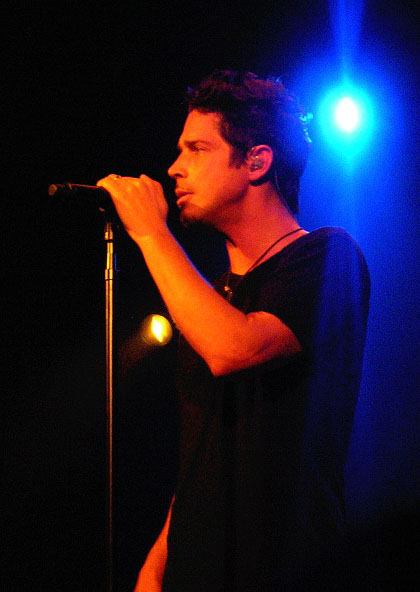
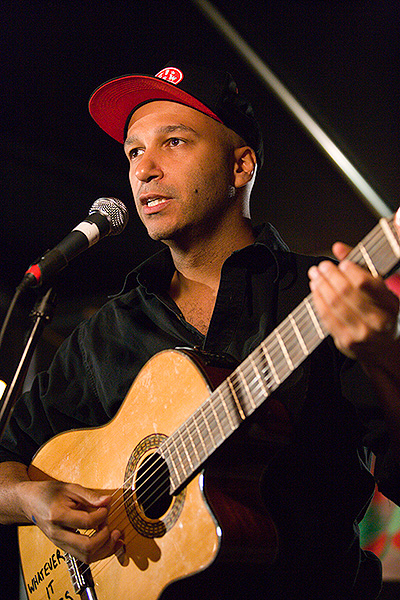
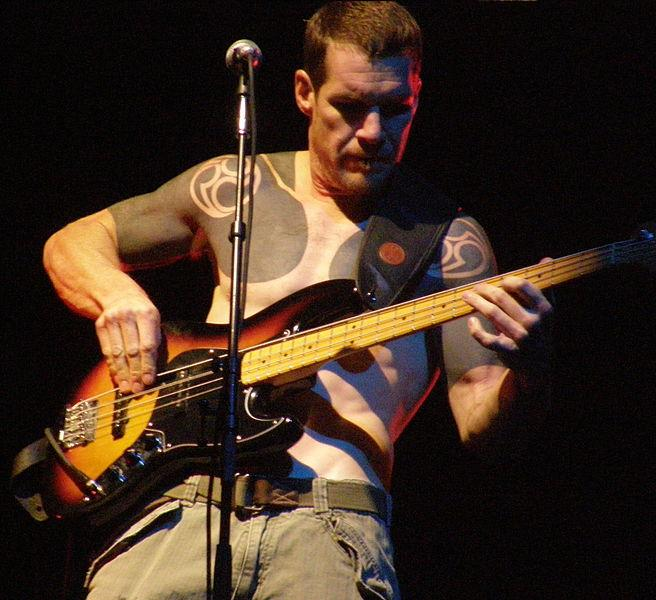
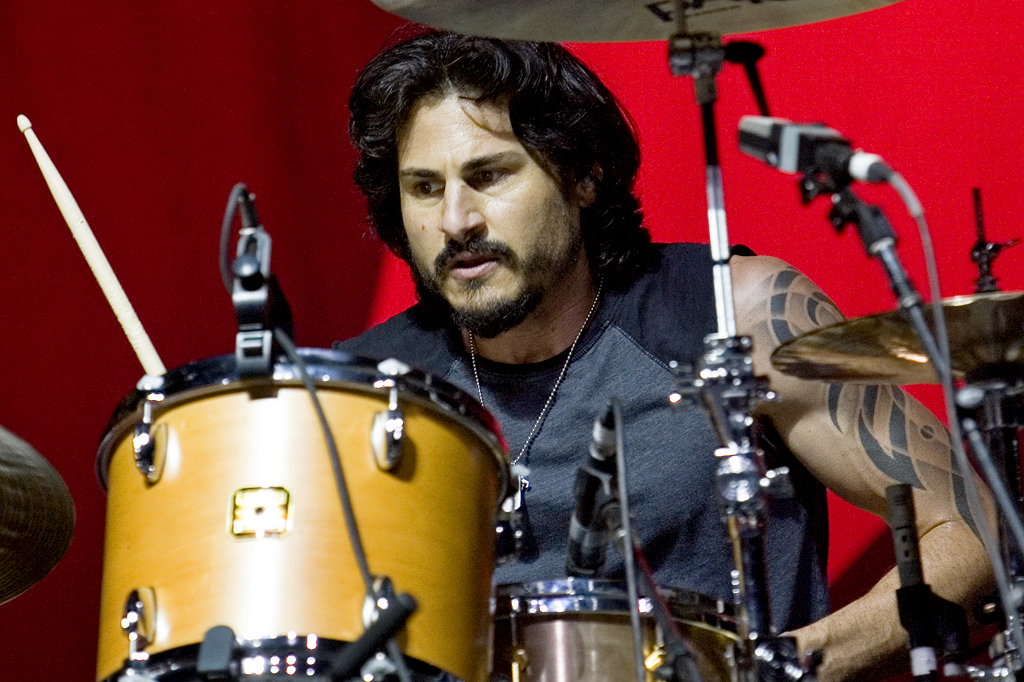
Chris Cornell (first) formed Audioslave in 2001 with former Rage Against the Machine members Tom Morello (second), Tim Commerford (third) and Brad Wilk (fourth). The band released three albums before breaking up in 2007.

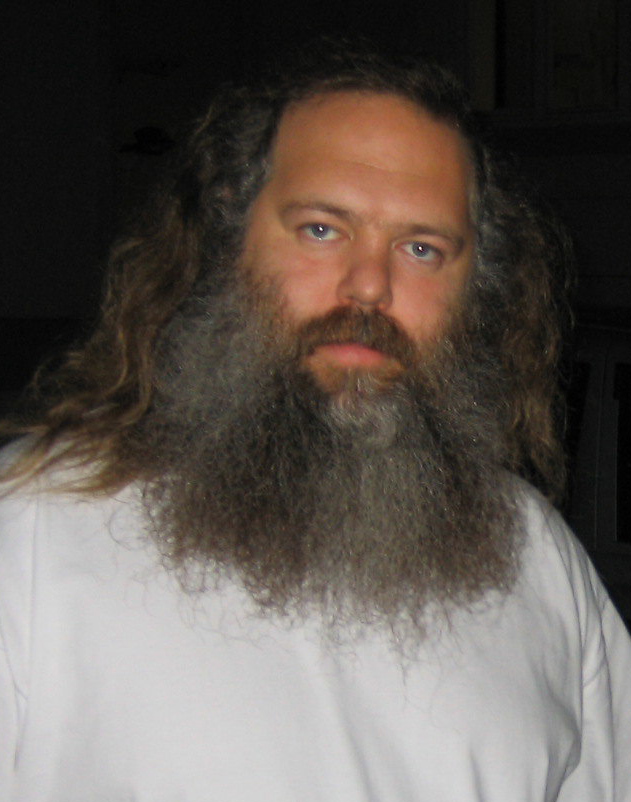
Producer Rick Rubin was the co-producer of Audioslave's first two albums, Audioslave and Out of Exile.

All songs written by Chris Cornell, Tom Morello, Tim Commerford, and Brad Wilk.

Key
†	Indicates song released as a single

Name of song, original release, producer(s), and year of release.
Song	Original release	Producer(s)	Year	Ref.
"#1 Zero"	Out of Exile	Audioslave; Rick Rubin	2005	
"Be Yourself" †	Out of Exile	Audioslave; Rick Rubin	2005	
"Bring Em Back Alive"	Audioslave	Audioslave; Rick Rubin	2002	
"Broken City"	Revelations	Brendan O'Brien	2006	
"Cochise" †	Audioslave	Audioslave; Rick Rubin	2002	
"The Curse"	Out of Exile	Audioslave; Rick Rubin	2005	
"Dandelion"	Out of Exile	Audioslave; Rick Rubin	2005	
"Doesn't Remind Me" †	Out of Exile	Audioslave; Rick Rubin	2005	
"Drown Me Slowly"	Out of Exile	Audioslave; Rick Rubin	2005	
"Exploder"	Audioslave	Audioslave; Rick Rubin	2002	
"Gasoline"	Audioslave	Audioslave; Rick Rubin	2002	
"Getaway Car"	Audioslave	Audioslave; Rick Rubin	2002	
"Give" †	Non-album single	Audioslave; Rick Rubin	2003	
"Heaven's Dead"	Out of Exile	Audioslave; Rick Rubin	2005	
"Hypnotize"	Audioslave	Audioslave; Rick Rubin	2002	
"I Am the Highway" †	Audioslave	Audioslave; Rick Rubin	2002	
"Jewel of the Summertime"	Revelations	Brendan O'Brien	2006	
"The Last Remaining Light"	Audioslave	Audioslave; Rick Rubin	2002	
"Light My Way"	Audioslave	Audioslave; Rick Rubin	2002	
"Like a Stone" †	Audioslave	Audioslave; Rick Rubin	2002	
"Man or Animal"	Out of Exile	Audioslave; Rick Rubin	2005	
"Moth"	Revelations	Brendan O'Brien	2006	
"Nothing Left to Say But Goodbye"	Revelations	Brendan O'Brien	2006	
"One and the Same"	Revelations	Brendan O'Brien	2006	
"Original Fire"	Revelations	Brendan O'Brien	2006	
"Out of Exile" †	Out of Exile	Audioslave; Rick Rubin	2005	
"Revelations" †	Revelations	Brendan O'Brien	2006	
"Set It Off"	Audioslave	Audioslave; Rick Rubin	2002	
"Shadow on the Sun"	Audioslave	Audioslave; Rick Rubin	2002	
"Shape of Things to Come"	Revelations	Brendan O'Brien	2006	
"Show Me How to Live" †	Audioslave	Audioslave; Rick Rubin	2002	
"Somedays"	Revelations	Brendan O'Brien	2006	
"Sound of a Gun"	Revelations	Brendan O'Brien	2006	
"Super Stupid" (Note: "Super Stupid", originally recorded by Funkadelic, was also released as a bonus track on the Japanese edition of Out of Exile.)	Non-album single B-side to "Be Yourself"	Audioslave; Rick Rubin	2005	
"Until We Fall"	Revelations	Brendan O'Brien	2006	
"We Got the Whip"	Non-album single B-side to "Cochise"	Audioslave; Rick Rubin	2002	
"What You Are" †	Audioslave	Audioslave; Rick Rubin	2002	
"Wide Awake"	Revelations	Brendan O'Brien	2006	
"The Worm"	Out of Exile	Audioslave; Rick Rubin	2005	
"Yesterday to Tomorrow"	Out of Exile	Audioslave; Rick Rubin	2005	
"Your Time Has Come" †	Out of Exile	Audioslave; Rick Rubin	2005	
