= Live in Cuba (Audioslave album) =

Video by Audioslave
- Released: October 11, 2005
- Recorded: May 6, 2005
- Genre: Alternative rock, hard rock, post-grunge, heavy metal
- Length: 130:00
- Label: Interscope, Epic
- Director: Lawrence Jordan

Audioslave chronology
Audioslave (2003)	Live in Cuba (2005)

Professional ratings
Review scores
Source	Rating
AllMusic	3.5/5 stars
DVD Review & High Definition	4/5 stars

Live in Cuba is the first live DVD from the American rock supergroup Audioslave. Performed in front of an audience of 70,000 people, Live in Cuba is considered an historic event as it marks one of the few times that American musicians were permitted to play in Cuba. Despite the bureaucratic obstacles resulting from the ongoing United States embargo against Cuba, Audioslave received permission to perform in Havana and altered their tour schedule to play a free concert on May 6, 2005. With special approval by U.S. President George W. Bush and Cuban President Fidel Castro, the concert was organized through joint authorization of the USDT and the Cuban Institute of Music. At the time, guitarist Tom Morello declared that Audioslave was the first American rock and roll band to play a concert in Cuba. However, other American musical artists played in Cuba prior to 2005. At the Havana Jam in March 1979, Billy Joel, Stephen Stills, Weather Report, and several other American pop and jazz artists performed at Havana's Karl Marx Theatre. The Fabulous Titans, an American reggae/ska band, performed in Cuba in 1981.

The DVD consists of footage from the concert held at Havana's Plaza Anti-Imperialista, plus a 37-minute documentary based on Audioslave's experiences in Cuba. The documentary focuses on the band's interactions with the Cuban people and highlights their appreciation of the island's arts and culture. The concert setlist consists mostly of Audioslave songs from the band's first two albums, Audioslave and Out of Exile. However, the band also performs several "Audioslave-ized" versions of songs from Soundgarden ("Spoonman" and "Outshined") and Rage Against the Machine ("Bulls on Parade" and "Sleep Now in the Fire"). After a triumphant concert that included moshing and crowd surfing, Tom Morello stated that Audioslave had "single-handedly demolished the rock and roll blockade against Cuba."

Although the Live in Cuba DVD was released five months after Audioslave's second studio album, Out of Exile, the DVD footage was recorded shortly before the album's May 23, 2005, release date. Because of this timing, the Live in Cuba DVD documents the debut of the track "Heaven's Dead." Two versions of the DVD were released on October 11, 2005, a standard edition and a special edition. The standard edition consists of the DVD only. The special edition includes the DVD and an audio CD of live Sessions@AOL tracks.

== Track listing ==
1. "Set It Off"
2. "Your Time Has Come"
3. "Like a Stone"
4. "Spoonman"*
5. "The Worm"
6. "Gasoline"
7. "Heaven's Dead"*
8. "Doesn't Remind Me"
9. "Be Yourself"
10. "Bulls on Parade" / "Sleep Now in the Fire"
11. "Out of Exile"
12. "Outshined"
13. "Shadow on the Sun"*
14. "Black Hole Sun" (Cornell Acoustic Solo)*
15. "I Am the Highway"
16. "Show Me How to Live"
17. "Cochise"

Note: * indicates tracks exclusive to the Special Edition

=== Special Edition AOL Sessions audio CD ===
1. "Be Yourself"
2. "Loud Love"
3. "Doesn't Remind Me"
4. "Out of Exile"
5. "Sleep Now in the Fire"

== Personnel ==
Audioslave

- Tim Commerford – bass guitar, backing vocals
- Chris Cornell – lead vocals, acoustic guitar
- Tom Morello – lead guitar
- Brad Wilk – drums, percussion

Filmmakers

- Lawrence Jordan – Director
- Bill Martinez – Executive Producer
- Carolina Sanchez – Executive Producer
- Cynthis Semon – Executive Producer
- Jack Gulick – Producer
- Al Masocco – Producer
- Heidi Kelso – Line Producer
- Joseph Sassone – Line Producer (Documentary)
- Daniel E. Catullo – Consulting Producer

Production

- Rick Fagan – Tour Manager
- Robert Long Jr. – Production Manager (Tour)
- Simon Pizey – Head of Production
- Emma Sheldon – Production Manager
- Geoff Frood – Lighting Director
- Toby Francis – Front of House Engineer
- Jerrell Evans – Monitor Engineer
- Jacob Mann – Sound Technician
- Robin Delwiche – Sound Recordist
- Ian Dyckoff – Live Recording Engineer
- Karl Egsieker – Sound Mixer
- Rob Garcia – Sound (Documentary)
- Gabriel Scott – Sound (Documentary)
- Brendan O'Brien – Sound Mixer (Silent Sound Studios)
- Stephen Marcussen – Audio Mastering (Marcussen Mastering)
- Louie Teran – Digital Sound Editor (Marcussen Mastering)
- Martin Richardson – Guitar Technician
- Craig Baker – Bass Guitar Technician
- Bradley Stonner – Drum Technician
- Andrew Veasey - Drum Technician

Cinematography

- Steve Watson – Camera Supervisor
- Felix Andrews – Camera Operator (Documentary)
- Joseph Sassone – Camera Operator (Documentary)
- Mitch Blighe – Camera Operator
- Kess Bohan – Camera Operator
- Alejandro Demetrius – Camera Operator
- Greg Duffield – Camera Operator
- Maxim Ford – Camera Operator
- Philip Millard – Camera Operator
- Adam Rodgers – Camera Operator
- Oliver Russell - Camera Operator
- Phil Walker – Camera Operator
- Nick Wheeler – Camera Operator
- Roger John Berry – Camera Technician
- Aaron Hughes – Camera Technician
- Chris Methven – Camera Technician
- Ronin Novoa – Assistant Camera
- Edgar Pahua – Assistant Camera (Documentary)
- Pablo Trujillo – Assistant Camera (Documentary)

Editorial staff

- Jonathan Covert – Editor
- Buck Huckler – Editor
- Bill Yukich – Editor
- Shawn Dack – Assistant Editor
- Kato Fong – Assistant Editor
- D. B. Robertson – Assistant Editor

== Certifications ==
Certifications and sales for Live in Cuba
Region	Certification	Certified units/sales
Argentina (CAPIF)	Platinum	8,000^{^}
Canada (Music Canada)	2× Platinum	20,000^{^}
United States (RIAA)	Platinum	100,000^{^}
^{^} Shipments figures based on certification alone.
