= Audioslave (video) =

2003 DVD EP by Audioslave

Video by Audioslave
- Released: July 29, 2003
- Recorded: 2002–2003
- Genre: Alternative rock; hard rock; heavy metal
- Length: 30:00
- Label: Interscope/Epic
- Director: Meiert Avis, Mark Romanek
- Producer: Rick Rubin, Audioslave

Audioslave chronology
Audioslave (2003)	Live in Cuba (2005)

Audioslave is an eponymous DVD EP by American rock supergroup Audioslave, released in 2003. It contains the three music videos the band had made up to that point: "Cochise", directed by Mark Romanek, "Like a Stone", directed by Meiert Avis, and "Show Me How to Live", directed by Richard C. Sarafian. After the music videos is a block of material taken from Late Show with David Letterman in New York City on November 25, 2002. This consists of one-on-one interviews and two live performances on a public street ("Set It Off", and "Gasoline"), plus behind-the-scenes footage. The DVD was certified Gold by the RIAA in 2004.

== Chapter listing ==
1. "Cochise"
2. "Like a Stone"
3. "Show Me How to Live"
4. "Set It Off" (live)
5. "Gasoline" (live)

== Personnel ==
- Chris Cornell – vocals
- Tom Morello – guitar
- Tim Commerford – bass guitar, backing vocals (on live performances)
- Brad Wilk – drums

=== Video directors ===
- Meiert Avis
- Mark Romanek
- Richard C. Sarafian

== Certifications and sales ==
Certifications and sales for Audioslave
Region	Certification	Certified units/sales
Australia (ARIA)	2× Platinum	30,000^{^}
United States (RIAA)	Gold	50,000^{^}
^{^} Shipments figures based on certification alone.
