= Live in Cuba =

Live in Cuba may refer to:

- Live in Cuba (Audioslave video album)
- Live in Cuba, album by Jazz at Lincoln Center Orchestra and Wynton Marsalis 2015
- Live in Cuba, album by Ivan Lins

== See also ==
- Made in Cuba, Rick Wakeman
