= List of number-one albums of 2006 (Canada) =

These are the Canadian number-one albums of 2006. The chart is compiled by Nielsen Soundscan and published by Jam! Canoe, issued every Sunday. The chart also appears in Billboard magazine as Top Canadian Albums.

Issue date	Album	Artist
January 7	Curtain Call: The Hits	Eminem
January 14	Curtain Call: The Hits	Eminem
January 21	Curtain Call: The Hits	Eminem
January 28	Curtain Call: The Hits	Eminem
February 4	Curtain Call: The Hits	Eminem
February 11	Back to Bedlam	James Blunt
February 18	Back to Bedlam	James Blunt
February 25	Sing-A-Longs and Lullabies for the Film Curious George	Jack Johnson
March 4	Sing-A-Longs and Lullabies for the Film Curious George	Jack Johnson
March 11	Sing-A-Longs and Lullabies for the Film Curious George	Jack Johnson
March 18	Sing-A-Longs and Lullabies for the Film Curious George	Jack Johnson
March 25	Back to Bedlam	James Blunt
April 1	Back to Bedlam	James Blunt
April 8	La Forêt des Mal-Aimés	Pierre Lapointe
April 15	Back to Bedlam	James Blunt
April 22	Back to Bedlam	James Blunt
April 29	Back to Bedlam	James Blunt
May 6	Back to Bedlam	James Blunt
May 13	A Girl Like Me	Rihanna
May 20	10,000 Days	Tool
May 27	Stadium Arcadium	Red Hot Chili Peppers
June 3	Stadium Arcadium	Red Hot Chili Peppers
June 10	Taking the Long Way	Dixie Chicks
June 17	Taking the Long Way	Dixie Chicks
June 24	Taking the Long Way	Dixie Chicks
July 1	Taking the Long Way	Dixie Chicks
July 8	Loose	Nelly Furtado
July 15	Billy Talent II	Billy Talent
July 22	Billy Talent II	Billy Talent
July 29	Billy Talent II	Billy Talent
August 5	Loose	Nelly Furtado
August 12	Crazy Frog Presents More Crazy Hits	Crazy Frog
August 19	Crazy Frog Presents More Crazy Hits	Crazy Frog
August 26	Crazy Frog Presents More Crazy Hits	Crazy Frog
September 2	Back to Basics	Christina Aguilera
September 9	Crisis	Alexisonfire
September 16	Modern Times	Bob Dylan
September 23	Revelations	Audioslave
September 30	FutureSex/LoveSounds	Justin Timberlake
October 7	From This Moment On	Diana Krall
October 14	Duets: An American Classic	Tony Bennett
October 21	Sam's Town	The Killers
October 28	Still the Same… Great Rock Classics of Our Time	Rod Stewart
November 4	I Think of You	Gregory Charles
November 11	I Think of You	Gregory Charles
November 18	I Think of You	Gregory Charles
November 25	Awake	Josh Groban
December 2	Awake	Josh Groban
December 9	Love	The Beatles
December 16	The Christmas Collection	Il Divo
December 23	The Christmas Collection	Il Divo
December 30	The Christmas Collection	Il Divo

== See also ==
- List of Canadian number-one singles of 2006
