= List of number-one albums of 2005 (Canada) =

These are the Canadian number-one albums of 2005. The chart is compiled by Nielsen Soundscan and published by Jam! Canoe, issued every Sunday. The chart also appears in Billboard magazine as Top Canadian Albums.

Issue date	Album	Artist
January 1	Greatest Hits	Shania Twain
January 8	Greatest Hits	Shania Twain
January 15	Encore	Eminem
January 22	American Idiot	Green Day
January 29	American Idiot	Green Day
February 5	American Idiot	Green Day
February 12	American Idiot	Green Day
February 19	American Idiot	Green Day
February 26	American Idiot	Green Day
March 5	American Idiot	Green Day
March 12	American Idiot	Green Day
March 19	The Massacre	50 Cent
March 26	The Massacre	50 Cent
April 2	The Massacre	50 Cent
April 9	The Massacre	50 Cent
April 16	The Massacre	50 Cent
April 23	The Massacre	50 Cent
April 30	The Massacre	50 Cent
May 7	Il Divo	Il Divo
May 14	Il Divo	Il Divo
May 21	Il Divo	Il Divo
May 28	Make Believe	Weezer
June 4	Mezmerize	System of a Down
June 11	Out of Exile	Audioslave
June 18	Il Divo	Il Divo
June 25	X&Y	Coldplay
July 2	X&Y	Coldplay
July 9	X&Y	Coldplay
July 16	Monkey Business	The Black Eyed Peas
July 23	Monkey Business	The Black Eyed Peas
July 30	Monkey Business	The Black Eyed Peas
August 6	Monkey Business	The Black Eyed Peas
August 13	Monkey Business	The Black Eyed Peas
August 20	Monkey Business	The Black Eyed Peas
August 27	Monkey Business	The Black Eyed Peas
September 3	Most Wanted	Hilary Duff
September 10	Most Wanted	Hilary Duff
September 17	Late Registration	Kanye West
September 24	A Bigger Bang	Rolling Stones
October 1	Late Registration	Kanye West
October 8	Have a Nice Day	Bon Jovi
October 15	Wildflower	Sheryl Crow
October 22	All the Right Reasons	Nickelback
October 29	All the Right Reasons	Nickelback
November 5	All the Right Reasons	Nickelback
November 12	All the Right Reasons	Nickelback
November 19	Star Academie 2005	Various Artists
November 26	Ancora	Il Divo
December 3	Confessions on a Dance Floor	Madonna
December 10	Hypnotize	System of a Down
December 17	Ancora	Il Divo
December 24	Curtain Call: The Hits	Eminem
December 31	Curtain Call: The Hits	Eminem

== See also ==
- List of number-one singles of 2005 (Canada)
