= Original Fire =

Single by Audioslave

from the album Revelations
- Released: July 17, 2006
- Recorded: 2006
- Genre: Funk metal; Alternative metal
- Length: 3:35
- Label: Epic; Interscope
- Songwriters: Brad Wilk; Chris Cornell; Tim Commerford; Tom Morello
- Producer: Brendan O'Brien

Audioslave singles chronology
"Doesn't Remind Me" (2005)	"Original Fire" (2006)	"Revelations" (2006)

Music video
- "Original Fire" on YouTube

Audio sample
- file; help

"Original Fire" is a song by American hard rock band Audioslave. It was released in July 2006 as the first single from the album Revelations.

Over a year and a half after release, the song rose back into the UK Rock Chart, at number 11, and a week later climbed to the top 10 at number 6. It was also a substantial rock hit in the U.S., peaking at number 3 on the Modern Rock Tracks chart and number 4 on the Mainstream Rock Tracks chart, although it did not chart for several months.

== Background ==
Guitarist Tom Morello described the song as hard-rocking, but with a '70s funk and soul influence. "It's a jam," he said. "It's one of those songs where the genesis was a riff that I had for a very, very long time and imagined it happening in a certain way. When we started jamming in the room, the song morphed into something completely different, completely unexpected and a lot better than I ever imagined it being."

== Promotion ==
Epic Records held a contest in which the participants had to identify all of the icons shown in the video (there was a list of names and silhouettes given and you had to match them) and they had the chance to win copy of the album Revelations, as well as a guitar signed by the band.

== Track listing ==
=== CD version ===
1. "Original Fire" (album version)
2. "Set It Off" (live at the Quart Festival)
3. "Gasoline" (live at the Quart Festival)

=== 7" vinyl ===
1. "Original Fire" (album version)
2. "Doesn't Remind Me" (live at the Quart Festival)

== Monkey house guitar solo ==
"Original Fire" has a strange guitar solo that Tom Morello describes as "monkey laughter." He performs this solo by setting his DOD Equalizer, deploying his wah-wah pedal, depressing his whammy bar to make the strings slack and slapping the strings against the pickups, although, as shown in the music video, the same effect can be achieved by rapidly loosening and tightening the tuning peg if the guitar does not have a whammy bar. Tom later went on to jokingly describe the solo as an "ATROCITY".

== Music video ==
A music video for "Original Fire" was also shot, and premiered on Yahoo! Music. The video was directed by Paul R. Brown (who was the director of videos for bands like Stone Sour, Otep and Mötley Crüe) and reflected on the lyrics of the song, "The original fire has died and gone, but the riot inside moves on." It featured the band playing with images of figures that are inspirational to the band, such as Johnny Cash, Martin Luther King Jr., Che Guevara, Chuck D, the Clash, Bob Dylan, Wendy O. Williams, Peter Tosh, Jello Biafra, Bill Hicks, Lenny Bruce, Jim Morrison, the Million Man March, Andy Warhol, Ozzy Osbourne, Janis Joplin, Joey Ramone, Randy Rhoads, Malcolm X, Glenn Danzig, Sonic Youth, Iggy Pop and Nelson Mandela. "The video, in some ways, is about the thread of music and cultural figures with integrity that were important parts of our history – how all those streams flow together to where we are today," Morello explained.

== Charts ==
=== Weekly charts ===
Weekly chart performance for "Original Fire"
Chart (2006)	Peak position
Australia (ARIA)	34
Canada All-format Airplay (Billboard)	15
Canada Rock (Billboard)	1
Scotland Singles (OCC)	92
UK Singles (OCC)	92
UK Rock & Metal (OCC)	4
US Billboard Hot 100	79
US Alternative Airplay (Billboard)	3
US Mainstream Rock (Billboard)	4

=== Year-end charts ===
Year-end chart performance for "Original Fire"
Chart (2006)	Position
US Mainstream Rock Songs (Billboard)	27
