= Revelations (Audioslave album) =

Studio album by Audioslave
- Released: September 4, 2006
- Recorded: 2005–2006
- Studios: Atlanta, Georgia; Henson, Hollywood
- Genres: Hard rock; alternative rock; alternative metal; post-grunge
- Length: 48:28
- Labels: Epic; Interscope
- Producer: Brendan O'Brien

Audioslave chronology
Out of Exile (2005)	Revelations (2006)

Singles from Revelations
- 1. "Original Fire" Released: July 17, 2006; 2. "Revelations" Released: November 2006

Revelations is the third and final studio album by American rock supergroup Audioslave, released on September 4, 2006 internationally and a day later in the United States through Epic Records and Interscope Records. Chris Cornell quit the band in February 2007 and the remaining members disbanded Audioslave rather than looking for a new vocalist since they were busy with a reunion of Rage Against the Machine.

== Background and recording ==
According to guitarist Tom Morello, most of the 20 songs that Audioslave brought to the studio for possible inclusion on Revelations had been written before the band went on their most recent U.S. tour, so they were able to "[work] out the kinks of some of these songs in front of a live audience". Many of the songs incorporate 1960s and '70s soul and funk influences that were new for the band, with Morello saying the album "sounds like Led Zeppelin meets Earth, Wind & Fire", and Chris Cornell referring to his new "Seventies funk and R&B-flavor vocals." The song "Wide Awake" was written to criticize the Bush administration's response to Hurricane Katrina. The band had completed recording the album when producer Brendan O'Brien requested one more song to close it, so they wrote and recorded "Moth" the next day, making it the last song Audioslave made together; in it, Chris Cornell sings: "I won't fly around your fire anymore".

While promoting the album, Morello stated in an interview that "Revelations is the first record [Cornell] didn't smoke, drink or take drugs through the recording." However, he later clarified that "Chris was stone sober during the making of our Out of Exile album. Chris was also sober during the making of Revelations and prior to recording he gave up smoking as well. I apologize for any confusion or concern that was stirred up by the original article. Sobriety can be a matter of life or death and Chris' courage in maintaining his health for years has been an inspiration."

After leaving the studio, Audioslave went on hiatus to allow Cornell to complete "You Know My Name", the theme song for the 2006 James Bond film Casino Royale, and Morello to pursue his own solo work under the moniker of the Nightwatchman. In July 2006, Cornell denied that his work on a new solo album meant he planned to quit Audioslave, saying: "We hear rumors that Audioslave is breaking up all the time ... I always just ignore it." The band never toured behind Revelations, however, and on February 15, 2007, Cornell officially announced his departure from the group in a statement that read: "Due to irresolvable personality conflicts as well as musical differences, I am permanently leaving the band Audioslave. I wish the other three members nothing but the best in all of their future endeavors." The other three members were busy in 2007 with a reunion of Rage Against the Machine and Morello and Cornell each released a solo album that year, so Audioslave officially disbanded. As a result, most of the songs on Revelations were never performed live by the band, except for those that were debuted live prior to recording the album: "One and the Same", "Wide Awake", "Original Fire", and "Sound of a Gun".

== Promotion ==
On July 3, 2006, a private listening party was held for fan club members and non-fan club contest winners. The album received a strong fan review that noted the album's darker tone and anthemic choruses.

Prior to the release of the album, the songs "Wide Awake" and "Shape of Things to Come" were prominently featured in Michael Mann's 2006 film Miami Vice, and the title track appeared in the video game Madden NFL 07. The marketing campaign also included getting the fictional nation from the album art, dubbed "Audioslave Nation", featured on Google Earth for a time.

"Original Fire" was released as a single seven weeks before the album, and "Revelations" was released as a single two months after the album.

== Reception ==
Professional ratings
Aggregate scores
Source	Rating
Metacritic	60/100
Review scores
Source	Rating
AllMusic	4/5 stars
Blender	3.5/5 stars
Encyclopedia of Popular Music	3/5 stars
Entertainment Weekly	B
Now	3/5 stars
PopMatters	6/10
Q	4/5 stars
Rolling Stone	3/5 stars
The Skinny	3/5 stars
Slant Magazine	3/5 stars

"Original Fire" (2006)
The first single from Revelations, inspired by the Seattle music scene.

=== Critical ===
The album received mixed reviews, earning a score of 60 out of 100 on Metacritic based on 15 reviews. Rolling Stone wrote: "Most of these twelve tracks are impressive structures with periodic highs ... that never resolve into songs."

=== Commercial ===
Revelations was released in the U.S.A. on September 5, 2006. It sold 150,631 copies in its first week of release, debuting at #2 on the Billboard 200 chart. The album has been certified gold in the U.S.A. (for shipment of 500,000 units), Canada (for shipment of 50,000 units), Australia (for shipment of 35,000 units, which occurred in its first week of release), and New Zealand (for shipment of 7,500 units, which occurred its first week), and it has sold nearly 1 million copies worldwide.

== Track listing ==
All lyrics written by Chris Cornell, all music composed by Audioslave.

Revelations track listing
No.	Title	Length
1.	"Revelations"	4:12
2.	"One and the Same"	3:38
3.	"Sound of a Gun"	4:20
4.	"Until We Fall"	3:50
5.	"Original Fire"	3:38
6.	"Broken City"	3:48
7.	"Somedays"	3:33
8.	"Shape of Things to Come"	4:34
9.	"Jewel of the Summertime"	3:53
10.	"Wide Awake"	4:26
11.	"Nothing Left to Say but Goodbye"	3:32
12.	"Moth"	4:57
Total length:		48:28

Japanese bonus tracks
No.	Title	Length
13.	"Set It Off" (live at the Quart Festival)	4:25
14.	"Doesn't Remind Me" (live at the Quart Festival)	4:50
15.	"Gasoline" (live at the Quart Festival)	5:34
16.	"Out of Exile" (live at the Quart Festival)	5:04

iTunes bonus tracks
No.	Title	Length
13.	"Show Me How to Live" (live at the Quart Festival)	5:02

Note

- The lyrics of the bridge of "Sound of a Gun" were also used in the background during the bridge of "Drown Me Slowly" from Audioslave's previous album Out of Exile.

=== Special edition ===
A Special edition of the album was released that included a DVD with a 16-minute film directed by Danny Clinch. The film featured interviews with the band members and some performance footage.

== Personnel ==
Audioslave

- Chris Cornell – lead and backing vocals
- Tim Commerford – bass guitar
- Brad Wilk – drums
- Tom Morello – guitars

Production and design

- Produced and mixed by Brendan O'Brien
- Recorded by Nick DiDia
- Additional engineering by Billy Bowers; Assisted by Tom Syrowski and Matt Serrechio
- Band technicians: Bobby Schneck and Pete Lewis
- Mastered by Bob Ludwig
- Art direction by Brandy Flower
- Album cover by P.R. Brown
- Band photography by Danny Clinch

== Charts ==
=== Weekly charts ===
Weekly chart performance for Revelations
Chart (2006)	Peak position
Australian Albums (ARIA)	1
Austrian Albums (Ö3 Austria)	6
Belgian Albums (Ultratop Flanders)	52
Belgian Alternative Albums (Ultratop Flanders)	32
Belgian Albums (Ultratop Wallonia)	70
Canadian Albums (Billboard)	1
Croatian International Albums (HDU)	7
Danish Albums (Hitlisten)	6
Dutch Albums (Album Top 100)	21
Finnish Albums (Suomen virallinen lista)	2
French Albums (SNEP)	46
German Albums (Offizielle Top 100)	8
Irish Albums (IRMA)	7
Italian Albums (FIMI)	12
New Zealand Albums (RMNZ)	1
Norwegian Albums (VG-lista)	5
Polish Albums (ZPAV)	25
Portuguese Albums (AFP)	22
Scottish Albums (Official Charts)	10
Spanish Albums (Promusicae)	28
Swedish Albums (Sverigetopplistan)	6
Swiss Albums (Schweizer Hitparade)	8
UK Albums (Official Charts)	12
UK Rock & Metal Albums (Official Charts)	1
US Billboard 200	2
US Top Rock Albums (Billboard)	1

=== Year-end charts ===
Year-end chart performance for Revelations
Chart (2006)	Position
US Billboard 200	197

== Certifications ==
Certifications for Revelations
Region	Certification	Certified units/sales
Australia (ARIA)	Gold	35,000^{^}
Canada (Music Canada)	Gold	50,000^{^}
New Zealand (RMNZ)	Gold	7,500^{^}
United Kingdom (BPI)	Silver	60,000^{*}
United States (RIAA)	Gold	500,000^{^}
^{*} Sales figures based on certification alone.^{^} Shipments figures based on certification alone.

== See also ==
- List of number-one albums of 2006 (Australia)
- List of number-one albums of 2006 (Canada)
- List of number-one albums in 2006 (New Zealand)
