= Revelations (Audioslave song) =

Single by Audioslave

from the album Revelations
- Released: November 2006
- Recorded: 2006
- Genre: Hard rock; funk metal
- Length: 4:12
- Label: Epic
- Songwriters: Brad Wilk; Chris Cornell; Tim Commerford; Tom Morello
- Producer: Brendan O'Brien

Audioslave singles chronology
| "Original Fire" (2006) | "Revelations" (2006) |

Music video
- "Revelations" on YouTube

"Revelations" is a song by American rock supergroup Audioslave. It was released in November 2006 as the second and final single from their third album Revelations and also the final single of their career.

== Content ==
Musically, the song begins with a unique, dreamy, slightly flanged arpeggio that is unusual for Tom Morello. After a repeat of the arpeggio, the main riff of the song crashes in accompanied by drums and bass. Tom's solo once again invokes the toggle switch technique, with one handed tapping in the left hand that creates a hectic array of notes which seem to bounce off each other before entering the closing bridge of the solo, where Morello's DigiTech Whammy pedal is put into full force.

== Music video ==
The video premiered in November 2006, and simply shows the band playing the song with no added dramatics or effects. The video begins with various band members playing their instrument in front of a camera shoot. When the vocals begin, a split-screen of Chris Cornell and other band members begins. As each guitar riff or drum part kicks in, the player of that instrument gets their few seconds in front of the camera. During Tom Morello's guitar solo, the camera largely goes between him and drummer Brad Wilk, but still with a few shots of Cornell and bassist Tim Commerford. The video also clearly shows Morello playing a Gibson Les Paul that formerly had a Budweiser logo on it; Morello promptly burned the logo off in refusal for his guitar to be used as an advertisement. During Cornell's vocal solo after Morello's guitar solo, the camera's tint turns to a blue color, before reverting to its original color for the final chorus. The video ends with a scene of Cornell's microphone hanging alone from the ceiling.

== Charts ==
=== Peak positions ===
| Chart (2006) | Peak position |
|---|---|
| Canada All-format Airplay (Billboard) | 36 |
| Canada Rock (Billboard) | 4 |
| US Alternative Airplay (Billboard) | 38 |
| US Mainstream Rock (Billboard) | 6 |
