= What You Are (Audioslave song) =

Promotional single by Audioslave

from the album Audioslave
- Released: March 2, 2004
- Recorded: 2002
- Length: 4:09
- Label: Epic
- Songwriters: Tom Morello; Chris Cornell; Tim Commerford; Brad Wilk
- Producer: Rick Rubin

Audioslave singles chronology
"I Am the Highway" (2004)	"What You Are" (2004)	"Be Yourself" (2005)

"What You Are" is a song by American rock band Audioslave. It was released in March 2004 as the fifth and final single from their self-titled debut. It peaked at number 17 on the U.S. Modern Rock Tracks chart. The song's meaning is described as being a way to ditch an "evil woman". The song was also used in a TV spot for the movie Spider-Man 2.

== Charts ==
=== Weekly charts ===
Weekly chart performance for "What You Are"
Chart (2004)	Peak position
US Bubbling Under Hot 100 (Billboard)	25
US Alternative Airplay (Billboard)	17
US Mainstream Rock (Billboard)	8

=== Year-end charts ===
Year-end chart performance for "What You Are"
Chart (2004)	Position
US Modern Rock Tracks (Billboard)	75
