= We Will Reign =

Studio album by the Last Internationale
- Released: August 19, 2014
- Genre: Hard rock
- Length: 36:46
- Label: Epic
- Producer: Brendan O'Brien

The Last Internationale chronology
Choose Your Killer (2011)	We Will Reign (2014)	TLI Unplugged (2017)

We Will Reign is the debut studio album by American rock band the Last Internationale, released on August 19, 2014 by Epic Records.

== Reception ==
AllMusic's Mark Deming wrote that the "fierce folk-punk attack of their earliest work has been replaced with a beefy but more generic hard rock growl with a rootsy edge", and that "those who were hoping that We Will Reign would live up to the rabble-rousing standards of the Last Internationale's early work are likely to be let down". Louder Than War's Dave Jennings wrote that the album "is power-soaked, hard hitting and in the best traditions of the punk and rock influences of New York City. More than that however, the Last Internationale manage to weave a strong thread of their folk and protest influences throughout the album that, combined with the potency of the sound, create shock-waves that will resonate for some time to come."

== Track listing ==
No.	Title	Length
1.	"Life, Liberty, and the Pursuit of Indian Blood"	3:42
2.	"We Will Reign"	2:57
3.	"Wanted Man"	5:01
4.	"Killing Fields"	4:32
5.	"Battleground"	3:00
6.	"Baby It's You"	3:25
7.	"Devil's Dust"	3:35
8.	"I'll Be Alright"	3:27
9.	"Fire"	3:40
10.	"1968"	3:25

== Personnel ==
- Delila Paz – vocals
- Edgey Pires – guitar
- Brad Wilk – drums
- Brendan O'Brien – producer
- Bill Ayers – liner notes
