= Be Yourself (Audioslave song) =

2005 single by Audioslave

Single by Audioslave

from the album Out of Exile
- B-side: "Super Stupid"
- Released: March 14, 2005
- Genre: Alternative rock
- Length: 4:39
- Label: Interscope; Epic
- Songwriters: Brad Wilk; Chris Cornell; Tim Commerford; Tom Morello
- Producer: Rick Rubin

Audioslave singles chronology
"What You Are" (2004)	"Be Yourself" (2005)	"Your Time Has Come" (2005)

Music video
- "Be Yourself" on YouTube

Audio sample
- file; help

"Be Yourself" is the first single from American rock band Audioslave's second studio album, Out of Exile (2005). The song was released in March 2005 and topped the US Billboard Mainstream Rock Tracks chart for seven weeks, as well as the Billboard Modern Rock Tracks chart for four weeks. Worldwide, the song entered the top 50 in multiple countries.

== Song meaning ==
The lyrics were inspired by events from the frontman's, Chris Cornell's, own life. "The 'be yourself' part really just came from a lot of things that I've gone through in my life and a lot of different changes and all the different tragedies and all the horrendously stupid mistakes I've made in my personal life, and wanting to be able to make up for those things and wanting to be able to not be ashamed, all that stuff," he explained. "You know, that's the one thing about getting older that's better, and this song kinda says it so simply, to a degree that 10 years ago I would've been embarrassed to put it in a song 'cause it is so simple. But there it is."

== Music video ==
The music video was filmed in an old hotel in downtown Los Angeles and directed by Francis Lawrence. It largely consists of footage of the band performing the song in a dark, isolated room with large windows. During the last chorus, lights in the background flash colors of red. Cornell has said that the band modeled the concept after the Beatles' film Let It Be. He said: "If you watch Let It Be, the look of the film makes the band look like it's an important happening. I just wanted to look important, like things looked when I was a child."

== Track listings ==
1. "Be Yourself" – 4:38
2. "Like a Stone" (live version)
3. "Show Me How to Live" (remix by T-Ray) – 4:48
4. "Be Yourself" (video) – 4:48

Imported version

1. "Be Yourself" – 4:38
2. "Super Stupid" (Funkadelic cover) – 3:24
3. "Show Me How to Live" (remix by T-Ray) – 4:48
4. "Be Yourself" (video) – 4:48

Vinyl

A. "Be Yourself" – 4:38
B. "Super Stupid" (Funkadelic cover) – 3:24

== Charts ==
=== Weekly charts ===
Weekly chart performance for "Be Yourself"
Chart (2005–2006)	Peak position
Australia (ARIA)	34
Austria (Ö3 Austria Top 40)	73
Canada Rock Top 30 (Radio & Records)	1
France (SNEP)	74
Germany (GfK)	87
Ireland (IRMA)	48
Italy (FIMI)	40
Netherlands (Single Top 100)	91
New Zealand (Recorded Music NZ)	38
Scotland Singles (Official Charts)	34
Sweden (Sverigetopplistan)	48
UK Singles (Official Charts)	40
UK Rock & Metal (Official Charts)	4
US Billboard Hot 100	32
US Adult Alternative Airplay (Billboard)	9
US Alternative Airplay (Billboard)	1
US Mainstream Rock (Billboard)	1

=== Year-end charts ===
Year-end chart performance for "Be Yourself"
Chart (2005)	Position
US Mainstream Rock Tracks (Billboard)	10
US Modern Rock Tracks (Billboard)	14
US Triple-A (Billboard)	31

== Certifications ==
Certifications for "Be Yourself"
Region	Certification	Certified units/sales
Brazil (Pro-Música Brasil)	Platinum	60,000^{‡}
New Zealand (RMNZ)	Platinum	30,000^{‡}
^{‡} Sales+streaming figures based on certification alone.

== Release history ==
Release and formats for "Be Yourself"
Region	Date	Format(s)	Label(s)	Ref.
United States	March 14, 2005	Modern rock radio	Interscope; Epic	
Australia	May 30, 2005	CD	Interscope	
United Kingdom	June 6, 2005	7-inch vinyl; CD	Interscope; Epic	
