= The Last Internationale =

American rock band

- Origin: New York City, New York, U.S.
- Genre: Rock
- Years active: 2008–present
- Labels: Independent, Epic
- Members: Delila Paz; Edgey Pires

The Last Internationale (TLI) is an American rock band formed by New York City guitarist Edgey Pires and vocalist Delila Paz.

The group is known for its socially-conscious lyrics and strong live performances. Ben Hugues at Uber Rock says that "Live, they are an explosive ball of energy with perfect soulful vocals from Delila and rock 'n' roll chaos from the fingers of Edgey, a man who literally rips the strings from his guitar on a nightly basis." The duo started writing protest song and playing small gigs when Pires was studying for a degree in political science. He mentions Howlin' Wolf, Bob Dylan, Pete Seeger, Buffy Sainte-Marie and Woody Guthrie among their musical influences.

The group can get very political, with songs about the situation of the First Nations in the United States, war, working class poverty and the abuse of power. A streak of hope runs through the revolutionary lyrics. Says Pires: "The point of the song Life, Liberty and the Pursuit of Indian Blood, is that ultimately it will be the youth who free society, whether it’s the inner child in us or the actual youth who just get so sick of this whole mess that we’re in. The American Revolution was supposed to liberate people and it just ended up oppressing many for hundreds of years after and the song is about how the youth are going to take all the risks and ultimately take over. We’re promoting total liberation and we can achieve it in our lifetime, that’s optimistic!" Paz has always been an environmentalist: "Very early in my life, I think grade school. I started getting involved with Greenpeace and environmental causes around 3rd grade. I knew that we weren’t living in a very natural way. I used to get little kid books that were about indigenous cultures and felt that we should live as nomads."

In January 2013, they released a 5-song EP titled New York, I Do Mind Dying. Rage Against the Machine guitarist Tom Morello introduced the band to his bandmate, drummer Brad Wilk, who subsequently joined the band between 2014 and 2015. Their debut album, We Will Reign, was released on August 19, 2014. The album was produced by Brendan O'Brien and Brendan Benson. That was to be their last production with Epic Records (a Sony label), with which they broke to preserve their editorial independence.

The band made their network television debut on August 27, 2014, playing "Life, Liberty and the Pursuit of Indian Blood" on the Late Show with David Letterman. They opened for Robert Plant in the fall of 2014 to support his Lullaby and... The Ceaseless Roar tour.

In 2015, they joined the Who on the European leg of their The Who Hits 50 tour.

Bootleg Kills... Vol. 1, released in 2016, is a mostly acoustic collection of covers, outtakes and other bits and pieces.

Soul on Fire was independently produced and released in February 2019. Anthony Kozlowski of Atwood Magazine calls it "capital “R” rawk announcing itself boldly and viciously. It was meant to be heard among this mass of humanity, channeling collective frustration into gritted teeth and stomping feet. Raise your glass and knock it back."

== Discography ==
=== Studio albums ===
- The Last Internationale (2008)
- Choose Your Killer (2011)
- We Will Reign (2014)
- TLI Unplugged (2017)
- Soul on Fire (2019)
- Running for a Dream (2023)
- Road To Freedom (2026)

=== Live albums ===
- This Bootleg Kills... Vol 1 (2016)
- This Bootleg Kills... Pop Stars Vol II (2017)
- Live at Doghouse Studios (2017)
- Live at Arda Recorders (2020)

=== Extended plays ===
- New York, I Do Mind Dying (2013)
- Life, Liberty and the Pursuit of Indian Blood (2013)
