= I Am the Highway =

Single by Audioslave

from the album Audioslave
- Released: September 16, 2003
- Recorded: 2002
- Genre: Alternative rock
- Length: 5:35
- Label: Epic; Interscope
- Songwriters: Tom Morello; Chris Cornell; Tim Commerford; Brad Wilk
- Producer: Rick Rubin

Audioslave singles chronology
"Show Me How to Live" (2003)	"I Am the Highway" (2003)	"What You Are" (2004)

Audio sample
- "I Am the Highway": file; help

"I Am the Highway" is a song by the American rock supergroup Audioslave. It was released in September 2003 as the fourth single from their eponymous 2002 debut studio album Audioslave. It reached number 66 on the Billboard Hot 100 in 2004, number 2 on the Mainstream Rock Tracks chart and number 3 on the Modern Rock Tracks chart.

The song title was used as the name of the 2019 memorial concert for Chris Cornell.

== Track listing ==
1. "I Am the Highway" – 5:35

== Charts ==
=== Weekly charts ===
2003–2004 weekly chart performance for "I Am the Highway"
Chart (2003–2004)	Peak position
Canada Rock Top 30 (Radio & Records)	19
New Zealand (Recorded Music NZ)	36
US Billboard Hot 100	66
US Alternative Airplay (Billboard)	3
US Mainstream Rock (Billboard)	2

2017 weekly chart performance for "I Am the Highway"
Chart (2017)	Peak position
US Hot Rock & Alternative Songs (Billboard)	19

=== Year-end charts ===
Year-end chart performance for "I Am the Highway"
Chart (2004)	Position
US Mainstream Rock Tracks (Billboard)	12
US Modern Rock Tracks (Billboard)	22

== Certifications ==
Certifications for "I Am the Highway"
Region	Certification	Certified units/sales
New Zealand (RMNZ)	Platinum	30,000^{‡}
^{‡} Sales+streaming figures based on certification alone.
