= Your Time Has Come =

Single by Audioslave

from the album Out of Exile
- Released: May 3, 2005
- Length: 4:15
- Label: Interscope
- Songwriters: Brad Wilk; Chris Cornell; Tim Commerford; Tom Morello
- Producer: Rick Rubin

Audioslave singles chronology
"Be Yourself" (2005)	"Your Time Has Come" (2005)	"Doesn't Remind Me" (2005)

Music video
- "Your Time Has Come" on YouTube

"Your Time Has Come" is a song by the American hard rock band Audioslave. It was released in May 2005 as the second single from their second album Out of Exile.

== Song meaning ==
The song was inspired by the 1980s song "People Who Died," by The Jim Carroll Band, an emotional salute to the casualties of New York drug culture written by poet and singer Jim Carroll, who also wrote the autobiographical The Basketball Diaries. As Chris Cornell explained: "It's a bunch of references to people that I knew that ... were younger than me who've been dead for years and years, up to a couple of years ago."it is also about people who killed themselves before their time has come."

The lyrics also make a reference to the Vietnam Veterans Memorial. ("...I've seen fifty-thousand names all engraved on a stone..."). As Cornell has put it: "And then just kind of that juxtaposition of, even though it seems a lot for one person, a young healthy person, to have lost all these friends through various means of stupidity and other things, then making reference to the Vietnam War Memorial and the sheer numbers of dead. And remembering that and pointing out that each one of them has a family, each one of them has friends that are sitting around thinking about the same stuff that I did. But the numbers are astounding and, in a sense, kind of criminal. And that's what the song's about."

== Music video ==
The music video for the song consists of powerful scenes from their free live show in Cuba, which was the first time a rock band from the U.S. played in Cuba. It was held in May 2005, and a DVD also came out about this concert. Besides the concert footage moments from the life of Audioslave can be seen in the video (the band on the road, giving interviews, etc.).

== Charts ==
=== Weekly charts ===
Weekly chart performance for "Your Time Has Come"
Chart (2005)	Peak position
Canada Rock Top 30 (Radio & Records)	19
US Bubbling Under Hot 100 (Billboard)	13
US Alternative Airplay (Billboard)	12
US Mainstream Rock (Billboard)	12

=== Year-end charts ===
Year-end chart performance for "Your Time Has Come"
Chart (2005)	Position
US Modern Rock Tracks (Billboard)	79
