= Cochise (song) =

Single by Audioslave

from the album Audioslave
- B-side: "We Got the Whip"; "Gasoline" (live)
- Released: September 25, 2002
- Recorded: 2002
- Genre: Hard rock; alternative metal; alternative rock; post-grunge
- Length: 3:42
- Label: Epic
- Songwriters: Chris Cornell; Tom Morello; Tim Commerford; Brad Wilk
- Producers: Rick Rubin; Audioslave

Audioslave singles chronology
"Cochise" (2002)	"Like a Stone" (2002)

Alternative cover

Music video
- "Cochise" on YouTube

Audio sample
- helicopter sounding guitar riff: file; help

"Cochise" is a song by American rock supergroup Audioslave. It was released as the lead single from their self-titled debut studio album on September 25, 2002, through Epic Records. The band produced the song alongside Rick Rubin. The song reached number 69 on the Billboard Hot 100 as well as the top ten of both the Mainstream Rock Tracks and Modern Rock Tracks charts.

== Composition and lyrics ==
Musically, "Cochise" has been described as hard rock, alternative metal and alternative rock. Originally titled "Save Yourself" after a line in the song's chorus, the song is named after Cochise, an Apache Indian chief "who declared war on the Southeast and drove out thousands of settlers". Speaking about the eponymous subject, guitarist Tom Morello remarked that "Cochise the Avenger, fearless and resolute, attacked everything in his path with an unbridled fury", adding that the song "kinda sounds like that". Despite this, the song's lyrics are generally unrelated to Cochise, and instead feature a number of religious references.

== Promotion and release ==
"Cochise" was originally made available for online streaming on LAUNCHcast from September 25, 2002. It was sent to radio stations on October 1, 2002. The track made its live debut as the opening song of the band's debut performance, in New York City for the Late Show with David Letterman on November 25, 2002, and was subsequently performed as the closing song at the majority of shows on the album's promotional concert tour.

The song was later featured on a number of external media releases, including as a playable track on the 2005 music video game Guitar Hero, on the 2006 comedy film Talladega Nights: The Ballad of Ricky Bobby, as a playable track on the Guitar Hero TV mode of 2015 music video game Guitar Hero Live, and in the trailer for 2015 wrestling video game WWE 2K16. In addition, "Cochise" also appeared in the New England Patriots' introduction video package at Super Bowl 51.

== Music video ==
The music video for "Cochise" was directed by Mark Romanek and features an elaborate fireworks-based light show by special effects and lighting designer Andrew Elias. "Cochise" was filmed near the Sepulveda Dam in Los Angeles, California on September 25 and 26, 2002. The video begins with the band members arriving at a construction rig in a Chevrolet C/K pickup truck, symbolizing a band without a singer, while Chris Cornell waits alone atop the rig, symbolizing a singer without a band. The band members take the elevator to the top of the rig, where they join Cornell and play the song as a barrage of fireworks go off behind them. After the song, the fireworks cease and the band members hug, signifying that a new band had been formed. Cornell left rehab in a car which drove him to the set of the video. Due to the large number of pyrotechnics used in the video, local residents believed that the explosions were caused by terrorists; speaking about the filming process, Morello revealed that "The local police and news station literally received thousands of calls from people who thought the city was under siege ... All the freeways were blocked because they thought there was an attack occurring". The amount of pyrotechnics and fireworks in the shooting also marked "Cochise" as a very expensive music video.

A teaser trailer was released for the video in mid-October, before the full video was made available for digital download later in the month. It was later included on the band's first video album, Audioslave, released in July 2003. The video was nominated for Best Video at the 2003 Kerrang! Awards, and was included in the MTV2 Headbangers Ball "Best Metal Videos of the New Millennium" list in 2004.

== Reception ==
=== Commercial ===
"Cochise" reached number 69 on the Billboard Hot 100 in the United States, as well as number 2 on the Mainstream Rock Tracks chart, number 9 on the Modern Rock Tracks chart, and number 68 on the Radio Songs chart. The single entered the UK Singles Chart at its peak position of number 24 on February 1, 2003, before dropping down to 41 and then 56. The song debuted at number 2 on the UK Rock & Metal Singles Chart, remaining on the chart until mid-June. It also reached number 33 on the Italian Singles Chart.

=== Critical ===
Media response to "Cochise" was generally positive. BBC Music's Amy McAuliffe noted that the song "sets the tone for the rest of the album [with] heavy, powerful riffage over rumbling bass lines and thumping colossal drums", comparing its style to that of Led Zeppelin and Black Sabbath. Blabbermouth.net's Don Kaye compared the style to Cornell's former band Soundgarden, highlighting the frontman's vocal performance and Morello's "meaty, straightforward" guitar riffs. Chris Heath of Dotmusic also praised the song's vocal and guitar performances, while Paul McNamee of the NME claimed that while the album was "overblown, overlong, piss-poor", lead single "Cochise" is "fierce and furious".

Chris Nettleton of Drowned in Sound praised many elements of the song, including Cornell's vocal performance and Morello's main guitar riff, but added that he wished the band "had chosen to break some new boundaries, instead of retreading an old town with new shoes". He also proposed that the song would have been better with political lyrics in the style of Rage Against the Machine, suggesting that "With those morons in the White House seeming out of control, politically incisive lyrics would have been just what the doctor ordered". Entertainment Weekly's David Browne, on the other hand, proposed that the "elliptical lyrics" to "Cochise" feature a "hint of social consciousness".

"Cochise" was nominated for the award for Best Single at the first annual Metal Hammer Golden God Awards in 2003.

== Track listing ==
All tracks are written by Chris Cornell, Tom Morello, Tim Commerford and Brad Wilk.

CD single
No.	Title	Length
1.	"Cochise"	3:42
2.	"We Got the Whip"	4:05
Total length:		7:47

Maxi single
No.	Title	Length
1.	"Cochise"	3:42
2.	"We Got the Whip"	4:05
3.	"Gasoline" (live from Letterman)	4:43
Total length:		12:30

Enhanced CD single
No.	Title	Length
1.	"Cochise"	3:42
2.	"We Got the Whip"	4:05
3.	"Gasoline" (live from Letterman)	4:43
4.	"Cochise" (music video)	3:42
Total length:		16:12

== Charts ==
Chart (2002–2003)	Peak position
Italy (FIMI)	33
Scottish Singles Sales (Official Charts)	22
UK Singles (Official Charts)	24
UK Rock & Metal (Official Charts)	2
US Billboard Hot 100	69
US Alternative Airplay (Billboard)	9
US Mainstream Rock (Billboard)	2

== Certifications ==
Region	Certification	Certified units/sales
New Zealand (RMNZ)	Gold	15,000^{‡}
United Kingdom (BPI)	Silver	200,000^{‡}
^{‡} Sales+streaming figures based on certification alone.
