= Out of Exile =

Studio album by Audioslave
- Released: May 23, 2005
- Recorded: July 2004 – January 2005
- Studio: Cello Studios (Hollywood, California); Akadamie Mathematique of Philosophical Sound Research (Los Angeles, California); Sunset Sound (Los Angeles, California); pre-production: Swinghouse (West Hollywood, California)
- Genre: Hard rock; alternative metal; alternative rock
- Length: 53:38
- Label: Epic; Interscope
- Producer: Rick Rubin; Audioslave

Audioslave chronology
Audioslave (2002)	Out of Exile (2005)	Revelations (2006)

Singles from Out of Exile
- 1. "Be Yourself" Released: February 2, 2005; 2. "Your Time Has Come" Released: May 3, 2005; 3. "Doesn't Remind Me" Released: July 5, 2005

Out of Exile is the second studio album by American rock supergroup Audioslave, released on May 23, 2005, internationally, and a day later in the United States, through Epic Records and Interscope Records. It is the band's only album to chart at number one on the Billboard 200 chart. The album spawned the singles "Be Yourself", "Your Time Has Come" and "Doesn't Remind Me" which was nominated for Best Hard Rock Performance at the 48th Grammy Awards.

== Background ==
In an interview shortly before the release of the album, drummer Brad Wilk said: "Audioslave the band has arrived. The first record was people from two other bands with history attached. I don't feel that with this record." For his part, Chris Cornell said he wrote his most personal songs ever for the album, influenced by positive changes in his life since 2002. He also described the album as more varied than the debut and relying less on heavy guitar riffs.

On May 4, 2005, the band traveled to Havana, to spend some time interacting with Cuban musicians before playing a concert in the city on May 6. An audience of 70,000 attended the free show, and Audioslave became the first American rock group to perform in Cuba. At the time, Cornell said he hoped the concert would "help to open the musical borders between our two countries." The 26-song set made the concert the longest the band had ever played. Many songs from Out of Exile were performed live for the first time at the concert, which was held three weeks prior to the release of the album. Live in Cuba, a concert documentary covering the band's time in Cuba, was released on DVD in October 2005.

The songs "Your Time Has Come" and "Man or Animal" were featured in the 2006 racing video game FlatOut 2.

== Reception ==
=== Critical ===
Professional ratings
Aggregate scores
Source	Rating
Metacritic	67/100
Review scores
Source	Rating
AllMusic	4/5 stars
The Austin Chronicle	4/5 stars
Blabbermouth	6.5/10
Entertainment Weekly	C+
Los Angeles Times	3/4 stars
Pitchfork	6.8/10
PopMatters	5/10
Rolling Stone	3/5 stars
Slant Magazine	3.5/5 stars
Spin	A−

Critical response to the album was mostly warm, with many reviews highlighting the fact that the band was beginning to establish its own identity, as opposed to just being Rage Against the Machine fronted by Cornell, which is how some critics described the sound of their first album. Improvement was noted in the quality of Cornell's vocals, likely the result of him quitting smoking and drinking. Slant Magazine said Out of Exile had "the sound of a band coming into its own", and Allmusic praised the album as "lean, hard, strong, and memorable."

The lyrics, however, were still a common complaint, with musicOMH.com writing that Cornell's lyrics "continue to border on the ridiculous."

The album was chosen as one of Amazon.com's Top 100 Editor's Picks of 2005.

=== Commercial ===
Out of Exile was released in the USA on May 24, 2005. It sold 263,000 copies in its first week of release, debuting at #1 on the Billboard 200 chart. The album has been certified platinum by the RIAA, indicating sales of 1 million units.

== Track listing ==
All lyrics written by Chris Cornell; all music composed by Audioslave.

Out of Exile track listing
No.	Title	Length
1.	"Your Time Has Come"	4:15
2.	"Out of Exile"	4:51
3.	"Be Yourself"	4:39
4.	"Doesn't Remind Me"	4:15
5.	"Drown Me Slowly"	3:53
6.	"Heaven's Dead"	4:36
7.	"The Worm"	3:57
8.	"Man or Animal"	3:53
9.	"Yesterday to Tomorrow"	4:33
10.	"Dandelion"	4:38
11.	"#1 Zero"	4:59
12.	"The Curse"	5:09
Total length:		53:38

UK bonus track
No.	Title	Length
13.	"Like a Stone" (live)	4:24

Japanese bonus tracks
No.	Title	Writer(s)	Length
13.	"Super Stupid" (Funkadelic cover) (live)	Edward Hazel, Lucious Ross, William Nelson, George Clinton	3:26
14.	"Like a Stone" (live)		4:24

== Personnel ==
Audioslave

- Chris Cornell – lead vocals; backing vocals on "Out of Exile"
- Tom Morello – guitars
- Tim Commerford – bass guitar
- Brad Wilk – drums

Production and design

- Produced by Rick Rubin and Audioslave
- Recorded by Brian Virtue, Thom Russo, and Jim Scott; Assisted by Jonny Polonsky, Jason Gossman, Dan Leffler, and Billy Mimes
- Album production coordinator/wrangler: Lindsay Chase
- Mixed by Brendan O'Brien
- Additional engineering by Billy Bowers
- Mastered by Stephen Marcussen
- Album cover by Antony Nagelmann
- Art direction by Robert Fisher
- Photography by Ethan Russell
- Pre-production engineering by Keith Simon

== Chart positions ==
=== Weekly charts ===
Weekly chart performance for Out of Exile
Chart (2005)	Peak position
Australian Albums (ARIA)	3
Austrian Albums (Ö3 Austria)	8
Belgian Albums (Ultratop Flanders)	35
Belgian Albums (Ultratop Wallonia)	44
Canadian Albums (Billboard)	1
Danish Albums (Hitlisten)	5
Dutch Albums (Album Top 100)	10
Finnish Albums (Suomen virallinen lista)	5
French Albums (SNEP)	31
German Albums (Offizielle Top 100)	6
Irish Albums (IRMA)	3
Italian Albums (FIMI)	8
New Zealand Albums (RMNZ)	1
Norwegian Albums (VG-lista)	1
Polish Albums (ZPAV)	10
Portuguese Albums (AFP)	7
Spanish Albums (Promusicae)	17
Swedish Albums (Sverigetopplistan)	2
Swiss Albums (Schweizer Hitparade)	7
UK Albums (Official Charts)	5
UK Rock & Metal Albums (Official Charts)	10
US Billboard 200	1

=== Year-end charts ===
Year-end chart performance for Out of Exile
Chart (2005)	Position
Australian Albums (ARIA)	67
New Zealand Albums (RMNZ)	39
Swedish Albums (Sverigetopplistan)	77
US Billboard 200	69

== Certifications ==
Certifications for Out of Exile
Region	Certification	Certified units/sales
Australia (ARIA)	Platinum	70,000^{^}
Canada (Music Canada)	Platinum	100,000^{^}
New Zealand (RMNZ)	Platinum	15,000^{^}
United Kingdom (BPI)	Gold	100,000^{^}
United States (RIAA)	Platinum	1,000,000^{^}
^{^} Shipments figures based on certification alone.

== See also ==
- List of number-one albums of 2005 (Canada)
- List of number-one albums in 2005 (New Zealand)
- List of number-one albums of 2005 (U.S.)
