= Doesn't Remind Me =

Single by Audioslave

from the album Out of Exile
- Released: July 5, 2005
- Genre: Hard rock
- Length: 4:15
- Label: Epic; Interscope
- Songwriters: Brad Wilk; Chris Cornell; Tim Commerford; Tom Morello
- Producer: Rick Rubin

Audioslave singles chronology
"Your Time Has Come" (2005)	"Doesn't Remind Me" (2005)	"Original Fire" (2006)

Music video
- "Doesn't Remind Me" on YouTube

"Doesn't Remind Me" is a song by the American rock supergroup Audioslave, released in July 2005 as the third single from their second studio album Out of Exile. The song was nominated for a Grammy Award for Best Hard Rock Performance at the 48th Grammy Awards.

== Music video ==
Directed by Chris Milk, the award-winning music video for "Doesn't Remind Me" starts off with a blurred image of an Uncle Sam poster tacked to a wall of a young boy's bedroom as he plays with a toy fighter plane. This boy is played by Vinny Intrieri, a six-year-old boxer from Philadelphia, who lives with his mother and sister, known better by his fight name, "Kid Vicious". Shot in a documentary-like style, this fictional story explores the world of Vinny's character. Throughout the video, Vinny enjoys playing with military planes and dedicates most of his free time to his boxing training. His obsession with planes becomes clearer when the audience sees a portrait of his father, an Air Force pilot, who died fighting in the Iraqi war. As a result, his widowed mother has been forced to raise him and his little sister. Tom Morello said, "We were all against the war from the very beginning, but now, I think you're seeing more and more that Middle America is turning against the war for reasons that are described in this video. The real human cost, the human tally of this awful war is shown in a very subtle, very real and very humanistic way. That's why it has such a great weight to it, because it personalizes this tragedy that's happening halfway around the world."

All of Vinny's training has been for an upcoming fight. In one scene he runs up the steps of the Philadelphia Museum of Art, imitating Sylvester Stallone's famous climb in Rocky. The music video culminates with a fight between Vinny and another boy in front of a packed crowd. Some of the footage seen is of an actual fight that Vinny fought in at The Blue Horizon. When the "junior match" gets underway, Vinny comes out punching. Between each of the punches, the video flashes back to images from Vinny's father's death. These images include: his father's fighter plane getting shot down over Iraq, his mother picking up the heart-breaking phone call, and the military funeral ceremony. The entire segment ends with Vinny winning the fight and celebrating with the crowd. The video parallels the song by showing the ways in which people find ways to forget about and move on from bad things. In this case Vinny leaves behind his toy planes which remind him of his father and boxes to forget about the painful event of his death.

Tim Commerford's opinion about the video was, "I think a lot of other people will cry when they see it, there aren't many videos that can do that to you—and still have a blistering guitar solo and a killer, kick-ass beat...I didn't know Little League boxing existed, and it's real, little kids actually go box and people love it. It makes sense, but it's barbaric." This video is also the first Audioslave video which doesn't feature themselves performing the song. As Cornell explained, "It wouldn't [have been] a plus, it would [have been] a minus, that story is that story, and the members of Audioslave appearing in whatever form would only take away from how amazing the story is."

== Track listing ==
=== Two-track version ===
1. "Doesn't Remind Me" (album version)
2. "Doesn't Remind Me" (live acoustic version from Sessions@AOL)

=== Four-track version ===
1. "Doesn't Remind Me" (album version) – 4:18
2. "Out of Exile" (live version from Sessions@AOL) – 4:55
3. "Doesn't Remind Me" (radio mix) – 6:33
4. "Doesn't Remind Me" (video)

== Personnel ==
- Tim Commerford – bass
- Chris Cornell – vocals
- Tom Morello – guitar
- Brad Wilk – drums
- Lenny Castro - percussion
- Jason Gossman – assistant engineer
- Dan Leffler – assistant engineer
- Brendan O'Brien – mixing
- Jonny Polonsky – assistant engineer
- Rick Rubin – producer
- Thom Russo – engineer
- Jim Scott – engineer
- Brian Virtue – engineer

== Charts ==
Chart (2005)	Peak position
Canada (Nielsen BDS)	31
Canada Rock Top 30 (Radio & Records)	1
Netherlands (Single Top 100)	92
Scottish Singles Sales (Official Charts)	71
UK Singles (Official Charts)	93
US Billboard Hot 100	68
US Alternative Airplay (Billboard)	3
US Mainstream Rock (Billboard)	2

== Certifications ==
Region	Certification	Certified units/sales
New Zealand (RMNZ)	Gold	15,000^{‡}
^{‡} Sales+streaming figures based on certification alone.

== Awards ==
- 15th Annual Music Video Production Association (MVPA) Awards – Winner "Video of the Year"
