= Audioslave (album) =

Studio album by Audioslave
- Released: November 18, 2002
- Recorded: May 2001 – June 2002
- Studio: Cello (Hollywood, California); Royaltone (Burbank, California); Litho (Seattle, Washington); Studio X (Seattle, Washington); Akademie Mathematique of Philosophical Sound Research (Los Angeles, California)
- Genre: Hard rock; alternative rock
- Length: 65:26
- Label: Epic; Interscope
- Producer: Rick Rubin; Audioslave

Audioslave chronology
Audioslave (2002)	Out of Exile (2005)

Singles from Audioslave
- 1. "Cochise" Released: September 25, 2002; 2. "Like a Stone" Released: January 20, 2003; 3. "Show Me How to Live" Released: June 2003; 4. "I Am the Highway" Released: September 16, 2003

Audioslave is the debut studio album by American rock supergroup Audioslave, released on November 18, 2002, through Epic Records and Interscope Records. In the United States, it has been certified triple platinum by the RIAA. The album spawned the singles "Cochise", "Like a Stone", "Show Me How to Live", "I Am the Highway", and "What You Are"; "Like a Stone" was nominated for Best Hard Rock Performance at the 46th Grammy Awards.

== Background and release ==
"Cochise" (2002)
For the introduction of "Cochise", Tom Morello created a helicopter-like sound with his guitar.

After Zack de la Rocha left Rage Against the Machine, the remaining members of the band began to look for a new vocalist. Producer and friend Rick Rubin suggested they contact Chris Cornell and played them the Soundgarden song "Slaves & Bulldozers" to showcase his ability. Cornell was in the process of writing material for a second solo album when Tom Morello, Tim Commerford, and Brad Wilk approached him, but he decided to shelve that and pursue the opportunity to work with them.

Speaking about the first time Cornell jammed with the band, Morello said: "He stepped to the microphone and sang the song and I couldn't believe it. It didn't just sound good. It didn't sound great. It sounded transcendent. And ... when there is an irreplaceable chemistry from the first moment, you can't deny it." The new quartet wrote 21 songs during 19 days of rehearsal and started recording their first album in late May 2001.

On March 19, 2002, the band announced they would be part of the 7th Ozzfest tour that summer, but three days later, Cornell quit the group, and the Ozzfest dates were canceled. He rejoined the band six weeks later, after some management issues were resolved.

Rough versions of 13 songs from the album were leaked onto various P2P file sharing networks on May 17, 2002, six months before the release of the album, under the name "Civilian" (or "The Civilian Project"). In an interview with Metal Sludge that July, Morello blamed "some jackass intern at Bad Animal Studios in Seattle" for stealing some demos and putting them on the internet without the band's permission. Later, he said that "It was very frustrating, especially with a band like this, there is a certain amount of expectation. For some people, the first time they heard it was not in the form you would have them hear it. In some cases, they weren't even the same lyrics, guitar solos, or performances of any kind."

Cornell was having problems with alcohol while making the album, and in late 2002, there was a rumor that he had checked into rehab—which was confirmed when he conducted an interview with Metal Hammer from a clinic payphone. He later said that he went through "a horrible personal crisis" during the making of the first Audioslave album, staying in rehab for two months and separating from his wife. He remained sober until shortly before his passing in 2017.

The album was released on November 18, 2002, in the UK and a day later in the USA. The band toured through 2003, before taking a break from the road in 2004 to record their second album.

== Artwork ==
The cover was designed by Storm Thorgerson (with Peter Curzon and Rupert Truman) – who, as leader of Hipgnosis, was best known for work for Pink Floyd.

"The music of Audioslave struck us as brooding and sultry, carrying a sense of threat as if about to burst asunder or erupt in fury, much like a volcano. We knew therefore the setting against which some thing or some act would either appear or take place… [The flame is] the eternal flame, or the flame of remembrance, embodying the memory of two previous incarnations: namely Soundgarden and Rage Against the Machine. [It is] a large sculpture of metal like a sounding brass, which pilgrims or slaves of sound (audioslave) were duty-bound to visit and pay homage with their beater. The location is the volcanic island of Lanzarote, a truly remarkable place." – Storm Thorgerson

An unreleased version of the cover, featuring a naked man looking at the flame, was shot elsewhere at the same location. "We so nearly used it," said Thorgerson, "but we were not entirely sure of the nude figure."

== Reception ==
=== Critical ===
Professional ratings
Aggregate scores
Source	Rating
Metacritic	62/100
Review scores
Source	Rating
AllMusic	3/5 stars
Entertainment Weekly	A−
Dotmusic	8/10
NME	4/10
Pitchfork	1.7/10
Playlouder	4.5/5 stars
Q	4.5/5 stars
Rolling Stone	3/5 stars
Spin	4/5 stars
Stylus	F

Audioslave received polarized reviews from critics. Some critics lambasted the group's efforts as uninspired and predictable.

Pitchfork's reviewers Chris Dahlen and Ryan Schreiber praised Cornell's voice, but criticized virtually every other aspect of the album, calling it "the worst kind of studio rock album, rigorously controlled -- even undercut -- by studio gimmickry". They described Cornell's lyrics as "complete gibberish" and called producer Rick Rubin's work "a synthesized rock-like product that emits no heat".

Jon Monks from Stylus Magazine also considered Rubin's production over-polished and wrote that, "lacking individuality, distinction and imagination this album is over-produced, overlong and over-indulgent". Stephen Thomas Erlewine of AllMusic gave the album a mixed three stars out of a possible five, writing: "Occasionally, the group winds up with songs that play to the strengths of both camps," but more often "many of the songs sound like they're just on the verge of achieving liftoff, never quite reaching their potential."

On the other hand, other critics praised the supergroup's style as reminiscent of 1970s heavy metal and compared it to Led Zeppelin and Black Sabbath, saying Audioslave add a much-needed sound and style to contemporary mainstream rock music and have the potential to become one of the best rock bands of the 21st century.

In 2005, Audioslave was ranked number 281 in Rock Hard magazine's book of The 500 Greatest Rock & Metal Albums of All Time.

=== Commercial ===
The album entered the Billboard 200 chart at position number seven, after selling 162,000 copies in its first week. It was certified gold by the RIAA less than a month after its release, and by 2006 had achieved triple-platinum status.

It is the most successful Audioslave album to date, having sold more than three million copies in the United States alone. The singles "Cochise", "Like a Stone", "Show Me How to Live", and "I Am the Highway" all reached the top ten of Billboard's Modern Rock Tracks chart, with "Like a Stone" reaching number one, and those four, plus "What You Are", reached the top ten of the Mainstream Rock chart, with "Like a Stone" again reaching the top spot.

== Track listing ==
All lyrics are written by Chris Cornell; all music is composed by Audioslave.

No.	Title	Length
1.	"Cochise"	3:42
2.	"Show Me How to Live"	4:38
3.	"Gasoline"	4:39
4.	"What You Are"	4:09
5.	"Like a Stone"	4:54
6.	"Set It Off"	4:23
7.	"Shadow on the Sun"	5:43
8.	"I Am the Highway"	5:35
9.	"Exploder"	3:26
10.	"Hypnotize"	3:27
11.	"Bring Em Back Alive"	5:29
12.	"Light My Way"	5:03
13.	"Getaway Car"	4:59
14.	"The Last Remaining Light"	5:17
Total length:		65:26

=== DualDisc version ===
The album was included among a group of 15 DualDisc releases that were test-marketed in two cities: Boston and Seattle. The DualDisc has the standard album on one side and bonus material on the other side. The DVD side of the Audioslave DualDisc featured the entire album in higher resolution 48 kHz sound, as well as some videos. The higher resolution DVD side of this disc has been called a demonstration-quality audiophile release.

=== ConnecteD bonus track ===
For a limited time, the CD could be inserted into a CD-ROM drive and used to access the ConnecteD website. Here, the user was able to download bonus videos, interviews, photos, and a bonus track ("Give").

== Personnel ==
Audioslave

- Chris Cornell – vocals
- Tim Commerford – bass, backing vocals
- Brad Wilk – drums
- Tom Morello – guitars

Production and design

- Produced by Rick Rubin; Co-Produced by Audioslave
- Mixed by Rich Costey
- Recorded by David Schiffman and Andrew Scheps
- Additional Engineering by John Burton, Floyd Reitsma, Thom Russo, and Andrew Scheps; Assisted by Chris Holmes and Darron Mora
- Digital Editing by Greg Fidelman, Thom Russo, and Andrew Scheps
- Album Production Coordinator/Wrangler: Lindsay Chase
- Mastered by Vlado Meller, Assisted by Steve Kadison
- Album Cover by Storm Thorgerson and Peter Curzon
- Art Direction by Storm Thorgerson; Assisted by Dan Abbott and Finlay Cowan
- "Flame" Logo by Peter Curzon
- Photography by Rupert Truman
- Band Photos by Danny Clinch
- Sculpture Made by Hothouse

== Charts ==
=== Weekly charts ===
Weekly chart performance for Audioslave
Chart (2002–2003)	Peak position
Australian Albums (ARIA)	8
Austrian Albums (Ö3 Austria)	53
Canadian Albums (Billboard)	6
Danish Albums (Hitlisten)	37
Dutch Albums (Album Top 100)	30
Europe (European Top 100 Albums)	33
Finnish Albums (Suomen virallinen lista)	28
French Albums (SNEP)	51
German Albums (Offizielle Top 100)	39
Irish Albums (IRMA)	21
New Zealand Albums (RMNZ)	4
Norwegian Albums (VG-lista)	5
Polish Albums (ZPAV)	30
Scottish Albums (Official Charts)	39
Swedish Albums (Sverigetopplistan)	14
Swiss Albums (Schweizer Hitparade)	34
UK Albums (Official Charts)	19
UK Rock & Metal Albums (Official Charts)	2
US Billboard 200	7
US Top Alternative Albums (Billboard)	6
US Top Hard Rock Albums (Billboard)	4
US Top Rock Albums (Billboard)	9

=== Year-end charts ===
2002 year-end chart performance for Audioslave
Chart (2002)	Position
Canadian Albums (Nielsen SoundScan)	133
Canadian Alternative Albums (Nielsen SoundScan)	41
Canadian Metal Albums (Nielsen SoundScan)	20

2003 year-end chart performance for Audioslave
Chart (2003)	Position
Australian Albums (ARIA)	34
New Zealand Albums (RMNZ)	5
UK Albums (OCC)	133
US Billboard 200	23

2004 year-end chart performance for Audioslave
Chart (2004)	Position
US Billboard 200	100

=== Decade-end charts ===
Decade-end chart performance for Audioslave
Chart (2000–2009)	Position
US Billboard 200	171

== Certifications ==
Certifications of Audioslave
Region	Certification	Certified units/sales
Australia (ARIA)	3× Platinum	210,000^{^}
Brazil (Pro-Música Brasil)	Gold	50,000^{*}
Canada (Music Canada)	2× Platinum	200,000^{^}
Finland (Musiikkituottajat)	Gold	15,850
Germany (BVMI)	Gold	100,000^{‡}
Italy (FIMI) sales since 2009	Gold	25,000^{‡}
New Zealand (RMNZ)	3× Platinum	45,000^{^}
Norway (IFPI Norway)	Gold	20,000^{*}
United Kingdom (BPI)	Platinum	300,000^{^}
United States (RIAA)	3× Platinum	3,000,000^{^}
^{*} Sales figures based on certification alone.^{^} Shipments figures based on certification alone.^{‡} Sales+streaming figures based on certification alone.
