= Like a Stone =

2003 single by Audioslave

Single by Audioslave

from the album Audioslave
- Released: January 20, 2003
- Genre: Alternative rock; hard rock; post-grunge
- Length: 4:54
- Label: Epic; Interscope
- Songwriters: Brad Wilk; Chris Cornell; Tim Commerford; Tom Morello
- Producers: Rick Rubin; Audioslave

Audioslave singles chronology
"Cochise" (2002)	"Like a Stone" (2003)	"Show Me How to Live" (2003)

Music video
- "Like a Stone" on YouTube

Audio sample
- file; help

"Like a Stone" is a song by the American rock supergroup Audioslave, released as the second single from their debut studio album, Audioslave, in January 2003. The song topped both the US Billboard Mainstream Rock Tracks and Modern Rock Tracks charts and reached number 31 on the Billboard Hot 100 chart, making it their biggest US hit.

== Background and composition ==
Bassist Tim Commerford claimed that the song is about an old man waiting for death, who sits in a house alone after all his friends and family have passed on, waiting to be reunited with them. However, while Commerford originally thought it was a song about love and romance, the band's singer and songwriter Chris Cornell explained that "It's a song about concentrating on the afterlife you would hope for, rather than the normal monotheistic approach: You work really hard all your life to be a good person and a moral persona and fair and generous, and then you go to hell anyway."

The melancholy tone and certain parts of the lyrics of "Like a Stone" have prompted some to wonder if Cornell wrote the song about the late Alice in Chains singer Layne Staley, who died in April 2002. Cornell denied this, saying "No. I'm not one of those guys where, like, something happens and then I go run around, 'Ooh, 9/11, and now it's 9/12, let me write about that. I wrote the lyrics before he died. [...] You can misinterpret that stuff pretty easy, but I don't tend to sit down and plan on writing about a specific issue. They come up or they don't."

== Music video ==
The music video for "Like a Stone" was filmed in January 2003 and released on February 22, 2003. It was conceived and directed by Meiert Avis, a Grammy-winner who also directed videos for State Radio, U2, Bruce Springsteen, Bob Dylan, J-Lo and many others. The video was produced by Oualid Mouaness, edited by Jim Rhoads and set in an old Spanish mansion in Silver Lake, Los Angeles where Jimi Hendrix once lived and wrote music in. Commerford's then 1-year-old son, Xavier was featured in the video. It shows the band performing inside the mansion where they also set up a recording booth. According to Avis, the strange green/blue color palette of the video was to suggest bruising and abuse.

The music video reached over 1 billion views on YouTube in October 2022.

== Track listing ==
A CD single of "Like a Stone" released in the United Kingdom in 2003 contains the following tracks. All lyrics were written by Chris Cornell, and all music was composed by Audioslave except "Super Stupid", written by George Clinton, Eddie Hazel, Billy Bass Nelson, and Tawl Ross.

1. "Like a Stone" – 4:54
2. "Like a Stone" (live on BBC Radio 1) – 4:58
3. "Gasoline" (live on BBC Radio 1) – 4:45
4. "Set It Off" (live on Late Show with David Letterman) – 4:01
5. "Super Stupid" (live on BBC Radio 1)
6. "Like a Stone" (music video)

== Charts ==
=== Weekly charts ===
2003 weekly chart performance for "Like a Stone"
Chart (2003)	Peak position
Australia (ARIA)	35
Italy (FIMI)	40
New Zealand (Recorded Music NZ)	14
UK Rock & Metal (Official Charts)	30
US Billboard Hot 100	31
US Adult Pop Airplay (Billboard)	23
US Alternative Airplay (Billboard)	1
US Mainstream Rock (Billboard)	1
US Pop Airplay (Billboard)	27

2017 weekly chart performance for "Like a Stone"
Chart (2017)	Peak position
Canada Digital Song Sales (Billboard)	43
UK Rock & Metal (Official Charts)	14
US Hot Rock & Alternative Songs (Billboard)	7

=== Year-end charts ===
2003 year-end chart performance for "Like a Stone"
Chart (2003)	Position
Brazil (Crowley)	56
Colombia (B & V Marketing)	2
US Billboard Hot 100	96
US Adult Top 40 (Billboard)	65
US Mainstream Rock Tracks (Billboard)	2
US Modern Rock Tracks (Billboard)	3

2017 year-end chart performance for "Like a Stone"
Chart (2017)	Position
US Hot Rock Songs (Billboard)	91

=== Decade-end charts ===
Decade-end chart performance for "Like a Stone"
Chart (2000–2009)	Position
US Hot Alternative Songs (Billboard)	5
US Hot Rock Songs (Billboard)	8

== Certifications ==
Certifications for "Like a Stone"
Region	Certification	Certified units/sales
Australia (ARIA)	Gold	35,000^{‡}
New Zealand (RMNZ)	4× Platinum	120,000^{‡}
Portugal (AFP)	Gold	20,000^{‡}
Spain (Promusicae)	Gold	30,000^{‡}
United Kingdom (BPI)	Silver	200,000^{‡}
United States (RIAA)	Gold	500,000^{*}
^{*} Sales figures based on certification alone.^{‡} Sales+streaming figures based on certification alone.

== Release history ==
Release dates and formats for "Like a Stone"
Region	Date	Format(s)	Label(s)	Ref.
United States	January 20–21, 2003	Mainstream rock; active rock; alternative radio	Epic; Interscope	
Australia	April 7, 2003	CD	Epic; Interscope	
United Kingdom	April 21, 2003	7-inch vinyl; CD	Epic; Interscope	
