= Audioslave =

American rock supergroup

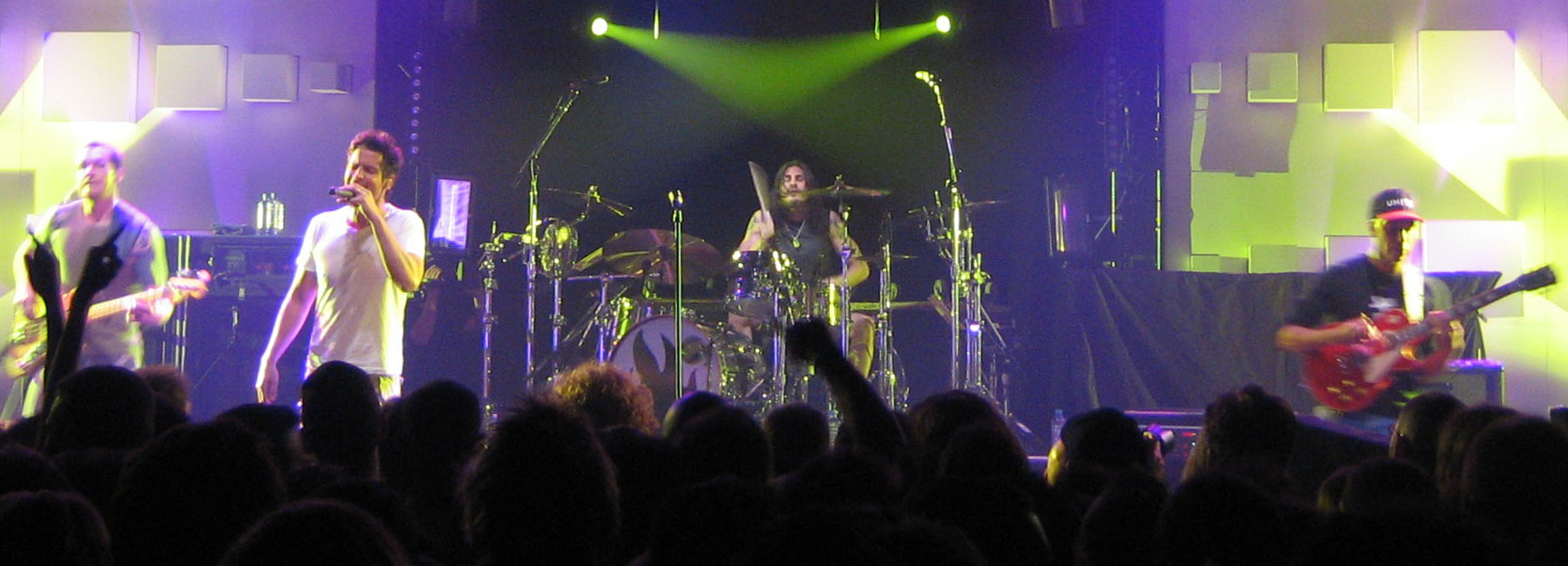
- Audioslave performing at Montreux Jazz Festival in 2005. From left to right: Tim Commerford, Chris Cornell, Brad Wilk and Tom Morello

Background information
- Origin: Glendale, California, U.S.
- Genres: Hard rock; alternative metal; post-grunge; alternative rock
- Works: Discography; songs
- Years active: 2001–2007; 2017
- Labels: Epic; Interscope
- Spinoffs: Prophets of Rage
- Spinoff of: Rage Against the Machine; Soundgarden
- Past members: Chris Cornell; Tim Commerford; Tom Morello; Brad Wilk

Audioslave was an American rock supergroup formed in Glendale, California, in 2001. The four-piece band consisted of Soundgarden's singer and guitarist Chris Cornell with Rage Against the Machine members Tom Morello (lead guitar), Tim Commerford (bass/backing vocals), and Brad Wilk (drums). Critics first described Audioslave as a combination of Soundgarden and Rage Against the Machine, but by the band's second album, Out of Exile, it was noted that they had established a separate identity. Their sound was created by blending 1970s hard rock and 1990s alternative rock, with musical influences that included 1960s funk, soul and R&B. As with Rage Against the Machine, the band prided themselves on the fact that all sounds on their albums were produced using only guitars, bass, drums, and vocals, with emphasis on Cornell's wide vocal range and Morello's unconventional guitar solos.

In their six years together, Audioslave released three albums, received three Grammy nominations, sold more than eight million records worldwide and became the first American rock band to perform an open-air concert in Cuba. They disbanded in February 2007 after Cornell issued a statement announcing that he was leaving the band.

Audioslave reunited to perform at Prophets of Rage's Anti-Inaugural Ball on January 20, 2017; Cornell's death later that year precluded any chance of further reunions.

== History ==
=== Formation (2000–2001) ===
On October 18, 2000, Rage Against the Machine broke up after the vocalist, Zack de la Rocha, announced he was leaving, citing a breakdown in the band's "decision-making process". The remaining members—Tim Commerford, Tom Morello and Brad Wilk— announced plans to search for a new vocalist.

Several vocalists jammed with them, including B-Real of Cypress Hill, but the band did not want another rapper or anybody who sounded like de la Rocha. Layne Staley of Alice in Chains was long rumored to have auditioned, but Morello denied this on Twitter in 2015. Music producer and friend Rick Rubin suggested that they play with Chris Cornell of Soundgarden, which had broken up in 1997. Rubin also persuaded Morello, Wilk and Commerford to go into group therapy with performance coach Phil Towle after the breakup. Rubin was confident that, with the right new voice, Rage Against the Machine had the potential to become a better band, as the Yardbirds had evolved into Led Zeppelin. Commerford later credited Rubin for being the catalyst that brought Audioslave together. He called him "the angel at the crossroads" because "if it wasn't for him, I wouldn't be here today".

The chemistry with Cornell was immediately apparent. Morello said: "He stepped to the microphone and sang the song and I couldn't believe it. It didn't just sound good. It didn't sound great. It sounded transcendent. And...when there is an irreplaceable chemistry from the first moment, you can't deny it." The group wrote 21 songs during 19 days of rehearsal, and began working in the studio in late May 2001 with Rubin as producer, while sorting out the label and management issues.

=== Audioslave (2002–2003) ===
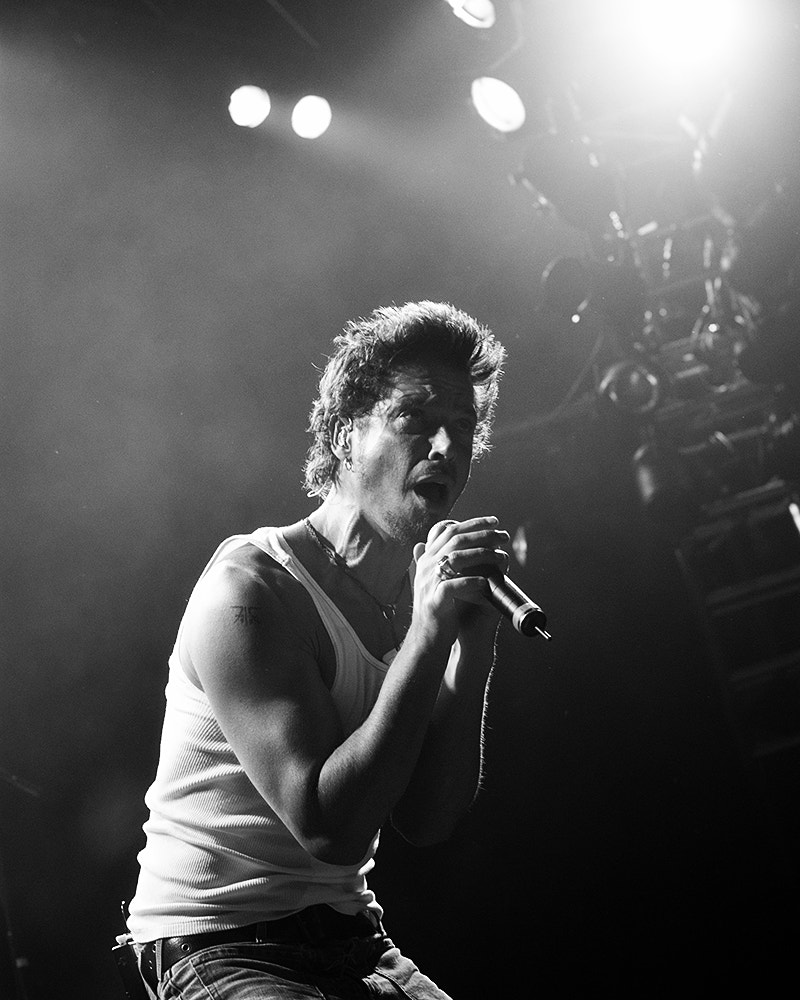
Chris Cornell performing with Audioslave at the 3Arena, Dublin in 2003

On March 19, 2002, the group, still unnamed, was confirmed for the seventh annual Ozzfest. A few days later, reports surfaced that the band had broken up before they had played for a public audience. Cornell's manager confirmed that he had left the band, with no explanation given.

Initial rumors suggested that Cornell took issue with having two managers actively involved in the project (Jim Guerinot of Rebel Waltz represented Cornell, and Peter Mensch of Q Prime handled Rage Against the Machine). According to the band, however, the split was not triggered by personal conflicts, but by their quarreling managers. After the mixing of the album was finished, roughly six weeks later, the group reformed and simultaneously fired their former management companies and hired another, the Firm. Their previous labels, Epic and Interscope, settled their differences by agreeing to alternate who released the band's albums.

Meanwhile, 13 rough mixes of songs the band had created months previously were leaked to peer-to-peer filesharing networks in May 2002, under the names Civilian or the Civilian Project. According to Morello, the songs were unfinished and, in some cases, "weren't even the same lyrics, guitar solos, performances of any kind". He described them as "inferior sketches of works-in-progress, sent to Seattle for Chris to work on. Someone at that studio helped themselves to a copy and, after eight months, it made its way to an Italian website. Then it went global and everyone thought they had the record, which was so frustrating."

"Cochise" (2002)
"Cochise", the band's first single features a unique intro, typical of Tom Morello, that was compared to the sound of a helicopter.

The band announced their name after coming to an agreement with a Liverpool based band with the same name and launched their website in early September. The first single, "Cochise", was posted online in late September, and was on the radio in early October. Critics praised Cornell's vocal style, a departure from the rapping of de la Rocha, and found that "the former members of RATM have gone and done a Paul Weller, retreating from the ground they broke back [to] the sounds that inspired them". Director Mark Romanek shot a music video for "Cochise", which shows the band playing atop a tower under construction in the midst of a giant fireworks display providing all the lighting. The firework explosions during filming prompted fears of a terrorist attack among residents living near Los Angeles' Sepulveda Dam, the shooting location.

The band's debut album, Audioslave, was released on November 19, 2002, and entered the Billboard 200 chart at No. 7 after selling 162,000 copies in its first week. It was certified gold within a month of release, and by 2006 achieved triple platinum status. It remains the most successful Audioslave album, having sold more than three million copies in the United States alone. It received mixed reviews; some critics felt it was uninspired, and predictable. Pitchfork praised Cornell's voice, but criticized virtually every other aspect, deeming the lyrics "complete gibberish" and Rubin's production "a synthesized rock-like product that emits no heat". Other critics praised the style as reminiscent of 1970s rock, and compared it to Led Zeppelin and Black Sabbath, saying they added much-needed sound and style to contemporary mainstream rock.

Audioslave made their live debut on November 25, 2002, performing a brief concert on the roof of the Ed Sullivan Theater on Broadway in New York City for the Late Show with David Letterman. It was the first time any band had appeared on Letterman's marquee. That year's KROQ Almost Acoustic Christmas was Audioslave's first paying concert, in which the band played on the first night, December 7, after giving a secret club show the night before. Toward the end of the band's six-song set, Cornell told the audience, "These guys saved my life this year," and the show ended with his bandmates hugging him. Afterwards, asked to expand on his comments, he would say only that he had dragged the trio "through a trail of shit" in the past months. Cornell later confirmed that he had checked into drug rehabilitation. In a San Diego CityBEAT article, Cornell explained that he went through "a horrible personal crisis" during the making of the first record, staying in rehab for two months and separating from his wife. He credited Morello, Commerford and Wilk with helping him rebound. He dismissed rumors about problems with OxyContin or heroin, but when asked, offered only, "Various things. I'm not picky. Mainly for drinking."

"Like a Stone" (2002)
"Like a Stone" was the band's most successful single, achieving gold status in the U.S.

"Like a Stone", the second single from Audioslave, was released in early 2003. It was the highest-charting single from the album, reaching number one on Billboard's Mainstream Rock Tracks and Modern Rock Tracks charts. It was certified gold, making it Audioslave's most successful single. The music video for "Like a Stone" was written and directed by Meiert Avis and uses negative space to invoke the memory of musicians past. The music video for the third single, "Show Me How to Live", was banned by MTV, reportedly because it shows the band in a high-speed car chase running police cars and motorcycles off the road. The band's first DVD, Audioslave, was released on July 29, 2003.

Audioslave toured extensively worldwide in 2003, gaining positive reviews for their performances, including at the revived Lollapalooza. Their performance on the Lollapalooza tour won the Metal Edge 2003 Readers' Choice Award for "Favorite Lollapalooza Band".

=== Out of Exile (2004–2005) ===
In 2004, at the 46th Grammy Awards, "Like a Stone" was nominated for "Best Hard Rock Performance" and Audioslave for "Best Rock Album". They spent the rest of 2004 on break from touring and working on the second album. This gave Morello time to concentrate on his solo project, the Nightwatchman, and also to take an active part in political activities. Cornell had time to focus on his personal life; after his divorce from his first wife was finalized, he married Vicky Karayiannis, a Paris-based publicist he met during Audioslave's first European tour.

Work on a new album had started in 2003 during the Lollapalooza tour, and continued at the end of the year when band members entered the studio. Aside from writing new material, the band also had some leftover songs from the Audioslave sessions; according to Morello, they had "almost another album's worth of stuff [already done]." "Be Yourself", the first single from the still-untitled album, was panned by some critics, who felt it was "limp, and the lyrics are bland and directionless". Nevertheless, it reached number one on the Mainstream and Modern Rock charts.

"Be Yourself" (2005)
"Be Yourself" was the first single from Out of Exile. It is one of the most radio-friendly songs the band had ever recorded.

In April 2005, the band launched a club tour, which lasted until late May. Although on previous tours Audioslave occasionally played cover songs, they deliberately avoided playing their former bands' songs to avoid using those songs as a "crutch" to "help sell and break Audioslave" as their aim was to establish the band as an "independent entity". After achieving that goal, they thought it was "time to own those histories," and began performing a selection of the two bands' most popular songs (such as "Black Hole Sun" and "Bulls on Parade") on the tour.

The second single, "Your Time Has Come" was released through a unique promotion, lasting one week, which involved radio listeners around the world. Radio stations were asked to post a link on their websites to a special timed-out download of the song. Once one million people clicked on the link, the song was unlocked and became downloadable by all one million.

On May 6, 2005, Audioslave played a free show in Havana, Cuba, in front of an estimated 50,000 people at the La Tribuna Antiimperialista José Martí (José Martí Anti-Imperialist Stand) venue, which was purpose-built in 2000 for mass protests against the U.S. government. Audioslave became the first American rock group to perform an open-air concert in the socialist republic of Cuba. The band traveled to Havana—bringing along their camera crew—on May 4 to spend two days visiting historic sites and interacting with Cuban musicians and youngsters. Morello and the rest of the band insisted that the trip was not to make a political statement, but to take part in a musical cultural exchange. Cornell commented: "Hopefully, this concert will help to open the musical borders between our two countries." The trip was organized with the joint authorization of the United States Department of the Treasury and the Instituto Cubano de la Musica (Cuban Institute of Music), as travel by U.S. citizens to Cuba is restricted, but the authorization arrived so late that the band had to cancel and postpone several confirmed dates of their U.S. tour. The 26-song-set concert—which included several Soundgarden and Rage Against the Machine songs—was the longest the band had ever played.

Out of Exile was released internationally on May 23, 2005, then a day later in the U.S. It debuted at the top of the Billboard 200 chart, the only Audioslave album to reach this position. The following week, however, it dropped to number three, with a 62-percent sales decrease—consequently reaching platinum. Cornell admitted to writing some of his most personal songs on the album, influenced by the positive changes in his life since 2002. He described the album as more varied than the debut and relying less on heavy guitar riffs.

The album was received more favorably than Audioslave's debut; critics noted Cornell's stronger vocals, likely the result of quitting smoking and drinking, and pointed out that Out of Exile is "the sound of a band coming into its own." AllMusic, which gave Audioslave a lukewarm review, praised the album as "lean, hard, strong, and memorable." The lyrics, however, were still a common complaint. MusicOMH.com wrote that Cornell's lyrics "continue to border on the ridiculous"; the album's softer, slower approach was frequently criticized as well.

Following the album's release, the band embarked on a European tour, performed at the Live 8 benefit concert in Berlin on July 2, 2005, and played their first North American headlining arena tour from late September to November 2005. The music video for "Doesn't Remind Me", the third single from Out of Exile, was posted online in September 2005. Audioslave's second DVD, Live in Cuba, featuring the concert in Havana, was released on October 11, 2005. It was certified platinum in less than two months.

=== Revelations and breakup (2006–2007) ===
In December 2005, Audioslave received its third Grammy nomination at the 48th Grammy Awards in the Best Hard Rock Performance category for "Doesn't Remind Me". Audioslave began recording their next album; Cornell had already expressed his desire to make "an album every year or year-and-a-half" even before Out of Exile was released. In early July 2005, after the conclusion of the European tour, the band returned to the studio to write new songs; Morello said their aim was to "blur the lines between rehearsing, recording and touring." The actual recording began in January 2006, with plans to release the album, Revelations, in June. This time, the band chose Out of Exile's mixer, Brendan O'Brien, as producer.

"Original Fire" (2006)
"Original Fire", the first single from Revelations, was inspired by the Seattle music scene Cornell was part of in the late 1980s.

Audioslave had 20 songs written and recorded, 16 of those in only three weeks. The album's release date, however, was postponed to early September, and the band cancelled their previously announced European tour, to have a new album to support, when they embarked on touring. The first single off the album, "Original Fire", was made available online on Audioslave's official website for free streaming in early July.

News about Cornell's departure emerged in July 2006, when insiders stated that after the third album was released, he would depart the band and restart his solo career. Cornell immediately denied the rumors, stating "We hear rumors that Audioslave is breaking up all the time. ... I always just ignore [them]." In the same interview, he also discussed his intentions to record a new solo album, the second in seven years, before the end of August.

Audioslave Nation was created on Google Earth as a special marketing campaign for Revelations.

A special marketing campaign preceded the new album's release in August, when the art concept was featured on Google Earth as a fictional utopian island, Audioslave Nation, created in the South Pacific. Several songs from the upcoming album appeared on movie and video game soundtracks; "Wide Awake" and "Shape of Things to Come" were featured in Miami Vice, while "Revelations" was on the soundtrack of Madden NFL 07. Revelations was released on September 5, 2006. The album entered the Billboard 200 at No. 2 and sold 142,000 copies during its first week of release. It became the band's least commercially successful album; dropping even faster than Out of Exile, its sales were down 65 percent the following week, achieving gold certification a month later. The album showed funk, soul and R&B influences that were non-existent for the band before; Morello referred to the new sound as "Led Zeppelin meets Earth, Wind & Fire". Additionally, several songs took a more overtly political stance than previous Audioslave releases.

The album received a similar critical response to Out of Exile with the majority of reviewers praising the band's integrity on the record. The new funk and soul influences were also welcomed favorably; Allmusic called the album Audioslave's "most colorful, diverse, and consistent record yet." Many others, however, saw it as "just another rock record", and musically not much different from the previous album.

Cornell decided to delay the Revelations tour until 2007, because he wanted to "let the album come out for awhile [sic]" and also concentrate on his second solo album. The rest of the band went along; Morello also revealed his plans to release his debut solo album in early 2007. The second, and final single from the album, "Revelations" was released in October 2006 with an accompanying music video a month later.

On January 22, 2007, Rage Against the Machine was announced to reunite for one show only, at the Coachella Valley Music and Arts Festival, on April 29. Less than a month later, on February 15, Cornell officially announced his departure from Audioslave, issuing this statement:

Due to irresolvable personality conflicts as well as musical differences, I am permanently leaving the band Audioslave. I wish the other three members nothing but the best in all of their future endeavors.

He stated that, as far as he was concerned, Audioslave had disbanded, and that a greatest hits collection would be issued in the future, because of label commitments.

=== Post-breakup (2008–2016) ===
Morello and Cornell initially disagreed over the particulars of Cornell quitting the group, with Morello claiming that Cornell did not communicate directly with him about leaving, while Cornell countered: "Tom and I did have communications about the fact that I was gonna go make a record, and that I was tired of what ended up seeming like political negotiations toward how we were gonna do Audioslave business and getting nowhere with it." He also added that this process of "doing Audioslave business" led him to go solo. Contrary to some reports, Cornell has stated that the breakup was not about money, but that he was just not getting along with the other members during their later years. Said Cornell, "Getting along as people is one thing. Getting along as a group of people that can work together in a band situation...We weren't particularly getting along well, no. Bands work in a way where everyone at some point has to have a similar idea of how you do things...Three albums into it, it started to seem like our interests weren't as conjoined anymore."

In 2011, Cornell revealed further information about the band's breakup; "Personally a lot of it was me trying to land on my feet again. I went through a lot of personal turmoil right around the time Audioslave formed and unfortunately I think that affected the band a little bit in terms of me not really being grounded...I think there was stuff that could have been resolved, and there was drama that was probably unnecessary, typical rock band stuff. I certainly played a role in it. I definitely feel like I was part of a lot of unnecessary stuff. It didn't need to become what it became. You learn with experience."

In 2012, Morello said that unreleased material that was not on the three albums could be released in the future at an unspecified point. Cornell and Morello shared the stage together for the first time in seven years, among many musicians, at the 2013 Rock and Roll Hall of Fame concert. Cornell also joined Morello on stage on September 26, 2014, guesting on his solo Seattle show. They played together several Nightwatchman songs, Cornell's usual acoustic covers, and for the first time in eight years, some Audioslave songs.

In August 2015, Cornell openly said in interview with Total Guitar that he was quite eager to reunite with Audioslave: "I think it would be great. We did a lot of songs, and with the benefit of not having done anything with those guys for so long, I can't imagine what it would be. It would be a really amazing experience just to get back and work with the same guys again." Soon after, Morello said that he was interested in working with Cornell again, remembering their 2014 Seattle performance with great fondness: "I love Chris and consider him a great friend. The Hall of Fame jam was nice, but a little chaotic. Playing with him in Seattle, that was just fantastic. I love that guy. He's one of the most talented vocalists in the history of vocalists. And to be able to play the songs that we wrote together, it was awesome and so much fun. I hope we do something like that again."

=== Reunion and death of Chris Cornell (2017) ===
On January 17, 2017, it was announced that Audioslave would reunite for their first show in 12 years at Prophets of Rage's Anti-Inaugural Ball, protesting President Donald Trump's inauguration. The event took place on January 20, 2017, with the band performing a three song set.

Asked in February 2017 if there would be more Audioslave reunion shows in the future, Cornell replied, "It's always a possibility. I mean, we've been talking about it for at least three or four years now. We were talking about actually picking dates, and it just ended up not working out because everybody's so busy. They have another band again, they all have separate bands that they do themselves, I have Soundgarden and a solo career that's taking up a lot of time, and I just did Temple of the Dog. So, it's really honestly as simple as we end up having a window of time where it's comfortable for everybody and we want to do it, because I definitely feel like everybody's up for it."

However, on May 18, 2017, three months after making that statement, Cornell was found deceased in his Detroit hotel room, ending the possibility of any future Audioslave reunions with their original lead vocalist.

In 2019, Morello teased the existence of "a record’s worth" of unreleased Audioslave songs with Cornell's vocals, but none have so far seen release. During an interview with SNSMix in November 2025, Morello further stated that "There’s no plan to not put it out. I would love for it to get in the world and hopefully it will one day."

== Name ==
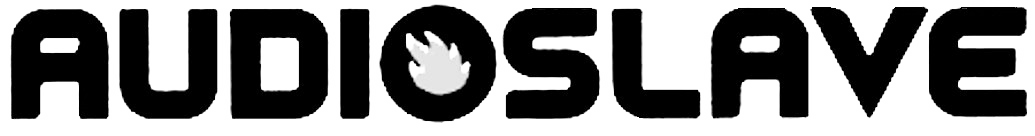
Audioslave logo

The original idea for the band's name was "Civilian", but it was dropped when members found out that it was already taken. Morello later discredited the story, contradicting Commerford and Cornell, and commented that "Civilian" was merely a rumor circulating at the time. He stated: "The band has only ever had one name, and that is Audioslave." Morello described the origin of the "Audioslave" name to LAUNCHcast as follows:

That was Chris' suggestion that sort of came to him in a vision. We're all on the two-way pagers, and Chris one night said, "I got it. It's Audioslave." We were all, like, "All right, fantastic." ... To paraphrase Elvis Costello, talking about band names is like dancing about architecture—there's just no point in it because the band name becomes the music and the people.

After the name was announced, it emerged that it was already being used by an unsigned band from Liverpool. The two bands worked out a settlement, with the American Audioslave paying $30,000 in a deal that allowed each band to use the name. To avoid confusion, the Liverpool band would rename themselves "The Most Terrifying Thing".

The name was mocked by critics due to its uninspired nature, and was regarded as one of the worst in contemporary rock music, or even of all time. Pitchfork called it the "most asinine bandname of the year," and Chuck Klosterman of Spin magazine chided it as "one of the dumbest band names in recent rock history."

== Musical style and influences ==
Audioslave's musical style has generally been regarded as hard rock, alternative metal, post-grunge, and alternative rock. Tom Morello noted that more varied influences the band shared compared to his and Chris Cornell's previous projects, stating, "There are some of the more predictable influences — Black Sabbath and Led Zeppelin — but we’ve been able to weave in some more esoteric influences like Chemical Brothers and Portishead, and even Woody Guthrie."

By combining 1970s style hard rock riffing with alternative rock, Audioslave created a distinctive sound. This mix was driven by Cornell's wide vocal range, Morello's innovative guitar solos and the robust rhythm section of Wilk and Commerford. Morello, although stating he "never felt musically limited" in Rage Against the Machine, did say that he had "a lot more scope to explore with Audioslave" and a "wider musical territory". This meant that the instrumentalists had the opportunity to write slow and melodic songs, something they had not done before.

As opposed to de la Rocha's lyrics, Cornell's were mostly apolitical; Morello referred to them as "haunted, existential poetry". They were characterised by his cryptic approach, often dealing with themes of existentialism, love, hedonism, spirituality and Christianity. For Revelations, which was influenced by 1960s and 1970s funk, soul and R&B music, Morello used vintage guitars and amplifiers and Cornell adopted his "seventies funk and R&B-flavor vocals". He also cited Sly & the Family Stone, James Brown and Funkadelic as influences on the funk overtones on the album.

Just as Rage Against the Machine did, Audioslave also included the statement "All sounds made by guitar, bass, drums and vocals" in their albums' booklets as Morello's guitar work often caused listeners to believe that the band used samples, synthesiser effects or different turntable techniques to produce certain sounds.

== Songwriting and recording process ==
All of Audioslave's lyrics were written by Cornell, while all four members—as a band—were credited with writing the music. Their songwriting process was described by Wilk as "more collaborative" and "satisfying" than Rage Against the Machine's, which was "a battle creatively". Cornell also felt the same way; he saw Soundgarden's songwriting method inferior to Audioslave's. Rick Rubin, producer of the band's first two albums, was also lauded as "a great collaborative partner" and was likened to "the fifth Beatle" by Tom Morello. The time spent on songwriting by the band was always short. They wrote 21 songs in 19 days for the first album and exceeded that rate for the second album by having a song or sometimes two written every day. This method was adopted for the third album as well.

Cornell's battle with drug addiction and alcoholism was a defining factor in the writing and recording process of the debut album. He said he was "never able to write effectively" while drinking, and attended rehab after recording Audioslave. Although Morello stated that Revelations was "the first record [Cornell] didn't smoke, drink or take drugs through the recording," he later clarified his statement by saying: "Chris was stone sober during the making of our Out of Exile album. Chris was also sober during the making of Revelations and prior to recording he gave up smoking as well."

== Politics ==
Guitarist Tom Morello (orange shirt) with Not in Our Name volunteers at an Axis of Justice tent at the July 13, 2003 Lollapalooza festival in Columbus, Ohio

In contrast to Rage Against the Machine, Audioslave's music was mostly apolitical. Cornell stated he did not want to become the new singer of Rage Against the Machine or any political band, but he would play benefits the other band members wanted to play. Despite his reluctance to write political lyrics, he himself never discounted the possibility; he already touched upon political issues in Audioslave's "Set It Off"—a song inspired by 1999's WTO riots (the "Battle of Seattle")—then later wrote an anti-war song, "Sound of a Gun", and what Morello called "the most political song Audioslave's ever written," "Wide Awake" for Revelations. "Wide Awake" was an attack on the Bush administration's perceived failures over the consequences of Hurricane Katrina.

The band was openly anti-Bush and against the Iraq War from the beginning; on March 17, 2003, only hours after President Bush announced plans to invade Iraq, the band performed live in Hollywood with messages reading "How many Iraqis per gallon?" and "Somewhere in Texas, a Village is Missing an Idiot," scrolled across the stage. The music video for "Doesn't Remind Me" was also critical of the Iraq war. Wilk called Bush "a fucking scam" in an interview, criticizing the Bush administration's rationale for war in Iraq.

During the time of the second album's release, several politically charged Rage Against the Machine songs resurfaced in Audioslave's live set. Although the members committed to not making political statements during their Cuba tour, Commerford stated in an interview that the concert made Audioslave more politically active than Rage Against the Machine ever was. While in Cuba, Cornell said that he takes "every aspect of human life" into consideration, when it comes to writing lyrics, and that he would write about the experience in a song, or more songs. This culminated in the political influences on Revelations, although he did not write about Cuba specifically. He asserted that he felt Audioslave can be a band like U2, which is "not overtly political, but Bono gets a lot done." That year, the band played at two more concerts organized to raise political awareness: Live 8, which aimed to end global poverty, and the Hurricane Katrina benefit concert, ReAct Now: Music & Relief.

Audioslave was prominently involved in the Axis of Justice, a non-profit organization formed by Tom Morello and System of a Down's Serj Tankian to "bring together musicians, fans of music, and grassroots political organizations to fight for social justice." Axis of Justice tents were set up at almost every Audioslave show, and with the exception of Commerford all band members appeared on the Concert Series Volume 1 CD/DVD charity album released in 2004.

== Awards and nominations ==
Award	Year	Nominee(s)	Category	Result	Ref.
Echo Music Prize	2006	Themselves	Best International Alternative	Nominated	
Teen Choice Awards	2003	Themselves	Choice Rock Group	Nominated	
Teen Choice Awards	2003	"Like a Stone"	Choice Rock Track	Nominated	

== Members ==
- Chris Cornell – lead vocals, occasional guitar (2001–2007; 2017, died 2017)
- Tom Morello – guitar (2001–2007; 2017)
- Tim Commerford – bass, backing vocals (2001–2007; 2017)
- Brad Wilk – drums (2001–2007; 2017)

== Discography ==
Studio albums

- Audioslave (2002)
- Out of Exile (2005)
- Revelations (2006)
