= Show Me How to Live (song) =

Single by Audioslave

from the album Audioslave
- B-side: "Super Stupid" (originally performed by Funkadelic; live)
- Released: June 2003
- Recorded: 2002
- Genre: Alternative metal
- Length: 4:37
- Label: Epic
- Songwriters: Brad Wilk; Chris Cornell; Tim Commerford; Tom Morello
- Producer: Rick Rubin

Audioslave singles chronology
"Like a Stone" (2003)	"Show Me How to Live" (2003)	"I Am the Highway" (2003)

Music video
- "Show Me How to Live" on YouTube

Screenshot from the music video

"Show Me How to Live" is a song by the American rock supergroup Audioslave. It was released in June 2003 as the third single from their first album, Audioslave, released in 2003. It peaked at number 67 on the Billboard Hot 100 singles chart, number 2 on the Mainstream Rock Tracks and number 4 in the Modern Rock Tracks.

== Composition ==
The song is played at a tempo of roughly 90 BPM and contains heavy guitar and drum riffs and a solo broken up with a phasing, fluttering effect by Tom Morello, achieved by tremolo picking the high E-string, and using a combination of his trademark Dunlop Cry Baby wah pedal and a ring modulator effect. Lead vocalist Chris Cornell achieves an unusual effect by repeatedly striking his throat with the side of his hand while changing pitch.

The band cited Mary Shelley's Frankenstein as an inspiration for the lyrics, including "nail in my head" in the chorus.

== Track listing ==
1. "Show Me How to Live"
2. "Super Stupid" (Funkadelic cover) (Live BBC Radio 1 Session).
3. "Like a Stone" (Live BBC Radio 1 Session).
4. "Gasoline" (Live BBC Radio 1 Session).

7" single

1. "Show Me How to Live"
2. "Super Stupid" (Funkadelic cover) (Live BBC Radio 1 Session).

== Music video ==
The music video for the song is made of clips from the 1971 film Vanishing Point in which a white 1970 Dodge Challenger driven by a drug addict from Denver to San Francisco is involved in several car chases with police cars and motorcycles, and a Jaguar E-Type. The clips of a radio DJ (played by Cleavon Little) singing and dancing to 1970 music have been synchronized to the Audioslave song. Other parts have been remade with the band members, in the car driven by Cornell, and playing in front of a small audience in the Nevada desert. The movie, and the video, ends with the muscle car deliberately crashing into a bulldozer road block set up by police.

Two Challengers were used during the filming of the video, one of which was given away in a contest put on by the band. Cornell and the band's drummer, Brad Wilk, autographed the inside of the trunk of this car. The video was filmed in Los Angeles, California, and was produced by Allan Wachs and directed by AV Club.

== Personnel ==
- Tim Commerford – bass guitar
- Chris Cornell – vocals
- Tom Morello – guitar
- Brad Wilk – drums
- Rick Rubin – producer

== Charts ==
Chart (2003)	Peak position
US Billboard Hot 100	67
US Alternative Airplay (Billboard)	4
US Mainstream Rock (Billboard)	2

Chart (2017)	Peak position
UK Rock & Metal (OCC)	22
US Hot Rock & Alternative Songs (Billboard)	20

== Certifications ==
Region	Certification	Certified units/sales
New Zealand (RMNZ)	Platinum	30,000^{‡}
^{‡} Sales+streaming figures based on certification alone.
