= Brad Wilk =

American drummer (born 1968)

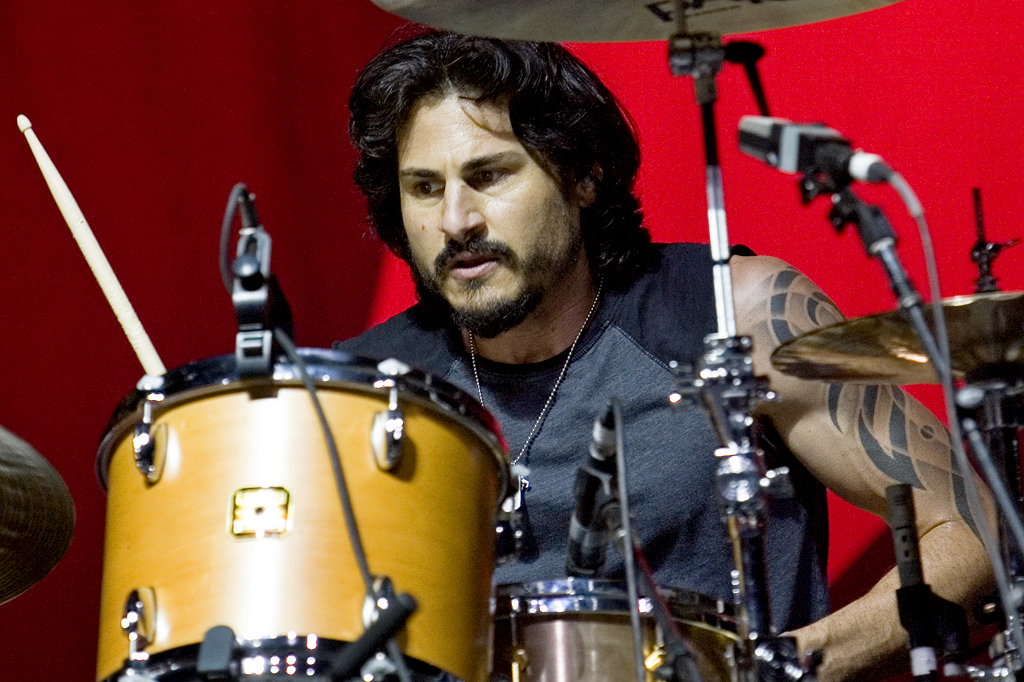
- Wilk performing in Lisbon, Portugal in 2008

Background information
- Born: September 5, 1968 (age 58); Portland, Oregon, U.S.
- Genres: Alternative metal; rap metal; funk metal; alternative rock; hard rock
- Occupation: Drummer
- Years active: 1990–present
- Formerly of: Rage Against the Machine; Audioslave; Prophets of Rage; Greta; Sound City Players; The Smashing Pumpkins
- Spouse: Selene Vigil (m. 2005; div. 2013)

Brad Wilk (born September 5, 1968) is an American drummer. He is best known as a member of the rock bands Rage Against the Machine (1991–2000, 2007–2011, 2019–2024), Audioslave (2001–2007, 2017), and Prophets of Rage (2016–2019).

Wilk started his career as a drummer for Greta in 1990, and helped co-found Rage Against the Machine with Tom Morello and Zack de la Rocha in August 1991. Following that band's breakup in October 2000, Wilk, Morello, Rage Against the Machine bassist Tim Commerford and Soundgarden frontman Chris Cornell formed the supergroup Audioslave, which broke up in 2007. From 2016 to 2019, he played in the band Prophets of Rage, with Commerford, Morello, Chuck D, B-Real and DJ Lord. He has played with Rage Against the Machine since their reunion.

Wilk has also performed drums on English metal band Black Sabbath's final album 13, released in June 2013. He tried out for Pearl Jam shortly after the release of their debut album Ten and had previously been in the band Indian Style with Eddie Vedder.

== Early life ==
Wilk was born on September 5, 1968, in Portland, Oregon. His father was Jewish and of Polish-Jewish descent, while his mother was a practicing Catholic. He was raised in Chicago, Illinois, before his family settled in Southern California. He started to play the drums when he was thirteen years old. Wilk attended William Howard Taft High School, in the Woodland Hills neighborhood of Los Angeles, and graduated in 1986. While the high school was in an upper middle-class neighborhood, as part of LAUSD, hundreds of students (including rapper and actor Ice Cube) from lower-income and more racially diverse neighborhoods attended Taft High School through a busing program. In terms of music, he has cited John Bonham, Keith Moon, Neil Peart, and Elvin Jones as his greatest influences. Wilk was a fan of Van Halen in his youth.

== Career ==
=== Rage Against the Machine (1991–2000, 2007–2011, 2019–2024) ===
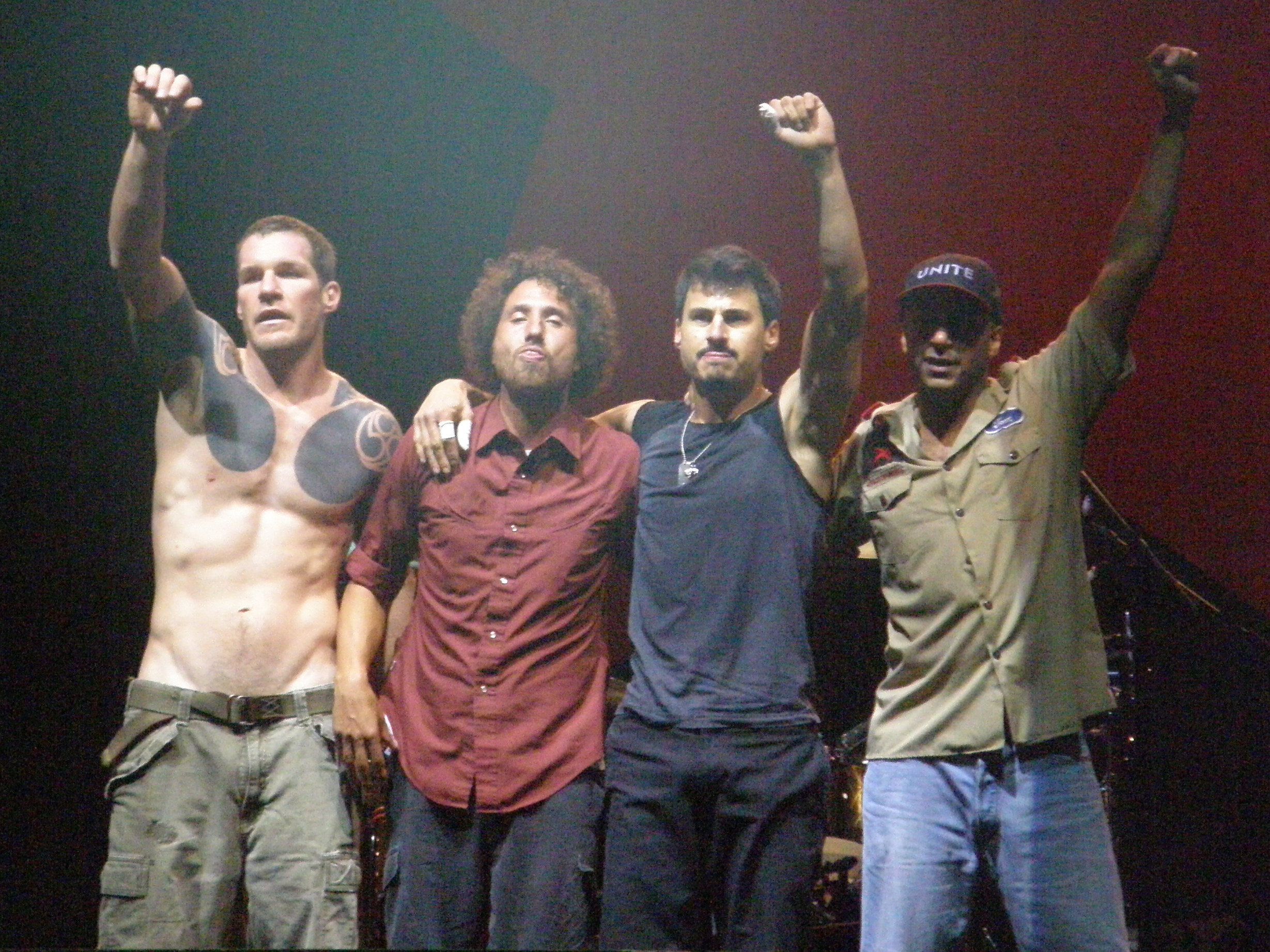
Wilk (second from right) with Rage Against the Machine in 2007

Wilk's success as the drummer of Rage Against the Machine came from the failure of a different band; he once auditioned for a band called Lock Up, who released one album (titled Something Bitchin' This Way Comes) through Geffen records in 1989 and broke up when the album received little media attention upon release. Former Lock Up guitarist Tom Morello was looking to pick up where Lock Up left off and start a new band, and contacted Wilk, who was playing with the band Greta, to see if he was interested in playing the drums. A short while after, the duo met Zack de la Rocha while he was rapping freestyle in a club, and through him, bassist Tim Commerford (a childhood friend of de la Rocha). The band played two shows in 1991, and spent 1992 frequenting the L. A. club circuit, during which they signed a record deal with Epic Records, and released their self-titled debut album that November. They quickly achieved commercial success and would go on to release three more studio albums – Evil Empire in 1996, The Battle of Los Angeles in 1999, and Renegades in 2000 – before disbanding in October 2000.

Rage Against the Machine reunited to play at the Coachella Music Festival in Coachella, California on January 22, 2007. On April 29, 2007, Rage Against the Machine reunited at the Coachella Music Festival (Rage Against the Machine reunion tour). The band played in front of an EZLN backdrop to the largest crowds of the festival. Initially thought to be a one-time event, the band played seven more shows that year in the United States (including their first non-festival concert in seven years at the Alpine Valley Music Theater in East Troy, Wisconsin), and in January 2008, they played their first shows outside of the U.S. as part of the Big Day Out Festival in Australia and New Zealand. The band continued to tour around the world, headlining many large festivals in Europe and the United States, including Lollapalooza in Chicago. After a brief South America tour in 2010, they created their own festival, LA Rising, which they headlined on July 30, 2011. In November 2012, they released a XX anniversary boxset of their first album. In April 2014, Wilk indicated LA Rising would be Rage's final show.

On November 1, 2019, it was reported that Rage Against the Machine would be reuniting a second time, and were to perform at the 2020 Coachella Valley Music and Arts Festival before it was canceled due to the COVID-19 pandemic. On February 10, 2020, the band announced dates and locations for their worldwide Public Service Announcement Tour, which was postponed due to the pandemic. On January 3, 2024 Wilk announced that the band will not be touring or playing live again, confirming the band had once again disbanded.

=== Audioslave (2001–2007, 2017) ===
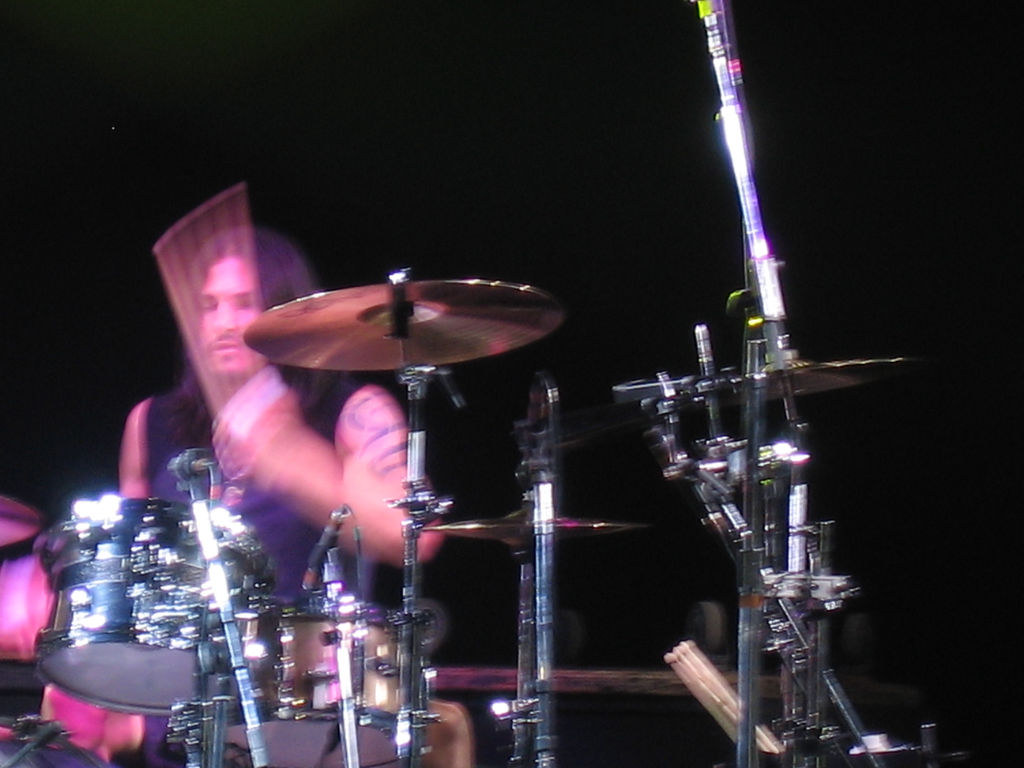
Wilk performing with Audioslave at the Montreux Jazz Festival in 2005

After de la Rocha left Rage Against the Machine in October 2000, the remaining members formed Audioslave with former Soundgarden frontman Chris Cornell. The band released their self-titled debut album in 2002. Their second album, Out of Exile, was released in 2005 and debuted at the number one position on the Billboard 200. It was followed by Revelations in 2006. Compared to Rage Against the Machine, the majority of Audioslave's music was apolitical. After several months of inactivity, Audioslave formally disbanded in February 2007 when Cornell left to focus on his solo career.

=== Prophets of Rage (2016–2019) ===
In 2016, Wilk reunited with Morello and Commerford, joining Chuck D, B-Real and DJ Lord to form the supergroup Prophets of Rage. The band played original material as well as covers of songs by Rage Against the Machine, Public Enemy and Cypress Hill. Their debut tour was entitled "Make America Rage Again" to protest Donald Trump's policies and the 2016 American presidential election.

During its three years, the band released one EP in 2016, The Party's Over, and one eponymous full-length studio album in 2017. Prophets of Rage disbanded in 2019 with the confirmation of the 2020 reunion of Rage Against the Machine.

=== Other projects ===
Having established himself as a session musician, Wilk has also contributed drums on the Black Sabbath album 13, which was released in June 2013. In late 2013, Wilk joined the band The Last Internationale and recorded their debut album called We Will Reign with producer Brendan O'Brien. The record was released in August 2014.

To the end of 2014 until June 2015, Brad Wilk was playing drums on tour with the Smashing Pumpkins along with Billy Corgan, Jeff Schroeder and also Mark Stoermer on bass. On February 26, 2015, while touring Australia with the band, he joined the Foo Fighters on stage at Sydney's Olympic (ANZ) stadium playing drums for a Van Halen cover Ain't Talkin' 'bout Love. On August 3, 2015, Wilk sat-in with The 8G Band on Late Night with Seth Meyers.

== Personal life ==
Wilk was diagnosed with type 1 diabetes in 1997, and is active in raising money for diabetes awareness. He has donated about $12,000 to the Orange County chapter of the Juvenile Diabetes Research Foundation (JDRF).

Wilk developed Olade, a sugar-free lemonade, which Food and Drug Administration in 2009 approved as a non-dietary supplement.

Wilk was married to Selene Vigil, with whom he had two children. She filed for divorce in 2013.

== Discography ==
Rage Against the Machine studio albums

Main article: Rage Against the Machine discography

Year	Title
1992	Rage Against the Machine: Released: November 11, 1992; Label: Epic
1996	Evil Empire: Released: April 16, 1996; Label: Epic
1999	The Battle of Los Angeles: Released: November 2, 1999; Label: Epic
2000	Renegades: Released: December 5, 2000; Label: Epic

Audioslave studio albums

Main article: Audioslave discography

Year	Title
2002	Audioslave: Released: November 19, 2002; Label: Interscope/Epic
2005	Out of Exile: Released: May 24, 2005; Label: Interscope/Epic
2006	Revelations: Released: September 5, 2006; Label: Interscope/Epic

Black Sabbath studio albums

Main article: Black Sabbath discography

Year	Title
2013	13: Released: June 10, 2013; Label: Vertigo, Universal
2016	The End

The Last Internationale studio albums

Main article: The Last Internationale

Year	Title
2014	We Will Reign: Released: August 19, 2014; Label: Epic

Prophets of Rage studio albums

Year	Title
2017	Prophets of Rage: Released: September 15, 2017; Label: Caroline
