= Rage Against the Machine reunion tour =

2007–11 concert tour by Rage Against the Machine

- World tour by Rage Against the Machine
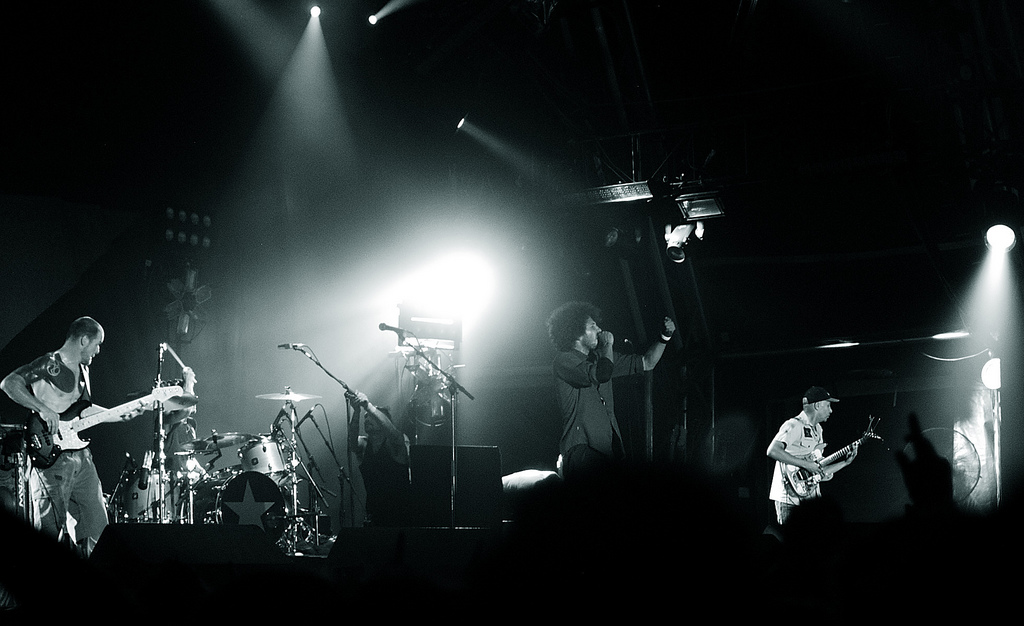
- RATM performing at the Big Day Out in 2008
- Location: North America; Europe; Asia; Australia; South America
- Start date: April 29, 2007
- End date: July 30, 2011
- Legs: 6
- No. of shows: 50

Rage Against the Machine concert chronology
- The Battle of Los Angeles Tour (1999–2000); Reunion Tour (2007–2011); Public Service Announcement Tour (2022)

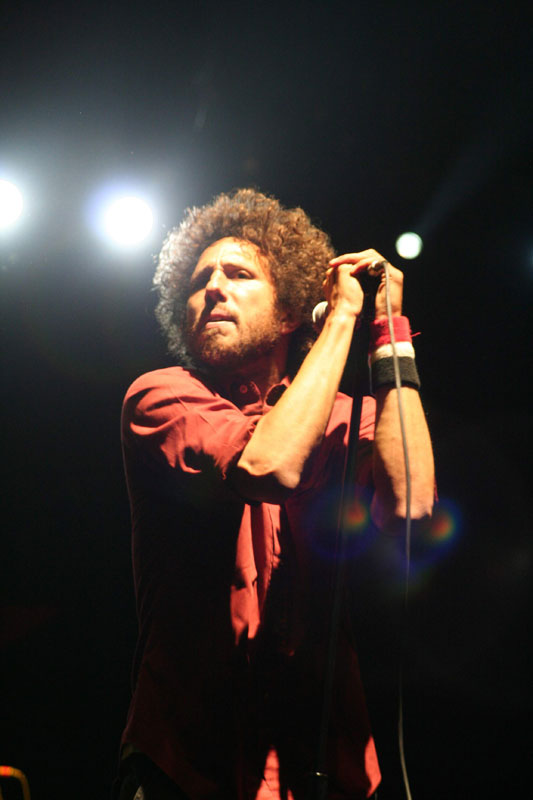
Zack de la Rocha performing with Rage Against the Machine in Indio, California on April 29, 2007

The Rage Against the Machine reunion tour was a concert tour by American rock band Rage Against the Machine that took place from 2007 to 2011. It was the first tour for the band since they broke up in 2000. This tour saw Rage Against the Machine performing live worldwide sporadically for four years, with the exception of 2009, before going back on hiatus; the band would not tour again until 2022.

== History ==
Rumors that Rage Against the Machine could reunite at the Coachella Valley Music and Arts Festival were circulating in mid-January 2007, and were confirmed on January 22. The band was confirmed to be headlining the final day of Coachella 2007. The reunion was described by Morello as primarily being a vehicle to voice the band's opposition to the "right-wing purgatory" the United States has "slid into" under the George W. Bush administration since RATM's dissolution.

On April 14, 2007, Morello and de la Rocha reunited onstage early to perform a brief acoustic set at a Coalition of Immokalee Workers rally in downtown Chicago. Morello described the event as "very exciting for everybody in the room, myself included." This was followed by the scheduled Coachella performance on Sunday, April 29 where the band staged a much anticipated performance to the largest crowds of the festival. This was originally thought of as a one-off show, which later turned out to be untrue. The band later played four shows in the Hip Hop festival Rock the Bells with the Wu Tang Clan, Public Enemy and Cypress Hill, and later an additional night in New York City after the first night sold out in 20 minutes. Rage also played their first (non-festival) concert in seven years at the Alpine Valley Music Theater in East Troy, Wisconsin, supported by Queens of the Stone Age in August 2007. The band played co-headlining spots at New Orleans' Voodoo Music Experience in late October and the Vegoose Festival in Las Vegas. These shows were the last performances by the band in 2007.

On January 18, 2008, the band played their first show outside of the U.S. since their reunion in Auckland, New Zealand, as part of the Big Day Out festival series. The band also played seven shows in Australia including several headlining shows in Melbourne, Sydney, Adelaide, and Perth. The band has since continued to tour around the world, headlining many large festivals in Europe and the United States, including Lollapalooza in Chicago, Illinois. In 2008 the band also played shows in Denver, Colorado and St. Paul, Minnesota; the locations of the Democratic National Convention and Republican National Convention, respectively.

In December 2008, PremierGuitar.com conducted an interview with Tom Morello and when asked about his plans for 2009 he replied:

"Well, I know for sure that I'll be doing a lot of Nightwatchman dates in the coming year and continuing the Axis of Justice organization that I run with Serj Tankian. I got a pretty large cache of Nightwatchman songs that I haven't released yet so I'll definitely continue writing and recording. Also, I had a great time playing Rage Against the Machine shows over the course of the year and half and I have no doubt that we'll continue to do more of those in the future."

In 2009, Morello also went on to work with his nonprofit, Axis of Justice.

Another leg was added for Europe in 2010. The leg included dates at indoor arenas, and outdoor festivals. The band also headlined the Download Festival at Donington Park, on June 12. On July 23, Rage performed at a benefit concert at the Hollywood Palladium theater in their hometown of Los Angeles to protest against the Arizona SB 1070 law. It was their first U.S. show in two years and according to guitarist Tom Morello it will be their only show in the U.S. for the year. In late 2010 they also completed a short three-date South American tour, including a headline set at the SWU Music & Arts Festival. This was the first time they had played in that continent.

Morello stated, the only Rage appearance for 2011 was a performance on July 30 at the L.A. Rising festival with El Gran Silencio, Immortal Technique, Lauryn Hill, Rise Against and Muse. Morello hoped that Rage Against the Machine would tour in 2012 to commemorate the 20th anniversary of their self-titled debut album, but this never came to fruition.

On July 30, 2013, exactly two years after its original performance, it was announced on the L.A. Rising's Facebook page that the festival would once again take place in August 2014. Multiple sources reported that Rage Against the Machine would participate in the festival. However, this never happened.

On October 16, 2015, the 2010 gig in Finsbury Park was released as a DVD and Blu-ray titled Live at Finsbury Park.

=== Setlist ===
Throughout the entirety of the reunion tour, the band's setlist was usually of the same structure for every show. The band played various songs at different shows. On each leg of the tour, the band played a new song(s) and added them regularly to the setlist. At a regular performance, the band would play 14 or 15 songs, including an encore.

North American leg
- Testify
- Bulls on Parade
- People of the Sun
- Know Your Enemy
- Vietnow
- Bullet in the Head
- Down Rodeo
- Tire Me
- Guerrilla Radio
- Calm Like a Bomb
- Sleep Now in the Fire
- Wake Up (with Speech)

Encore

- Freedom (with Township Rebellion snippet)
- Killing in the Name
Australian/Japan leg

The Internationale
Intro song to all shows on this leg of the tour.

- Testify
- Bulls on Parade
- People of the Sun
- Bombtrack
- Vietnow
- Bullet in the Head
- Know Your Enemy
- Renegades of Funk
- Guerrilla Radio
- Calm Like a Bomb
- Sleep Now in the Fire
- War Within a Breath

Encore

- Freedom (with Township Rebellion snippet)
- Killing In The Name
European leg

Guantanamo Bay Intro
In occasion in Europe, and in Minneapolis, the band opened the show dressed like Guantanamo Bay prisoners and performed the first song in these costumes.

- Bombtrack

Main Set

- Testify
- Bulls on Parade
- People of the Sun
- Know Your Enemy
- Bullet in the Head
- Jam (Known as 'Katrina Jam' among fans)
- Born Of A Broken Man
- Clampdown (The Clash Cover)
- Guerrilla Radio
- Ashes in the Fall
- Calm Like a Bomb
- Sleep Now in the Fire
- Wake Up (with Speech)

Encore 1
While the band were offstage, The Internationale was played.

- Freedom (with Township Rebellion snippet)
- Killing in the Name

Encore 2

- Tire Me
- War Within A Breath

=== Songs played ===
- Testify
- Bulls on Parade
- People of the Sun
- Bombtrack
- Know Your Enemy
- Bullet in the Head
- Born of a Broken Man
- Clampdown (The Clash cover)
- Vietnow
- Without a Face (played once in Portugal)
- Down Rodeo
- Kick Out the Jams (played original MC5 version with Wayne Kramer)
- Tire Me
- Guerrilla Radio
- White Riot (The Clash cover)
- No Shelter (played once in San Bernardino)
- Renegades of Funk
- Ashes in the Fall
- Take the Power Back (played once at Alpine Valley Music Theatre)
- Calm Like a Bomb
- Sleep Now in the Fire
- War Within a Breath
- Wake Up
- Freedom (with Township Rebellion Snippet)
- Killing in the Name
- Year of tha Boomerang (played once at Rock im Park)
- Katrina Song (played once at the Target Center in Minneapolis, MN)
- Canción del minero (Víctor Jara cover) (played once in Chile)

== Tour dates ==
Date	City	Country	Venue
2007 North American leg
April 29, 2007	Indio	United States	Coachella Valley Music and Arts Festival
July 28, 2007	New York City	United States	Rock the Bells
July 29, 2007	New York City	United States	Rock the Bells
August 11, 2007	San Bernardino	United States	Rock the Bells
August 18, 2007	San Francisco	United States	Rock the Bells
August 24, 2007	East Troy	United States	Alpine Valley Music Theatre
October 26, 2007	New Orleans	United States	Voodoo Music Experience
October 28, 2007	Las Vegas	United States	Vegoose
2008 New Zealand/Australian/Japan leg
January 18, 2008	Auckland	New Zealand	Big Day Out
January 20, 2008	Gold Coast	Australia	Big Day Out
January 22, 2008	Sydney	Australia	Sydney Entertainment Centre
January 25, 2008	Sydney	Australia	Big Day Out
January 28, 2008	Melbourne	Australia	Big Day Out
January 30, 2008	Melbourne	Australia	Festival Hall
February 1, 2008	Adelaide	Australia	Big Day Out
February 3, 2008	Perth	Australia	Big Day Out
February 7, 2008	Osaka	Japan	Osaka Castle Hall
February 9, 2008	Tokyo	Japan	Makuhari Messe
February 10, 2008	Tokyo	Japan	Makuhari Messe
2008 European leg
May 30, 2008	Madrid	Spain	Electric Weekend
June 1, 2008	Landgraaf	Netherlands	Pinkpop Festival
June 2, 2008	Antwerp	Belgium	Sportpaleis
June 4, 2008	Paris	France	Palais omnisports de Paris-Bercy
June 6, 2008	Nürburgring	Germany	Rock am Ring
June 7, 2008	Nuremberg	Germany	Rock im Park
June 10, 2008	Berlin	Germany	Zitadelle
June 12, 2008	Hultsfred	Sweden	Hultsfred Festival
June 14, 2008	Modena	Italy	Stadio Alberto Braglia
June 15, 2008	Nickelsdorf	Austria	Nova Rock Festival
July 10, 2008	Lisbon	Portugal	Optimus Alive!
July 12, 2008	Balado	Scotland	T in the Park
July 13, 2008	County Kildare	Ireland	Oxegen 2008
2008 North American/European leg
August 2, 2008	Chicago	United States	Lollapalooza
August 20, 2008	Paris	France	Rock en Seine
August 22, 2008	Reading	England	Reading Festival
August 23, 2008	Leeds	England	Leeds Festival
August 27, 2008	Denver	United States	Tent State Music Festival to End the War
September 3, 2008	Minneapolis	United States	Target Center
Europe
June 3, 2010	Nuremberg	Germany	Rock im Park
June 4, 2010	Nürburgring	Germany	Rock am Ring
June 6, 2010	London	England	Finsbury Park
June 8, 2010	Dublin	Ireland	O_{2} Arena
June 9, 2010	Arnhem	Netherlands	GelreDome
June 11, 2010	Madrid	Spain	Rock in Rio
June 12, 2010	Donington Park	England	Download Festival
North America
July 23, 2010	Los Angeles	United States	Hollywood Palladium
South America
October 9, 2010	Itu	Brazil	SWU Music & Arts
October 11, 2010	Santiago	Chile	Maquinaria festival
October 13, 2010	Buenos Aires	Argentina	Costanera Sur
North America
July 30, 2011	Los Angeles	United States	Los Angeles Memorial Coliseum (L.A. Rising Festival)
