= List of songs recorded by Rage Against the Machine =

List of songs by Rage Against the Machine

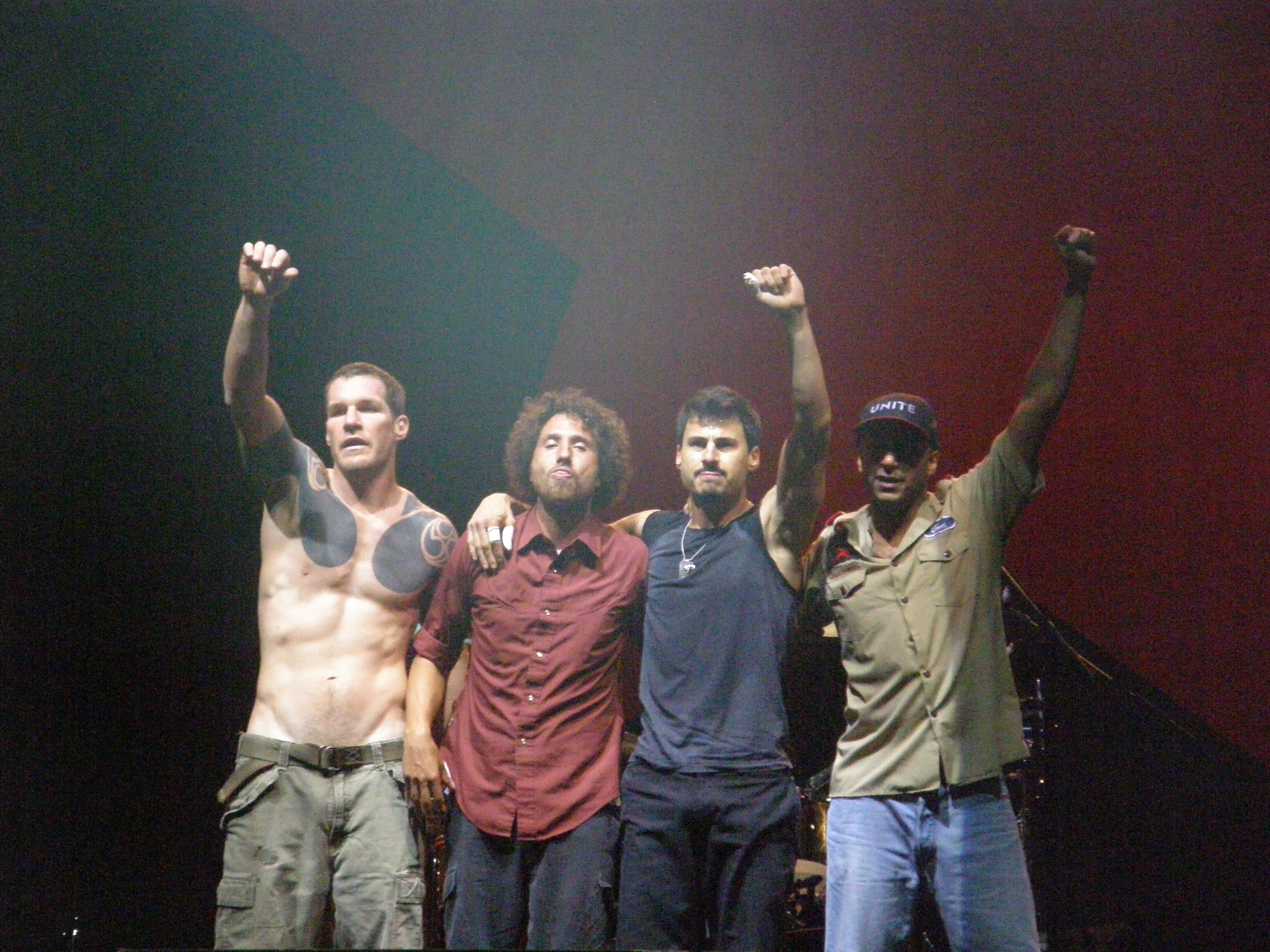
Rage Against the Machine in 2007

Rage Against the Machine was an American rock band from Los Angeles, California. Formed in 1991, the group consisted of vocalist Zack de la Rocha, guitarist Tom Morello, bassist Tim Commerford and drummer Brad Wilk. After a self-issued demo, the band signed with Epic Records and released its self-titled debut album Rage Against the Machine in 1992, the material for which was written by all four members of the group. After contributing the single "Year of tha Boomerang" to the Higher Learning soundtrack in 1995, the band released its second studio album Evil Empire in 1996, on which "Year of tha Boomerang" was featured as the closing track.

In 1997 the band released a cover version of Bruce Springsteen's "The Ghost of Tom Joad", and the following year contributed "No Shelter" to the soundtrack to the film Godzilla, as well as releasing it as a single. In 1999 the band released its final album of original material, The Battle of Los Angeles, which again credited all four members equally for songwriting. The group disbanded in October 2000, after de la Rocha departed to focus on producing his first solo album. After the group's breakup, Epic released Renegades in December 2000, which featured cover versions of songs originally recorded by several hip hop artists, rock bands and other artists.

== Songs ==
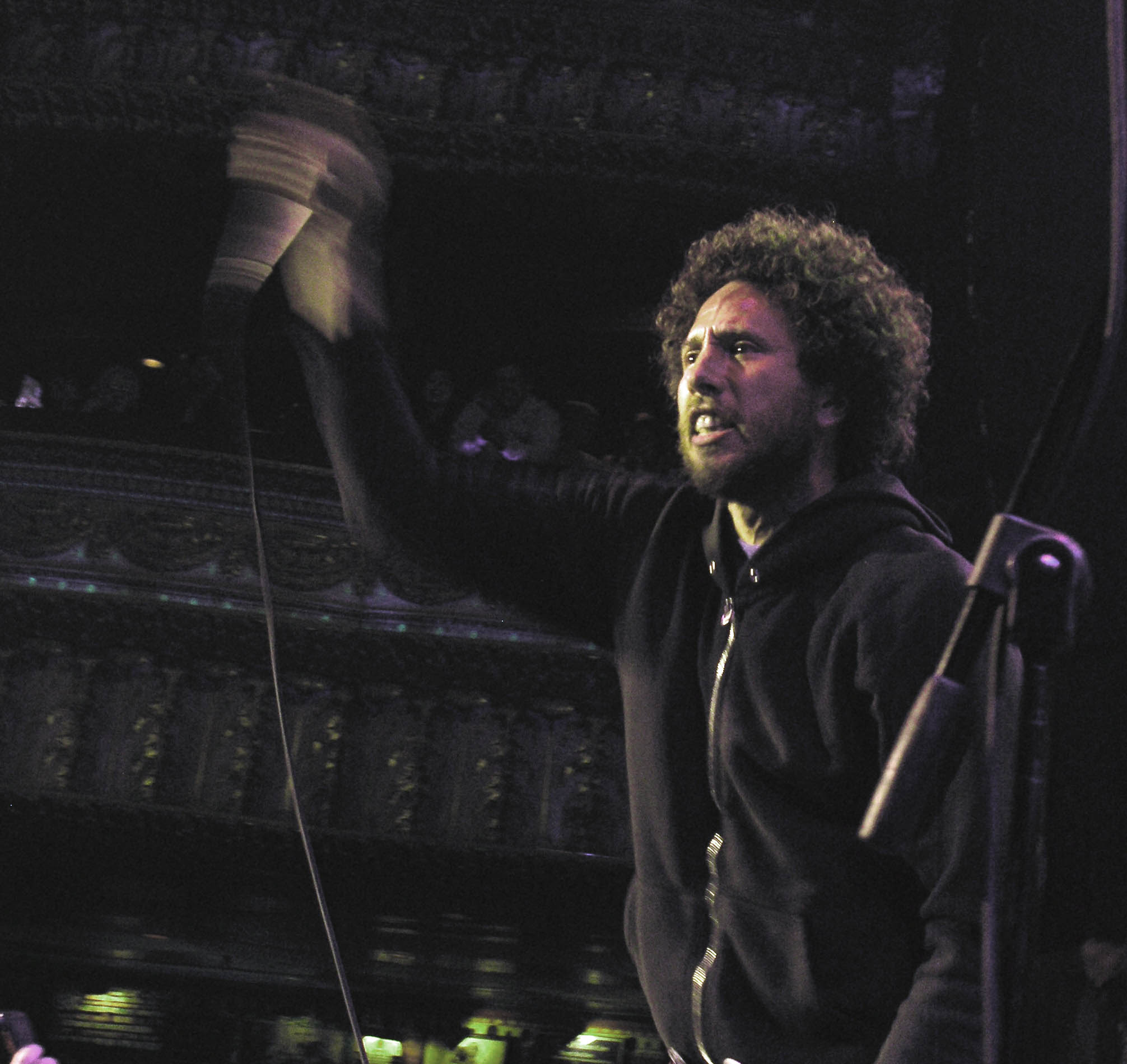
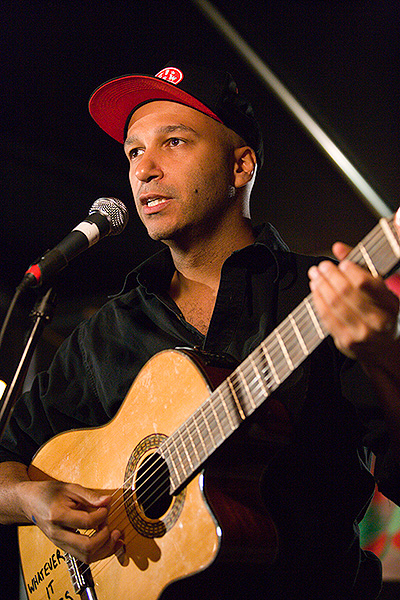
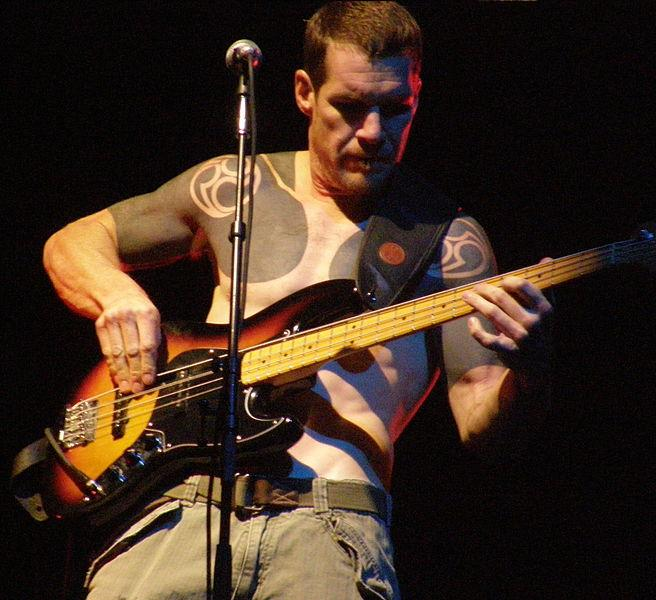
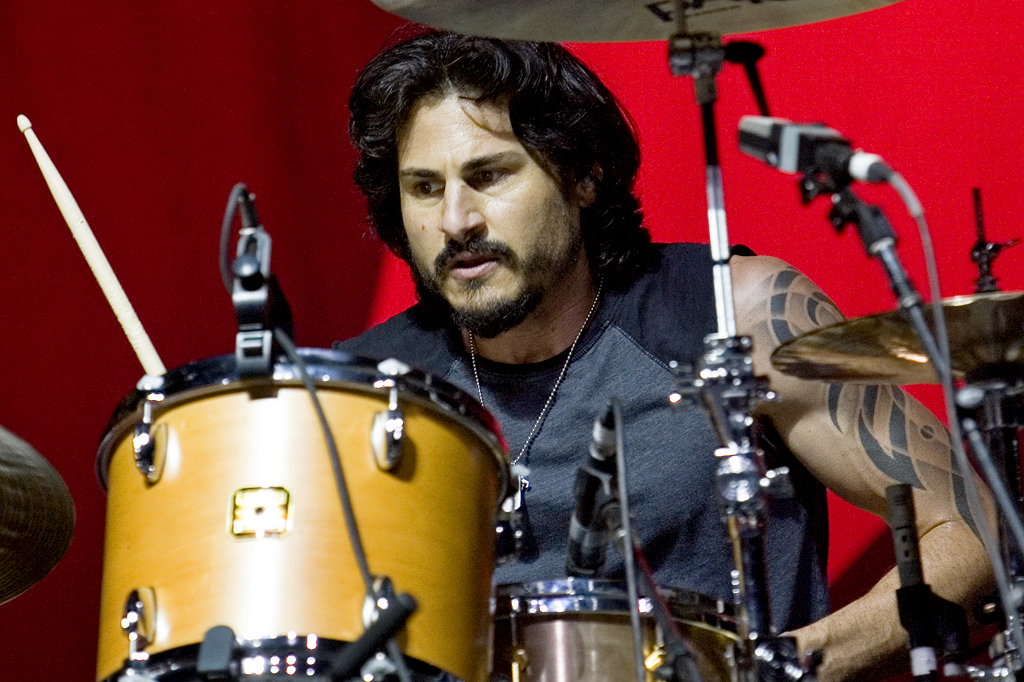
All four members of Rage Against the Machine – from top to bottom, Zack de la Rocha, Tom Morello, Tim Commerford and Brad Wilk – were credited equally for songwriting on the band's material.

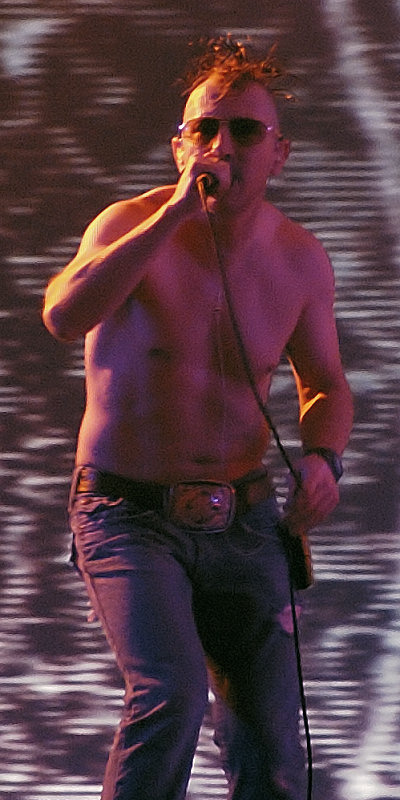
"Know Your Enemy" features additional vocals by Maynard James Keenan.

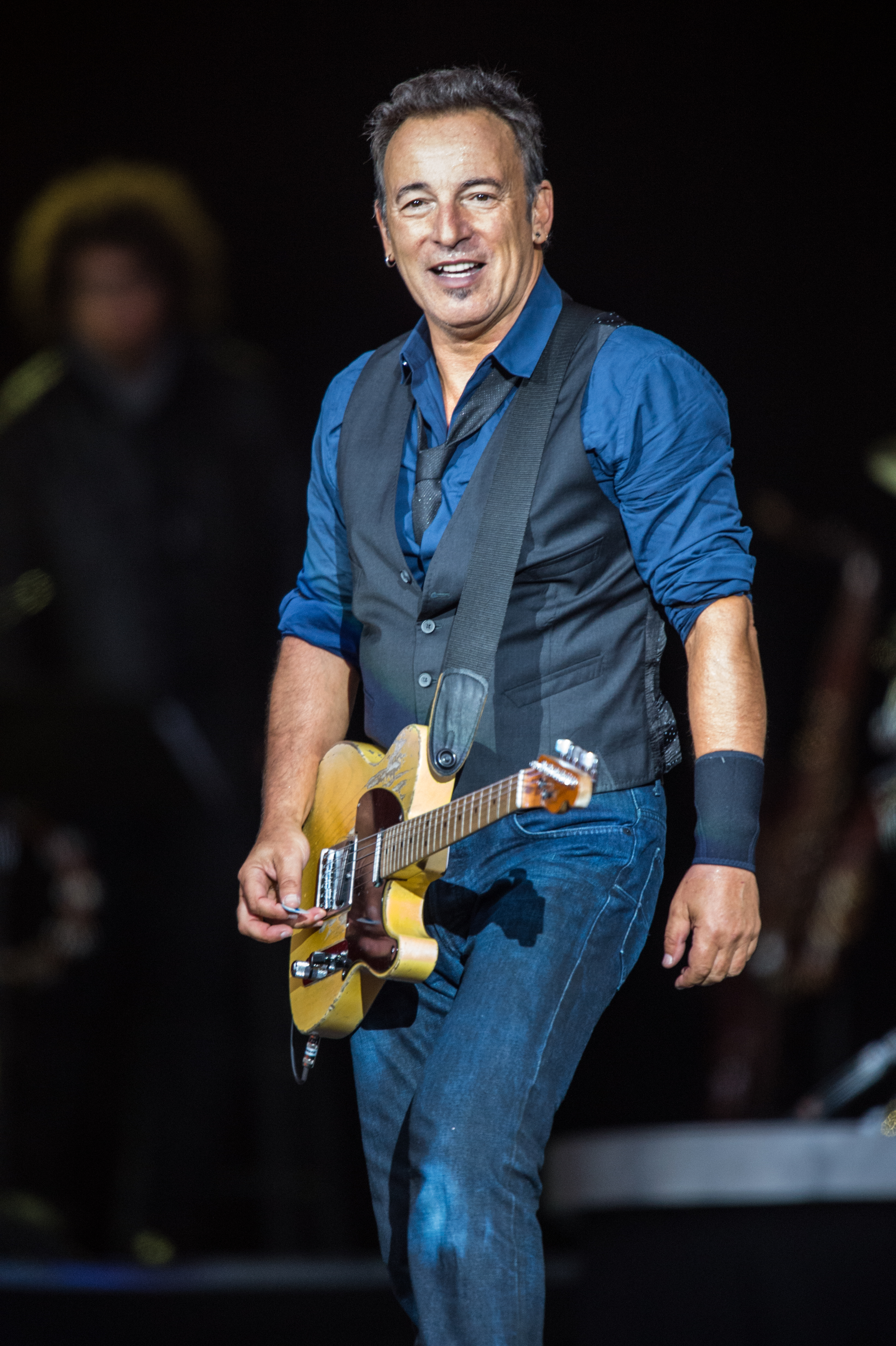
The band released a cover version of Bruce Springsteen's "The Ghost of Tom Joad" as a single in 1997.

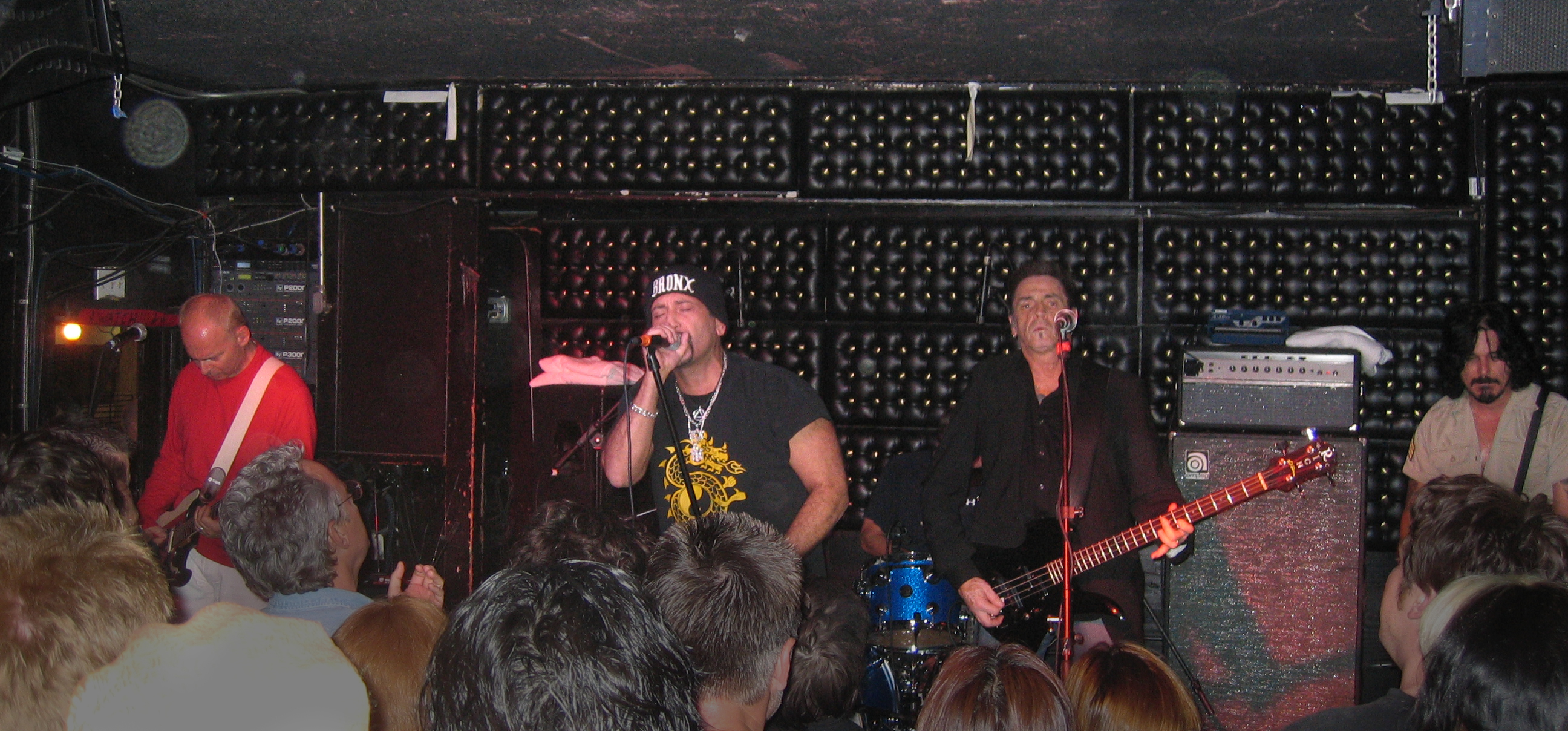
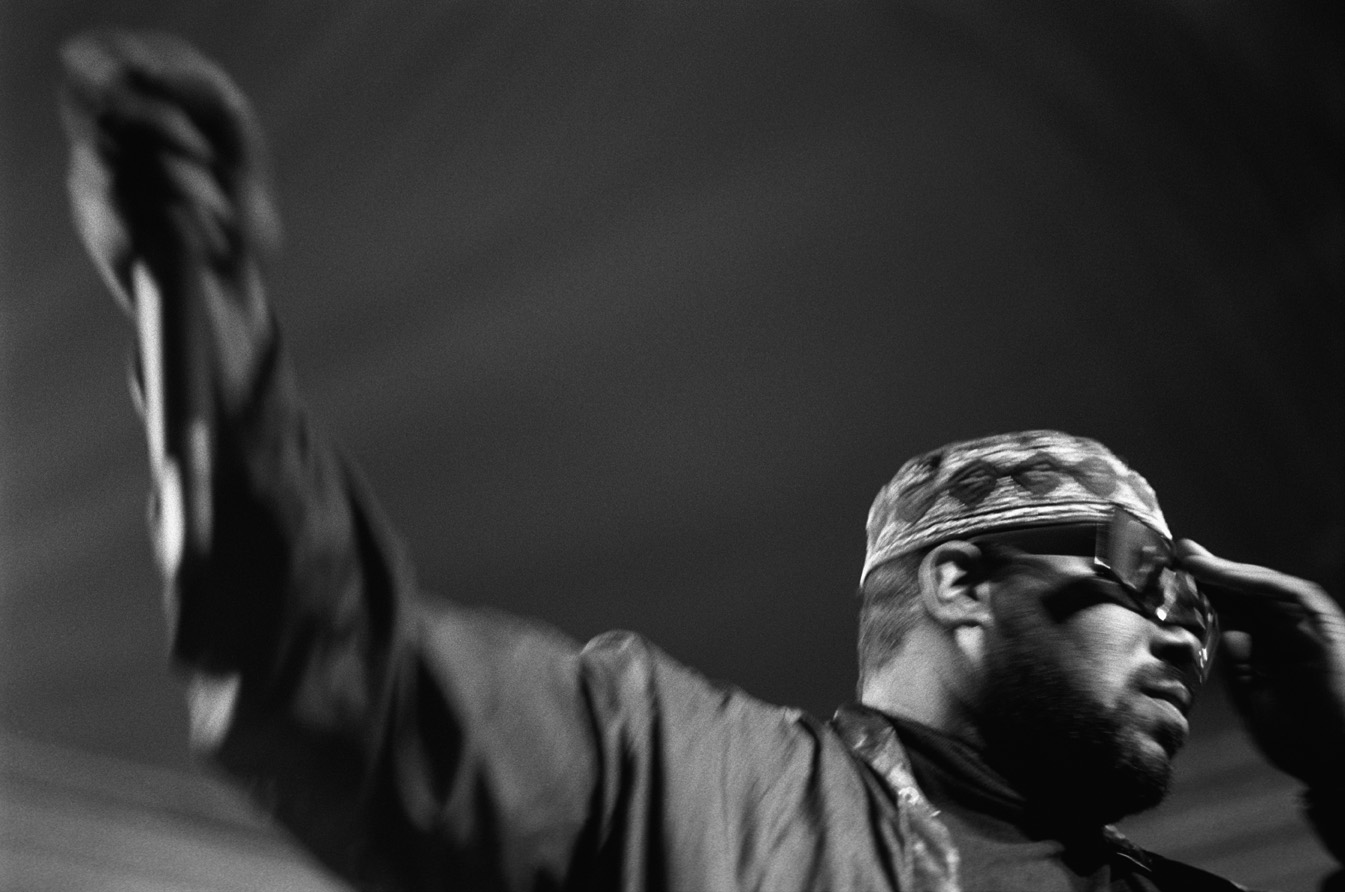
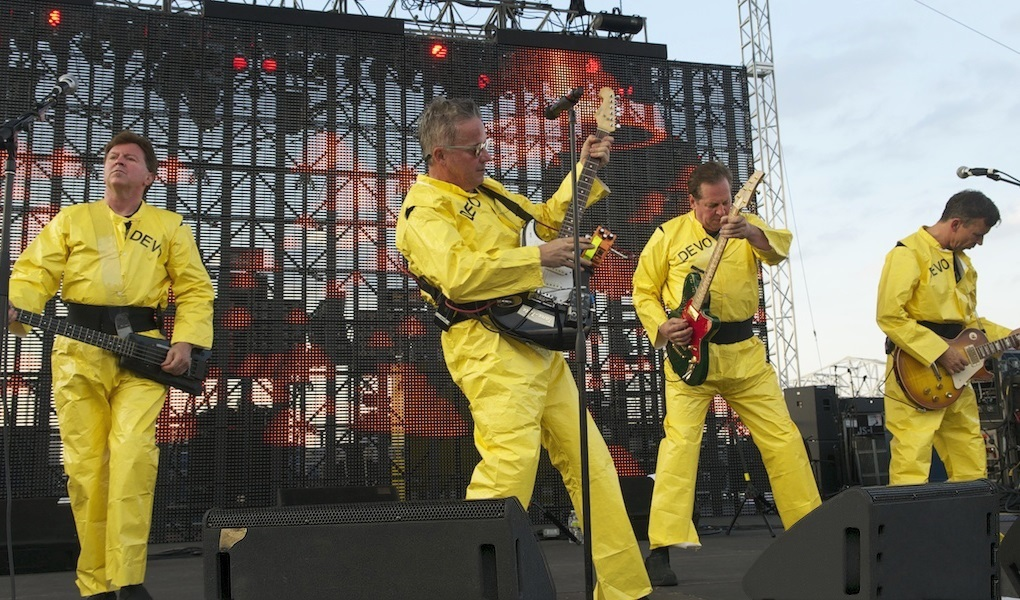
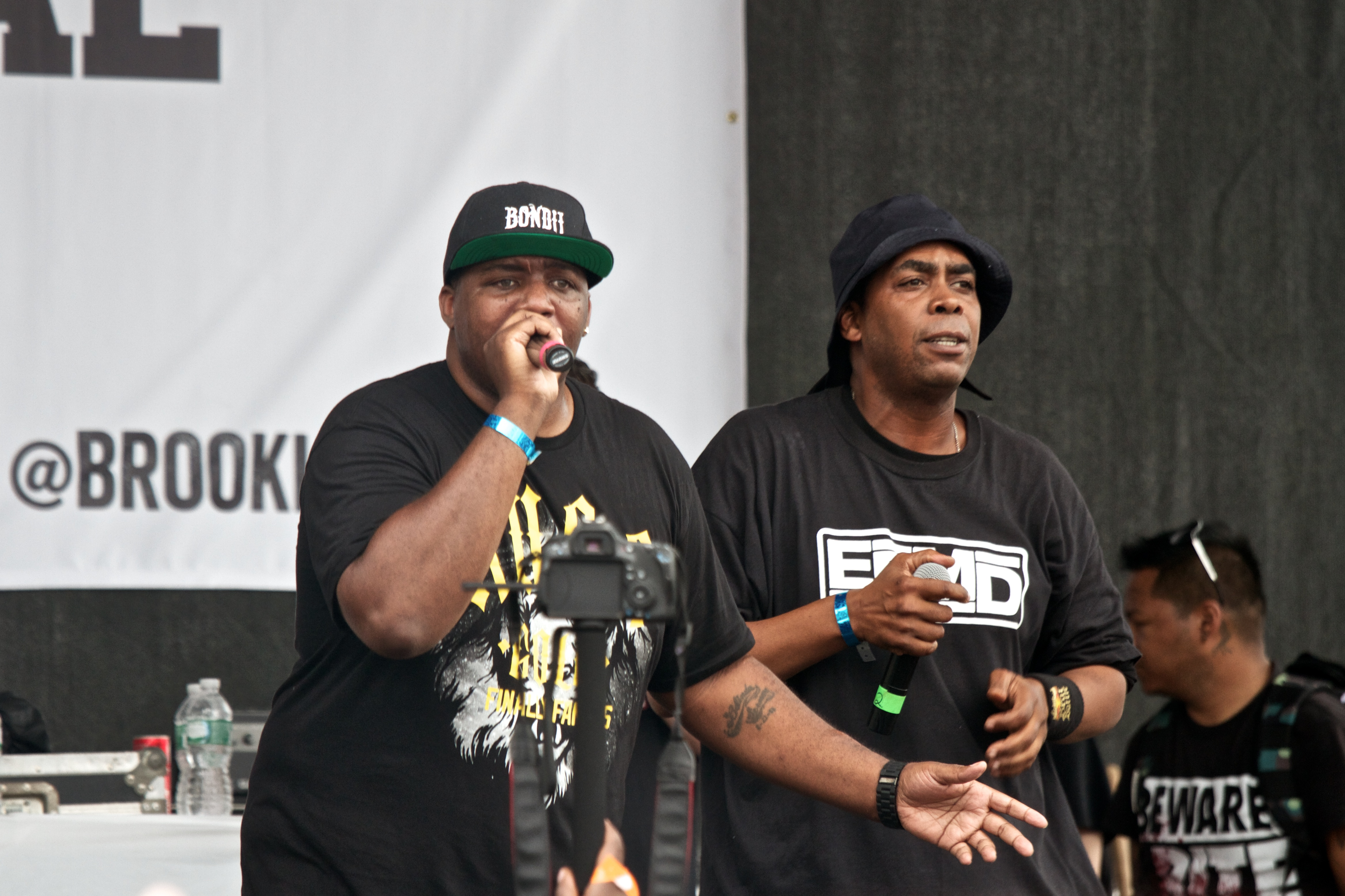
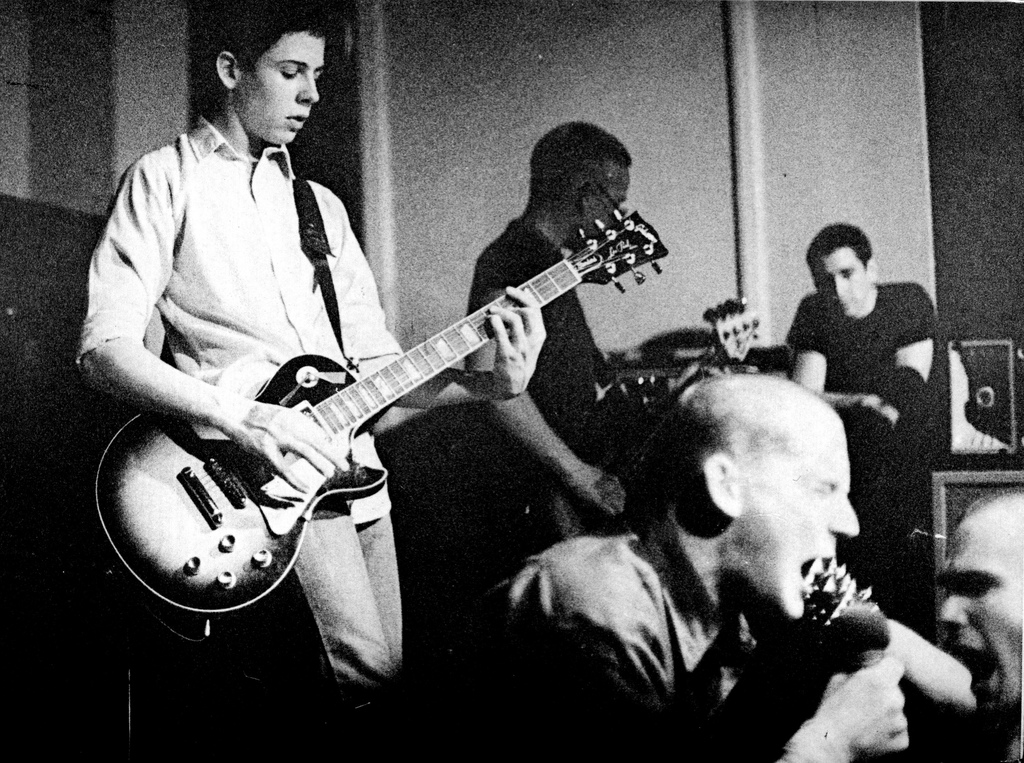
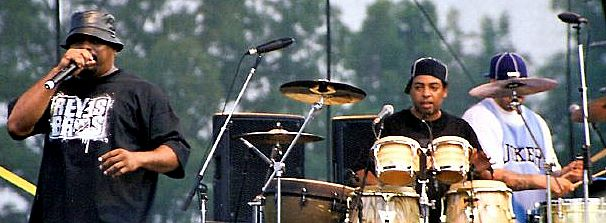
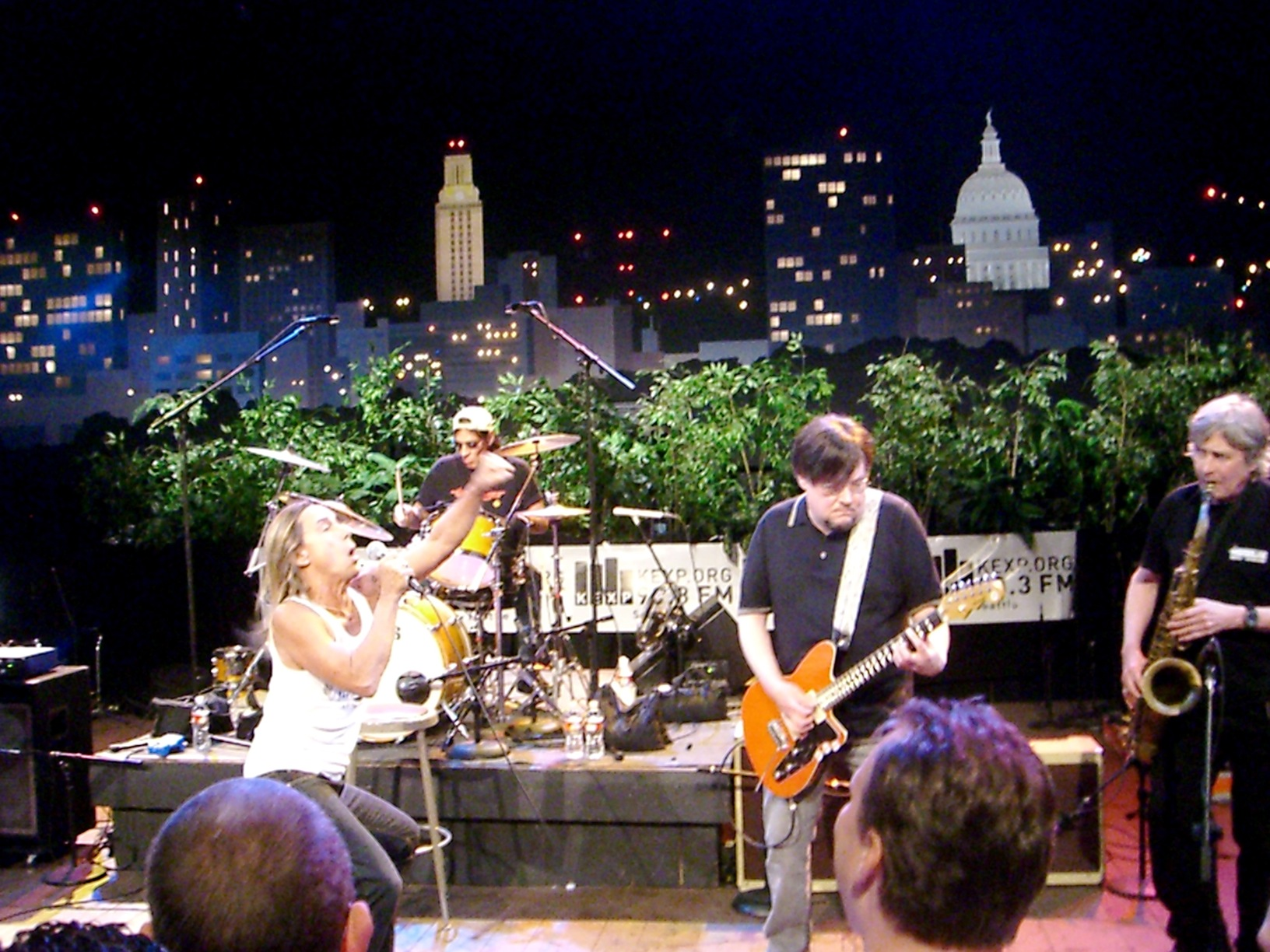
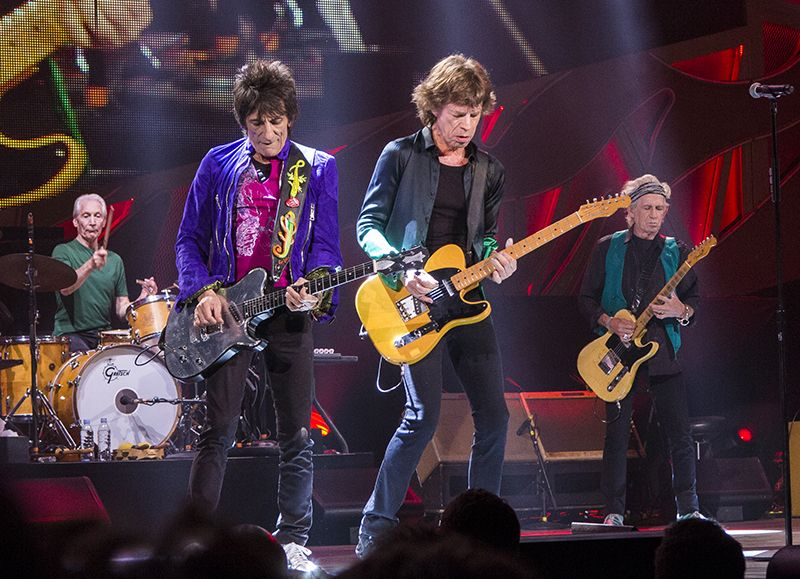
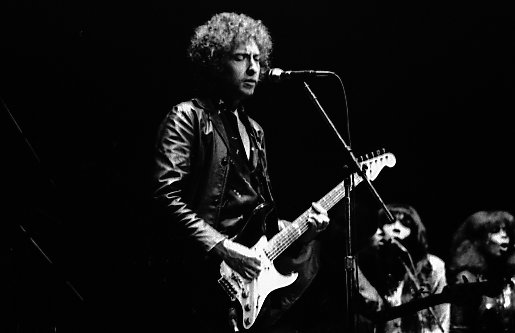
The band's final album, 2000's Renegades, features cover versions of songs originally recorded by (from top to bottom) Eric B. & Rakim, MC5, Afrika Bambaataa, Devo, EPMD, Minor Threat, Cypress Hill, The Stooges, The Rolling Stones and Bob Dylan, as well as Volume 10 (not pictured).

Key
†	Indicates song released as a single
‡	Indicates song written by the whole band

Title	Writer(s)	Release	Year	Ref.	Notes
"Ashes in the Fall"	Zack de la Rocha; Tom Morello; Tim Commerford; Brad Wilk ‡	The Battle of Los Angeles	1999		
"Auto Logic"	Zack de la Rocha; Tom Morello; Tim Commerford; Brad Wilk ‡	Rage Against the Machine (demo)	1991		
"Beautiful World"	Mark Mothersbaugh; Gerald Casale	Renegades	2000		(Note: "Beautiful World" was originally recorded by Devo.)
"Bombtrack" †	Zack de la Rocha; Tom Morello; Tim Commerford; Brad Wilk ‡	Rage Against the Machine	1992		(Note: "Bombtrack", "Bullet in the Head", "Clear the Lane", "Darkness of Greed", "Freedom", "Killing in the Name", "Know Your Enemy", "Take the Power Back" and "Township Rebellion" were originally released on the Rage Against the Machine demo in 1991.)
"Born as Ghosts"	Zack de la Rocha; Tom Morello; Tim Commerford; Brad Wilk ‡	The Battle of Los Angeles	1999		
"Born of a Broken Man"	Zack de la Rocha; Tom Morello; Tim Commerford; Brad Wilk ‡	The Battle of Los Angeles	1999		(Note: "Born of a Broken Man" is also known as "Broken Man".)
"Bullet in the Head" †	Zack de la Rocha; Tom Morello; Tim Commerford; Brad Wilk ‡	Rage Against the Machine	1992		
"Bulls on Parade" †	Zack de la Rocha; Tom Morello; Tim Commerford; Brad Wilk ‡	Evil Empire	1996		
"Calm Like a Bomb" †	Zack de la Rocha; Tom Morello; Tim Commerford; Brad Wilk ‡	The Battle of Los Angeles	1999		
"Clear the Lane"	Zack de la Rocha; Tom Morello; Tim Commerford; Brad Wilk ‡	"Killing in the Name"	1992		
"Darkness of Greed"	Zack de la Rocha; Tom Morello; Tim Commerford; Brad Wilk ‡	"Killing in the Name"	1992		(Note: A re-recorded version, titled merely "Darkness" was later released on The Crow: Original Motion Picture Soundtrack.)
"Down on the Street"	Iggy Pop; Ron Asheton; Scott Asheton; Dave Alexander	Renegades	2000		(Note: "Down on the Street" was originally recorded by The Stooges.)
"Down Rodeo" †	Zack de la Rocha; Tom Morello; Tim Commerford; Brad Wilk ‡	Evil Empire	1996		
"Fistful of Steel"	Zack de la Rocha; Tom Morello; Tim Commerford; Brad Wilk ‡	Rage Against the Machine	1992		
"Freedom" †	Zack de la Rocha; Tom Morello; Tim Commerford; Brad Wilk ‡	Rage Against the Machine	1992		
"Guerrilla Radio" †	Zack de la Rocha; Tom Morello; Tim Commerford; Brad Wilk ‡	The Battle of Los Angeles	1999		
"How I Could Just Kill a Man" †	Louis Freese; Senen Reyes; Lawrence Muggerud; Lowell Fulson; Jimmy McCracklin	Renegades	2000		(Note: "How I Could Just Kill a Man" was originally recorded by Cypress Hill.)
"I'm Housin"	Erick Sermon; Parrish Smith	Renegades	2000		(Note: "I'm Housin" was originally recorded by EPMD.)
"In My Eyes"	Ian MacKaye; Lyle Preslar; Brian Baker; Jeff Nelson	Renegades	2000		(Note: "In My Eyes" was originally recorded by Minor Threat.)
"Kick Out the Jams"	Rob Tyner; Wayne Kramer; Fred Smith; Michael Davis; Dennis Thompson	Renegades	2000		(Note: "Kick Out the Jams" was originally recorded by MC5.)
"Killing in the Name" †	Zack de la Rocha; Tom Morello; Tim Commerford; Brad Wilk ‡	Rage Against the Machine	1992		
"Know Your Enemy"	Zack de la Rocha; Tom Morello; Tim Commerford; Brad Wilk ‡	Rage Against the Machine	1992		(Note: "Know Your Enemy" features additional vocals by Maynard James Keenan.)
"Maggie's Farm"	Bob Dylan	Renegades	2000		(Note: "Maggie's Farm" was originally recorded by Bob Dylan.)
"Maria"	Zack de la Rocha; Tom Morello; Tim Commerford; Brad Wilk ‡	The Battle of Los Angeles	1999		
"Mic Check"	Zack de la Rocha; Tom Morello; Tim Commerford; Brad Wilk ‡	The Battle of Los Angeles	1999		
"Microphone Fiend"	Eric Barrier; William Griffin; Alan Gorrie; Hamish Stuart; Onnie McIntyre; Roger Ball; Malcolm Duncan; Steve Ferrone	Renegades	2000		(Note: "Microphone Fiend" was originally recorded by Eric B. & Rakim.)
"Mindset's a Threat"	Zack de la Rocha; Tom Morello; Tim Commerford; Brad Wilk ‡	Rage Against the Machine (demo)	1991		
"New Millennium Homes"	Zack de la Rocha; Tom Morello; Tim Commerford; Brad Wilk ‡	The Battle of Los Angeles	1999		
"No Shelter" †	Zack de la Rocha; Tom Morello; Tim Commerford; Brad Wilk ‡	Godzilla: The Album	1998		
"People of the Sun" †	Zack de la Rocha; Tom Morello; Tim Commerford; Brad Wilk ‡	Evil Empire	1996		
"Pistolgrip Pump"	Dino Hawkins; Roger Troutman; Nick Vidal; Eric Vidal	Renegades	2000		(Note: "Pistolgrip Pump" was originally recorded by Volume 10.)
"Renegades of Funk" †	Afrika Bambaataa; Arthur Baker; John Miller; John Robie; Robert Allen; Ellis Williams	Renegades	2000		(Note: "Renegades of Funk" was originally recorded by Afrika Bambaataa.)
"Revolver"	Zack de la Rocha; Tom Morello; Tim Commerford; Brad Wilk ‡	Evil Empire	1996		
"Roll Right"	Zack de la Rocha; Tom Morello; Tim Commerford; Brad Wilk ‡	Evil Empire	1996		
"Settle for Nothing"	Zack de la Rocha; Tom Morello; Tim Commerford; Brad Wilk ‡	Rage Against the Machine	1992		
"Sleep Now in the Fire" †	Zack de la Rocha; Tom Morello; Tim Commerford; Brad Wilk ‡	The Battle of Los Angeles	1999		
"Snakecharmer"	Zack de la Rocha; Tom Morello; Tim Commerford; Brad Wilk ‡	Evil Empire	1996		
"Street Fighting Man"	Mick Jagger; Keith Richards	Renegades	2000		(Note: "Street Fighting Man" was originally recorded by The Rolling Stones.)
"Take the Power Back"	Zack de la Rocha; Tom Morello; Tim Commerford; Brad Wilk ‡	Rage Against the Machine	1992		
"Testify" †	Zack de la Rocha; Tom Morello; Tim Commerford; Brad Wilk ‡	The Battle of Los Angeles	1999		
"The Ghost of Tom Joad" †	Bruce Springsteen	"The Ghost of Tom Joad"	1997		(Note: "The Ghost of Tom Joad", originally recorded by Bruce Springsteen, was also later released on Renegades in 2000.)
"The Narrows"	Zack de la Rocha; Tom Morello; Tim Commerford; Brad Wilk ‡	Rage Against the Machine (demo)	1991		
"Tire Me"	Zack de la Rocha; Tom Morello; Tim Commerford; Brad Wilk ‡	Evil Empire	1996		
"Township Rebellion"	Zack de la Rocha; Tom Morello; Tim Commerford; Brad Wilk ‡	Rage Against the Machine	1992		
"Vietnow" †	Zack de la Rocha; Tom Morello; Tim Commerford; Brad Wilk ‡	Evil Empire	1996		
"Voice of the Voiceless"	Zack de la Rocha; Tom Morello; Tim Commerford; Brad Wilk ‡	The Battle of Los Angeles	1999		
"Wake Up"	Zack de la Rocha; Tom Morello; Tim Commerford; Brad Wilk ‡	Rage Against the Machine	1992		
"War Within a Breath"	Zack de la Rocha; Tom Morello; Tim Commerford; Brad Wilk ‡	The Battle of Los Angeles	1999		
"Wind Below"	Zack de la Rocha; Tom Morello; Tim Commerford; Brad Wilk ‡	Evil Empire	1996		
"Without a Face"	Zack de la Rocha; Tom Morello; Tim Commerford; Brad Wilk ‡	Evil Empire	1996		
"Year of tha Boomerang" †	Zack de la Rocha; Tom Morello; Tim Commerford; Brad Wilk ‡	Higher Learning	1995		(Note: "Year of tha Boomerang" was also later released on Evil Empire in 1996.)

== See also ==
- Rage Against the Machine discography
