= Rage Against the Machine (disambiguation) =

Rage Against the Machine is an American rock band.

Rage Against the Machine may also refer to the following works by the band:

- Rage Against the Machine (album), their self-titled debut album
- Rage Against the Machine (demo album) (also known as American Composite), their original demo tape
- Rage Against the Machine (video), a music video featuring live performances and video clips
