= Rage Against the Machine (demo album) =

Demo album by Rage Against the Machine
- Released: December 1991
- Recorded: August–September 1991
- Studio: Sunbirth (North Hollywood, California)
- Genres: Rap metal; funk metal
- Length: 57:51
- Label: N/A (self-released)
- Producer: Rage Against the Machine

Rage Against the Machine chronology
Rage Against the Machine (1991)	Rage Against the Machine (1992)

Rage Against the Machine (also known as American Composite) is the original demo tape by American rock band Rage Against the Machine, released in December 1991. The 12-track tape was recorded at Sunburst Studios in North Hollywood after drummer Brad Wilk joined the band but before they had played their first live show. When the band began performing live shows they sold the tape for $5, eventually selling approximately 5,000 copies. Shortly thereafter, the band was signed to a record deal with Epic Records on the strength of the demo's success.

As well as being sold at early live shows, the demo tape was sent to a number of record companies to showcase the band. Atlantic Records was sent one and produced a number of copies. The Atlantic Records cassette tape features a different cover than the band's self-released tape, with an artistic rendering of a man with a distorted and zippered face.

== Tracks ==
Seven of the 12 songs on the demo tape became part of the band's eponymous debut album. Of the five songs omitted—"Darkness of Greed", "Clear the Lane", "Mindset's a Threat", "Auto Logic", and "The Narrows"—the first 2 were eventually included as B-sides on the lead single from the debut album, "Killing in the Name", with all of the songs later being released on the album, "Rage Against the Machine - XX (20th Anniversary Edition Deluxe Box Set)". Several songs on the demo are nearly identical to the versions appearing on the debut album, but others have noticeable differences; the tempo of "Take the Power Back" on the demo, for example, is much slower and has a different final verse. The record is notable for the first appearance of the song "Bullet in the Head", which became a hit when reissued as a single later in the year after being transferred intact (with re-recorded vocals for the verses only) from the demo to the album.

The song "Darkness of Greed" hails back to vocalist de la Rocha's previous band Inside Out, which broke up mid-1991. It is called "Genocide" on some bootleg RATM Demo albums. Inside Out performed the song on many occasions, and several RoIOs exist of those performances. (RATM later re-recorded the song as simply "Darkness" for The Crow soundtrack.) Another significant indicator of Inside Out's influence on RATM's initial direction is the fact the name "Rage Against the Machine" is also the title of an Inside Out song.

The main riff from "The Narrows" would later be reused as the main riff for "Fistful of Steel" and parts of "Mindset's a Threat" would later become a part of "Wake Up" and are present in "Freedom" and in the solo on "Bullet in the Head". The main riff for "Clear the Lane" is nearly identical to that used on their 2000 cover of The Rolling Stones' "Street Fighting Man".

The songs "Darkness of Greed" and "Clear the Lane" were both digitally remastered and included as B-sides on the "Killing in the Name" single and have both been reissued on singles and promos many times since.

The artwork features images from a newspaper's stock market section with a single match taped to the inlay card. The statement, "No samples, keyboards or synthesizers used in the making of this recording", can be found on the cover, and the band also refer to themselves as "Guilty Parties" as they did on each subsequent original studio album.

== Early songs omitted from the demo ==
Songs titled "Hit the Deck" and "Clampdown" (the latter of which is a cover of The Clash), were performed live at the band's second show at California State University Northridge on October 23, 1991, but neither song was added to the demo; no studio version of either song is known to exist.

== Track listing ==
The songs on the demo are as follows:

1. "Bombtrack" – 4:14
2. "Take the Power Back" – 5:52
3. "Bullet in the Head" – 5:17
4. "Darkness of Greed" – 3:45
5. "Clear the Lane" – 3:54
6. "Township Rebellion" – 4:28
7. "Know Your Enemy" – 4:22
8. "Mindset's a Threat" – 4:03
9. "Killing in the Name" – 6:38
10. "Auto Logic" – 4:07
11. "The Narrows" – 4:39
12. "Freedom" – 5:44

== Personnel ==
- Zack de la Rocha – vocals
- Tom Morello – guitar
- Tim Commerford – bass (listed as Timmy C.)
- Brad Wilk – drums
- Rage Against the Machine – production
- Auburn Burell – recording engineer

== 7-inch EP ==
Sometime after their debut CD was released, an unofficial white label 33 RPM 7-inch vinyl was produced, simply titled Rage Against the Machine; it featured 3 tracks from the demo tape.

Both catalog numbers are etched into both sides; RELAPSE-3 L-41056 appears as RELAPSE-3 L-41056-X on the B-side. A paper sleeve shows a xeroxed image of the band name and a portion of the debut CD's front cover; backside has track titles and newspaper clip images, reminiscent of the demo tape artwork. Some copies have the band's name in all capital letters ink-stamped on the white label.

This is apparently a Japanese-issued fan club pressing.

The versions of the B-sides are, in fact, the original rough demo productions and not the remastered versions previously appearing on the "Killing in the Name" single.

=== Track listing ===
1. A "Mindset's a Threat" – 3:59
2. B1 "Darkness of Greed" – 3:42
3. B2 "Clear the Lane" – 3:50
