= Clear Channel memorandum =

List of songs discouraged from being played after September 11 attacks

Following the September 11 attacks in 2001, Clear Channel Communications (now iHeartMedia), the largest owner of radio stations in the United States, circulated an internal memorandum containing a list of songs that program directors felt were "lyrically questionable" to play in the aftermath of the attacks.

During the time immediately after the attacks, many television and radio stations altered normal programming in response to the events, and the rumor spread that Clear Channel and its subsidiaries had established a list of songs with lyrics Clear Channel deemed "questionable." The list was not an explicit demand not to play the songs listed, but rather a suggestion that they "might not want to play these songs." The list was made public by the independent radio industry newsletter Hits Daily Double, which was not affiliated with iHeartMedia. Snopes.com did research on the subject and concluded that the list did exist as a suggestion for radio stations, but noted that it was not an outright ban on the songs in question. The compiled list was the subject of media attention around the time of its release.

The list names 162 songs as well as "All Rage Against The Machine songs". Rage Against the Machine is the only instance on the list of an artist's entire catalog being recommended against. A few of the songs name multiple bands' versions (such as Bob Dylan's "Knockin' on Heaven's Door" and the cover by Guns N' Roses). In some cases, only certain covers were included on the list: for example, the cover of "Smooth Criminal" by Alien Ant Farm is on the list while the original Michael Jackson recording is not; conversely, Martha and the Vandellas' original version of "Dancing in the Street" and Van Halen's cover are included, but David Bowie and Mick Jagger's cover is not.

== Reasons for inclusions ==
The Clear Channel memorandum contains songs that, in their titles or lyrics, address topics that relate to the September 11 attacks, such as airplanes, collisions, death, violence, explosions, the month of September, Tuesday (the day of the week the attacks occurred) and New York City, as well as general concepts that could be connected to aspects of the attacks, such as conflict, the Middle East, the sky falling, and weapons. Also included under the ban were several happy and celebratory songs (including Louis Armstrong's "What a Wonderful World"), as Clear Channel believed playing joyful music in the aftermath of the attacks was inappropriate.

WASH, a Clear Channel-owned station in Washington, D.C., reportedly played Kool & the Gang's "Celebration" while the memorandum was being circulated, "which brought a polite if reproachful call from one listener, who was assured by the station the song's broadcast was a mistake."

== List of songs ==
| Artist | Song title | Year |
|---|---|---|
| 3 Doors Down | "Duck and Run" | 2001 |
| 311 | "Down" | 1996 |
| AC/DC | "Dirty Deeds Done Dirt Cheap" | 1976 |
| AC/DC | "Hells Bells" | 1980 |
| AC/DC | "Highway to Hell" | 1979 |
| AC/DC | "Safe in New York City" | 2000 |
| AC/DC | "Shoot to Thrill" | 1980 |
| AC/DC | "Shot Down in Flames" | 1980 |
| AC/DC | "T.N.T." | 1976 |
| The Ad Libs | "The Boy from New York City" | 1964 |
| Afro Celt Sound System featuring Peter Gabriel (Note: "When You're Falling" is listed as being by Peter Gabriel, but is actually by Afro Celt Sound System, with Gabriel as guest vocalist.) | "When You're Falling" | 2001 |
| Alice in Chains | "Down in a Hole" | 1992 |
| Alice in Chains | "Rooster" | 1992 |
| Alice in Chains | "Sea of Sorrow" | 1990 |
| Alice in Chains | "Them Bones" | 1992 |
| Alien Ant Farm | "Smooth Criminal" | 2001 |
| The Animals | "We Gotta Get Out of This Place" | 1965 |
| Louis Armstrong | "What a Wonderful World" | 1967 |
| The Bangles | "Walk Like an Egyptian" (Note: The lead 9/11 hijacker, Mohamed Atta, was Egyptian.) | 1986 |
| Barenaked Ladies | "Falling for the First Time" | 2000 |
| Fontella Bass | "Rescue Me" | 1965 |
| Beastie Boys | "Sabotage" | 1994 |
| Beastie Boys | "Sure Shot" | 1994 |
| The Beatles | "A Day in the Life" | 1967 |
| The Beatles | "Lucy in the Sky with Diamonds" | 1967 |
| The Beatles | "Ob-La-Di, Ob-La-Da" | 1968 |
| The Beatles | "Ticket to Ride" | 1965 |
| Pat Benatar | "Hit Me with Your Best Shot" | 1980 |
| Pat Benatar | "Love Is a Battlefield" | 1983 |
| Black Sabbath | "Sabbath Bloody Sabbath" | 1973 |
| Black Sabbath | "War Pigs" | 1970 |
| Blood, Sweat & Tears | "And When I Die" | 1969 |
| Blue Öyster Cult | "Burnin' for You" | 1981 |
| Boston | "Smokin'" | 1976 |
| Los Bravos | "Black Is Black" | 1966 |
| Jackson Browne | "Doctor My Eyes" | 1972 |
| Bush | "Speed Kills" (Note: The original name of the song was "Speed Kills", but following the attacks on September 11, 2001, Bush renamed the song "The People That We Love".) | 2001 |
| The Chi-Lites | "Have You Seen Her" | 1971 |
| Petula Clark | "A Sign of the Times" | 1966 |
| The Clash | "Rock the Casbah" | 1982 |
| Phil Collins | "In the Air Tonight" | 1981 |
| Sam Cooke | "Wonderful World" | 1960 |
| The Crazy World of Arthur Brown | "Fire" | 1968 |
| Creedence Clearwater Revival | "Travelin' Band" | 1970 |
| The Crickets | "That'll Be the Day" | 1957 |
| The Cult | "Fire Woman" | 1989 |
| Bobby Darin | "Mack the Knife" | 1959 |
| The Dave Clark Five | "Bits and Pieces" | 1964 |
| Skeeter Davis | "The End of the World" | 1962 |
| Neil Diamond | "America" | 1980 |
| Dio | "Holy Diver" | 1983 |
| The Doors | "The End" | 1967 |
| The Drifters | "On Broadway" | 1963 |
| Drowning Pool | "Bodies" | 2001 |
| Bob Dylan | "Knockin' on Heaven's Door" | 1973 |
| Everclear | "Santa Monica" | 1995 |
| Shelley Fabares | "Johnny Angel" | 1962 |
| Filter | "Hey Man Nice Shot" | 1995 |
| Foo Fighters | "Learn to Fly" | 1999 |
| Fuel | "Bad Day" | 2000 |
| The Gap Band | "You Dropped a Bomb on Me" | 1982 |
| Godsmack | "Bad Religion" | 1998 |
| Green Day | "Brain Stew" | 1995 |
| Norman Greenbaum | "Spirit in the Sky" | 1970 |
| Guns N' Roses | "Knockin' on Heaven's Door" | 1990 |
| The Happenings | "See You in September" | 1966 |
| The Jimi Hendrix Experience | "Hey Joe" | 1966 |
| Herman's Hermits | "Wonderful World" | 1965 |
| The Hollies | "He Ain't Heavy, He's My Brother" | 1969 |
| Jan and Dean | "Dead Man's Curve" | 1963 |
| Billy Joel | "Only the Good Die Young" | 1977 |
| Elton John | "Bennie and the Jets" | 1973 |
| Elton John | "Daniel" | 1973 |
| Elton John | "Rocket Man" | 1972 |
| Judas Priest | "Some Heads Are Gonna Roll" | 1984 |
| Kansas | "Dust in the Wind" | 1977 |
| Carole King | "I Feel the Earth Move" | 1971 |
| Korn | "Falling Away from Me" | 1999 |
| Lenny Kravitz | "Fly Away" | 1998 |
| Led Zeppelin | "Stairway to Heaven" | 1971 |
| John Lennon | "Imagine" | 1971 |
| Jerry Lee Lewis | "Great Balls of Fire" | 1957 |
| Limp Bizkit | "Break Stuff" | 1999 |
| Local H | "Bound for the Floor" | 1996 |
| Lynyrd Skynyrd | "Tuesday's Gone" | 1973 |
| Johnny Maestro & The Brooklyn Bridge | "Worst That Could Happen" | 1968 |
| Martha and the Vandellas | "Dancing in the Street" | 1964 |
| Martha and the Vandellas | "Nowhere to Run" | 1965 |
| Dave Matthews Band | "Crash into Me" | 1996 |
| Paul McCartney and Wings | "Live and Let Die" | 1972 |
| Barry McGuire | "Eve of Destruction" | 1965 |
| Don McLean | "American Pie" | 1971 |
| Megadeth | "Dread and the Fugitive Mind" | 2001 |
| Megadeth | "Sweating Bullets" | 1992 |
| John Mellencamp | "Crumblin' Down" | 1983 |
| John Mellencamp | "Paper in Fire" | 1987 |
| Metallica | "Enter Sandman" | 1991 |
| Metallica | "Fade to Black" | 1984 |
| Metallica | "Harvester of Sorrow" | 1988 |
| Metallica | "Seek & Destroy" | 1983 |
| Steve Miller Band | "Jet Airliner" | 1977 |
| Alanis Morissette | "Ironic" | 1995 |
| Mudvayne | "Death Blooms" | 2000 |
| Ricky Nelson | "Travelin' Man" | 1961 |
| Nena | "99 Luftballons"/"99 Red Balloons" | 1983 |
| Nine Inch Nails | "Head Like a Hole" | 1989 |
| Oingo Boingo | "Dead Man's Party" | 1985 |
| Ozzy Osbourne (Note: "Suicide Solution" is listed as being by Black Sabbath, but is actually by Ozzy Osbourne, a lead singer of Black Sabbath.) | "Suicide Solution" | 1980 |
| Paper Lace | "The Night Chicago Died" | 1974 |
| John Parr | "St. Elmo's Fire (Man in Motion)" | 1985 |
| Peter and Gordon | "I Go to Pieces" | 1964 |
| Peter and Gordon | "A World Without Love" | 1964 |
| Peter, Paul and Mary | "Blowin' in the Wind" | 1963 |
| Peter, Paul and Mary | "Leaving on a Jet Plane" | 1969 |
| Pennywise | "Fuck Authority" | 2001 |
| Tom Petty | "Free Fallin'" | 1989 |
| Pink Floyd | "Mother" | 1979 |
| Pink Floyd | "Run Like Hell" | 1979 |
| P.O.D. | "Boom" | 2001 |
| Elvis Presley | "(You're the) Devil in Disguise" | 1963 |
| The Pretenders | "My City Was Gone" | 1982 |
| Queen | "Another One Bites the Dust" | 1980 |
| Queen | "Killer Queen" | 1974 |
| Rage Against the Machine | All songs | 1992-2000 |
| Red Hot Chili Peppers | "Aeroplane" | 1995 |
| Red Hot Chili Peppers | "Under the Bridge" | 1991 |
| R.E.M. | "It's the End of the World as We Know It (And I Feel Fine)" | 1987 |
| The Rolling Stones | "Ruby Tuesday" | 1967 |
| Mitch Ryder and the Detroit Wheels | "Devil with a Blue Dress On" | 1964 |
| Saliva | "Click Click Boom" | 2001 |
| Santana | "Evil Ways" | 1969 |
| Savage Garden | "Crash and Burn" | 1999 |
| Simon & Garfunkel | "Bridge over Troubled Water" | 1970 |
| Frank Sinatra | "New York, New York" | 1980 |
| Slipknot | "Left Behind" | 2001 |
| Slipknot | "Wait and Bleed" | 1999 |
| The Smashing Pumpkins | "Bullet with Butterfly Wings" | 1995 |
| Soundgarden | "Black Hole Sun" | 1994 |
| Soundgarden | "Blow Up the Outside World" | 1996 |
| Soundgarden | "Fell on Black Days" | 1994 |
| Bruce Springsteen | "I'm Goin' Down" | 1984 |
| Bruce Springsteen | "I'm on Fire" | 1984 |
| Bruce Springsteen | "War" | 1986 |
| Edwin Starr | "War" | 1970 |
| Steam | "Na Na Hey Hey Kiss Him Goodbye" | 1969 |
| Cat Stevens | "Morning Has Broken" | 1972 |
| Cat Stevens | "Peace Train" | 1971 |
| Stone Temple Pilots | "Big Bang Baby" | 1996 |
| Stone Temple Pilots | "Dead & Bloated" | 1992 |
| Sugar Ray | "Fly" | 1997 |
| The Surfaris | "Wipe Out" | 1963 |
| System of a Down | "Chop Suey!" | 2001 |
| Talking Heads | "Burning Down the House" | 1983 |
| James Taylor | "Fire and Rain" | 1970 |
| Temple of the Dog | "Say Hello 2 Heaven" | 1991 |
| Third Eye Blind | "Jumper" | 1997 |
| The Three Degrees | "When Will I See You Again" | 1973 |
| Tool | "Intolerance" | 1993 |
| The Trammps | "Disco Inferno" | 1976 |
| U2 | "Sunday Bloody Sunday" | 1983 |
| Van Halen | "Jump" | 1983 |
| Van Halen | "Dancing in the Street" | 1982 |
| J. Frank Wilson and the Cavaliers | "Last Kiss" | 1964 |
| The Youngbloods | "Get Together" | 1967 |
| Zager and Evans | "In the Year 2525" | 1969 |
| The Zombies | "She's Not There" | 1965 |

== See also ==
- List of songs about the September 11 attacks
- List of songs banned by the BBC
- Music censorship
