= Brass Against =

Musical collective

- Members: Brad Hammonds; Andrew Gutauskas; Sophia Urista; Liza Colby; Michael Cunio; Frank Cohen; Joseph Exley; Nathan Ellman-Bell; Oskar Stenmark; Wayne Tucker; Mazz Swift; Mariel Bildsten
- Website: brassagainst.com

Brass Against is an American cover band that creates brass-inflected cover versions of rock songs. The collective chooses politically charged songs and other socially conscious music in order to raise awareness of various issues and to encourage activism and social change.

Brass Against was founded by guitarist Brad Hammonds. Hammonds was galvanized by the rise of Donald Trump. Hammonds later said he felt "we needed Rage Against the Machine more than ever" in the run-up to the 2016 United States presidential election "and wanted to do something besides simply expressing views on social media."

Hammonds and saxophonist Andy Gutauskas gathered some friends who recorded their first video, a cover of "Bombtrack" released in September 2017.

In 2021, lead singer Sophia Urista urinated on a fan onstage during a Welcome to Rockville performance at Daytona International Speedway in Daytona Beach, Florida. Brass Against apologized, tweeting that Urista had gotten "carried away". They added: "That's not something the rest of us expected, and it's not something you'll see again at our shows." The band was banned from performing at the festival and future NASCAR events.

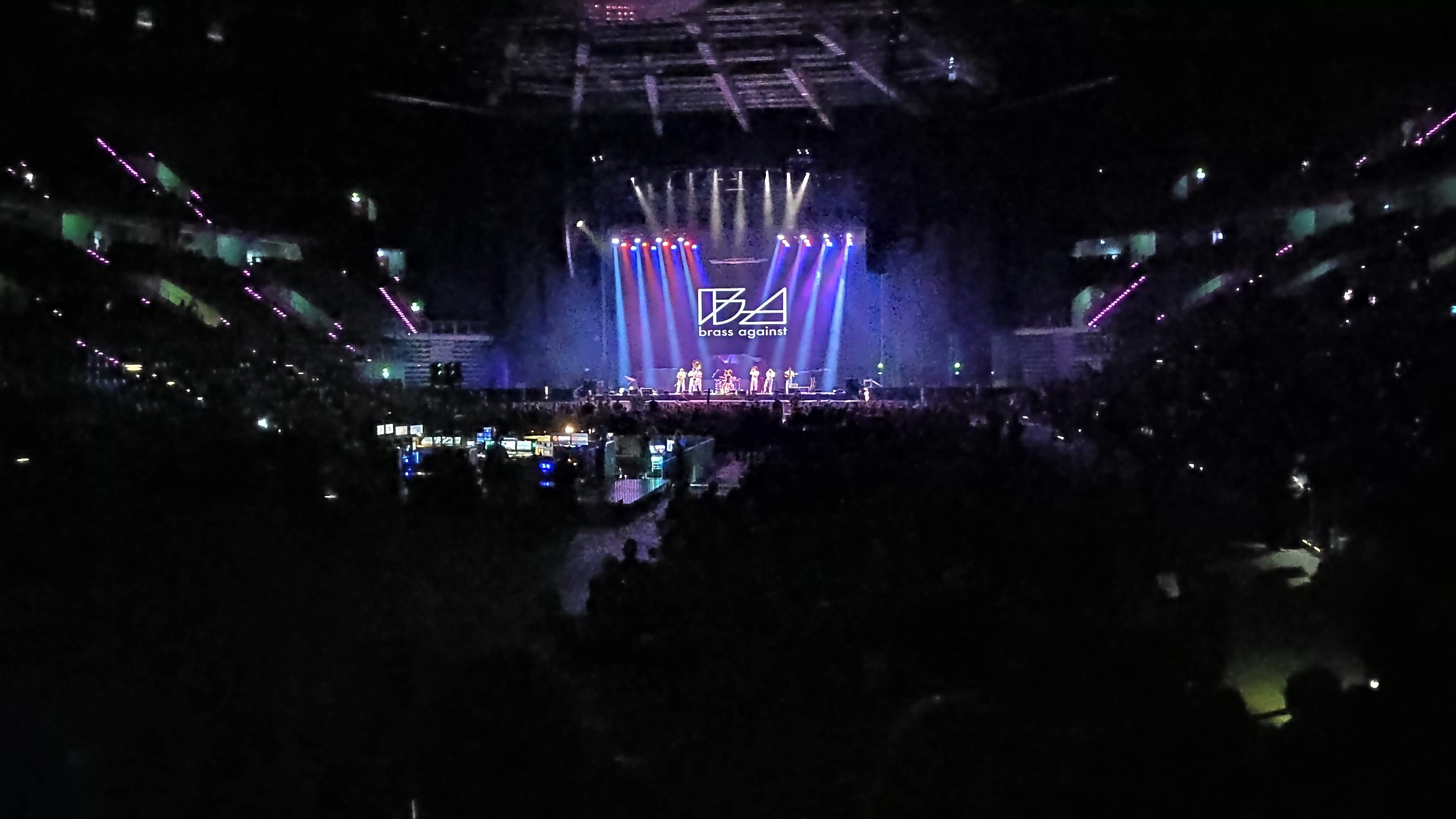
Brass Against performing as a Tool support in Tauron Arena Cracow

Their cover of Rage Against the Machine's song "Wake Up" was featured in the end credits of the 2021 film The Matrix Resurrections.
