= Bullet in the Head (song) =

Single by Rage Against the Machine

from the album Rage Against the Machine
- Released: April 26, 1993
- Studio: Sound City (Van Nuys, California)
- Genre: Rap metal; funk metal
- Length: 5:08
- Label: Epic
- Songwriters: Tim Commerford; Zack de la Rocha; Tom Morello; Brad Wilk
- Producers: Garth Richardson; Rage Against the Machine

Rage Against the Machine singles chronology
"Killing in the Name" (1992)	"Bullet in the Head" (1993)	"Bombtrack" (1993)

Music video
- "Bullet in the Head" on YouTube

"Bullet in the Head"
"Bullet in the Head" audio sample

Bullet in the Head is a song by American rock band Rage Against the Machine, released as the second single from their 1992 eponymous debut album. A fan favorite and one of the album's heaviest tracks, "Bullet in the Head" refers to the band's belief that the government uses media to control the population, drawing comparisons between typical residences and Alcatraz. The track was transferred intact from the band's demo, also titled Rage Against the Machine.

Both front and back images for the single's artwork were by the French photographer Marc Riboud.

== In popular culture ==
This song was to be the second performance on Rage Against the Machine's set during an April 1996 episode of Saturday Night Live. However, the band was kicked out after only one song for hanging inverted American flags from their amplifiers.

== Music video ==
A video clip was recorded in a warehouse in New York. While not often cited, this isn't a mimed video, but a live performance recorded for the BBC's program The Late Show. In the words of Tom Morello, "The tour bus pulled up in front of the BBC studio, we ran through the song once in front of the cameras, then left to play a club that night." The video appeared on the band's self-titled DVD, released November 25, 1997 on Epic Records.

== Track listing ==
No.	Title	Length
1.	"Bullet in the Head" (album version)	5:08
2.	"Bullet in the Head" (remix)	5:39
3.	"Bullet in the Head" (live)	5:46
4.	"Settle for Nothing" (live)	4:58
Total length:		21:34

- Remix done by Sir J Jinx.

== Charts ==
Chart (1993)	Peak position
Australia (ARIA)	53
Netherlands (Single Top 100)	47
New Zealand (Recorded Music NZ)	19
UK Singles (OCC)	16
