= Know Your Enemy (Rage Against the Machine song) =

Song by Rage Against the Machine featuring Maynard James Keenan

from the album Rage Against the Machine
- Released: November 3, 1992
- Genre: Rap metal; alternative metal; rap rock
- Length: 4:55
- Label: Epic
- Composers: Tim Commerford, Zack de la Rocha, Tom Morello, Brad Wilk
- Lyricist: Zack de la Rocha
- Producers: Garth 'GGGarth' Richardson, Rage Against the Machine

Audio sample
- "Know Your Enemy": file; help

"Know Your Enemy" is a song by American rock band Rage Against the Machine. It features Tool vocalist Maynard James Keenan on vocals during the bridge section, and Jane's Addiction drummer Stephen Perkins playing additional percussion. Allmusic describes the song as "immediately memorable" and "surprisingly straightforward" while music critic Joel McIver cited it as "a standout track" of the album. "Know Your Enemy" had received significant radio airplay by 1993, despite never being released as an official single.

== Background ==
The song's main riffs were written by Tim Commerford on an acoustic bass. The bridge features Maynard James Keenan's vocals; Perry Farrell was asked to sing the part but his absence led to it being given to former Rage lead vocalist candidate Keenan instead.

The album version is not the same as the demo version. The original is over 30 seconds shorter with no singing, uses distortion under the guitar solo without any 32nd notes or whammy pedal, and is notable for the misspelling of "defiance" as D-E-F-I-E-N-C-E. There is also an alternate drum breakdown and the outro section is not present with the song ending on an additional rant.

== Composition ==
The song is in common time and in the key of F♯ minor. The intro, in a moderate tempo of 84 BPM, makes use of Tom Morello's toggle switch, switching his pickups on and off to create a tremolo effect. Morello's effect is to imitate 70s classic rock synthesizer sounds. This is accompanied by Tim Commerford's slap bass, making this the only other track on the album to use the technique besides "Take the Power Back." After this, it starts up in a faster, punk-ish riff at a tempo of 114. This then leads into the verse, another fast-paced riff centered upon the bass. The chorus then returns to the original riff again, and then returns to the verse. Then, the song goes into a slower beat with palm-muted guitar, additional percussion by Stephen Perkins, and the trance-like vocals of Maynard James Keenan ("I've got no patience now/so sick of complacence now/sick of you/time has come to pay"). This is followed by Tom Morello's guitar solo using the DigiTech Whammy pedal harmonizer setting (as opposed to the pitch shifter setting used during the solo of "Killing in the Name") and toggle switch until the tempo slows down dramatically with a false ending. It goes back to the verse riff with Zack speaking the line "All of which are American dreams" eight times, finishing well after the band stops playing.

== Political statements ==
The song, like many others in the album, contains anti-war and anti-authoritarian lyrics. The song's main message is that the American government is contradictory when it touts itself as the land of the free yet is run by an elitist enterprise, and that you should question authority figures who determine what you are able to believe. That message is evident in lines such as, "What? The land of the free? Whoever told you that is your enemy!", "As we move into '92, still in a room without a view!" and "Yes I know my enemies! They're the teachers that taught me to fight me!" The song ends with the following lines:

Compromise
Conformity
Assimilation
Submission
Ignorance
Hypocrisy
Brutality
The Elite
All of which are American dreams!
All of which are American dreams!
All of which are American dreams!
All of which are American dreams!
All of which are American dreams!
All of which are American dreams!
All of which are American dreams!
All of which are American dreams!
