= Wake Up (Rage Against the Machine song) =

Song by Rage Against the Machine

from the album Rage Against the Machine
- Released: November 3, 1992
- Genre: Hard rock
- Length: 6:04
- Label: Epic
- Songwriters: Tim Commerford, Zack de la Rocha, Tom Morello, Brad Wilk
- Producers: Garth 'GGGarth' Richardson, Rage Against the Machine

"Wake Up" is a song by American rock band Rage Against the Machine, appearing on their first album Rage Against the Machine. While never released as a single, it remains a staple of their live shows and is usually played as the last song before the encore; the spoken word portion of the song, using a real memo from J. Edgar Hoover, is often replaced with a speech addressing contemporary issues, given by frontman Zack de la Rocha. It appears in the 1999 film The Matrix during the final scene.

== Composition ==
The lyrics discuss racism within the American government and the counter-intelligence programs of the Federal Bureau of Investigation (FBI); a spoken portion of the song is taken from an actual FBI memo in which its director J. Edgar Hoover suggests targets for the suppression of the black nationalist movement. The song also makes references to prominent African-American figures targeted by the government such as Malcolm X and Martin Luther King Jr., and goes as far as saying that the government arranged their assassinations.

The closing lines to the song are:

How long, not long
because what you reap is what you sow!

These lyrics refer to a speech made by Martin Luther King Jr., which paraphrases part of a well-known Bible verse, "whatever a man sows, this he will also reap" (Galatians 6:7). The speech was delivered at the end of the Selma to Montgomery March on the steps of the State Capitol Building in Montgomery, Alabama. The final lines in that speech read "How Long? Not long, because 'you shall reap what you sow'."

"Wake Up" is one of many songs by Rage Against the Machine that is played in drop D tuning on the guitar and bass.

== Political speeches ==
In live performances, the band's frontman Zack de la Rocha often makes speeches about current issues in place of the segment where he reads the J. Edgar Hoover memo aloud. At the 2007 Coachella Festival, de la Rocha used this segment of the song to allege that the United States would start wars in other countries to suit its own purposes, citing a statement by Noam Chomsky regarding the Nuremberg Trials:

A good friend of ours said that if the same laws were applied to U.S. presidents as were applied to the Nazis after World War II […] every single one of them, every last rich white one of them from Truman on, would have been hung to death and shot—and this current administration is no exception. They should be hung, and tried, and shot. As any war criminal should be. But the challenges that we face, they go way beyond administrations, way beyond elections, way beyond every four years of pulling levers, way beyond that. Because this whole rotten system has become so vicious and cruel that in order to sustain itself, it needs to destroy entire countries and profit from their reconstruction in order to survive—and that's not a system that changes every four years, it's a system that we have to break down, generation after generation after generation after generation after generation…Wake up.

The event led to a media furor. A clip of his speech found its way to the Fox News Channel program Hannity & Colmes. An on-screen headline read, "Rock group 'Rage Against the Machine' says Bush admin should be shot." Ann Coulter (a guest on the show) quipped, "They're losers, their fans are losers, and there's a lot of violence coming from the left wing." Then Alan Colmes reminded Coulter when she said about former President Bill Clinton that "The only issue is whether to impeach or assassinate."

In response, during the band's performance at the Rock the Bells festival in New York City on July 28, de la Rocha doubled down on his remarks at Coachella, claiming the show had deliberately misrepresented his words:

A couple of months ago, those fascist motherfuckers at the Fox News Network attempted to pin this band into a corner by suggesting that we said that the president should be assassinated. Nah, what we said was that he should be brought to trial as a war criminal and hung and shot. THAT'S what we said. And we don't back away from the position because the real assassinator is Bush and Cheney and the whole administration for the lives they have destroyed here and in Iraq. They're the ones. And what they refused to air which was far more provocative in my mind and in the minds of my bandmates is this: this system has become so brutal and vicious and cruel that it needs to start wars and profit from the destruction around the world in order to survive as a world power. THAT's what we said. And we refuse not to stand up, we refuse to back down from that position not only for the poor kids who are being left out in the desert to die, but for the Iraqi youth, the Iraqi people, their families and their friends, and their youth who are standing up and resisting the U.S. occupation every day. And if we truly want to end this fucking miserable war, we have to stand up with the same force that the Iraqi youth are standing up with every day, and bring these motherfuckers to their knees. Wake up…

On other occasions, de la Rocha has used this segment of the song to denounce the United States' handling of Hurricane Katrina, condemn globalism, urge solidarity among the lower classes against the wealthy elite, and express support for protesters in response to the Great Recession.

== In other media ==
- The song was used in the end credits of the 1999 blockbuster hit The Matrix and was also featured on its soundtrack. It is one of many songs in the soundtrack which fades-out rather than stops.
  - An orchestral cover of the song by musician Sebastian Bohm was featured in the trailer for the fourth installment of the franchise, The Matrix Resurrections. Another cover, performed by Brass Against, is featured over the film's end credits, mirroring its use in the original film.
- The intro to the song played at the end of X2's soundtrack at Six Flags Magic Mountain in California. The ride got rid of the soundtrack in its entirety in 2025.
- The song was featured in the video game Dave Mirra Freestyle BMX 2.

== Certifications ==
Region	Certification	Certified units/sales
New Zealand (RMNZ)	Gold	15,000^{‡}
United Kingdom (BPI)	Silver	200,000^{‡}
^{‡} Sales+streaming figures based on certification alone.
