= Bombtrack =

Single by Rage Against the Machine

from the album Rage Against the Machine
- Released: June 7, 1993
- Recorded: 1992
- Studio: Sound City (Van Nuys, California)
- Genre: Rap metal; alternative metal
- Length: 4:02
- Label: Epic
- Songwriters: Tim Commerford; Zack de la Rocha; Tom Morello; Brad Wilk
- Producers: Garth "GGGarth" Richardson; Rage Against the Machine

Rage Against the Machine singles chronology
| "Bullet in the Head" (1993) | "Bombtrack" (1993) | "Freedom" (1994) |

Music video
- "Bombtrack" on YouTube

"Bombtrack" is a song by American rock band Rage Against the Machine. It is the band’s third single and the opening track on their self-titled debut album.

Like most of Rage Against the Machine's songs, the song's lyrics discuss social inequality, proclaiming that "landlords and power whores" were going to "burn".

The riffs were composed by Rage Against the Machine bassist Tim Commerford. The song is one of three on the album in the key of F♯ along with "Know Your Enemy" and "Fistful of Steel". It is their highest-charting song in the Netherlands, at number eight.

== Cover ==
The single artwork features Cuban photographer Alberto Korda's famous image of Che Guevara, Guerrillero Heroico. A mirrored version of the iconic two-tone portrait by Irish artist Jim Fitzpatrick (T-shirt version).

== Music video ==
A music video was released, depicting support for the Peruvian Maoist organization Sendero Luminoso and its leader Abimael Guzman.

In the video, the group played inside a cage, mimicking Guzman being shown to journalists inside a cage after his capture by the Peruvian military. The initial sequence of the video feature the sentence "For 13 years the people of Peru have waged revolutionary war against their oppressive U.S.-backed government. Their movement is known as the Sendero luminoso or Shining Path."

The group mentioned Shining Path again in the lyrics of "Without a Face."

The video clip did not appear on the group's first home video, citing Rage's first altered political opinion. In 2003, the video finally appeared as bonus material on their Live at the Grand Olympic Auditorium DVD.

== Track listing ==
CD

1. "Bombtrack"
2. "Bombtrack [Evening Session version]"
3. "Bombtrack [live version]"
- The 'Evening Session' version was recorded on BBC Radio 1 during Mark Goodier's Evening Session.

7"

1. "Bombtrack" – 4:03
2. "Bombtrack" (live) – 6:00

=== Special Pinkpop edition ===
On May 23, 1994, a special edition of the "Bombtrack" CD single was released in the Netherlands for the Pinkpop Music Festival's 25th birthday. This version contains an alternative track listing.

1. "Bombtrack"
2. "Freedom" (live)
3. "Settle for Nothing" (live)
4. "Bombtrack" [Evening Session version]
5. "Bullet in the Head" [remix]
6. "Take the Power Back" (live)
7. "Darkness of Greed"
8. "Bullet in the Head" (live)
9. "Bombtrack" (live)

Tracks three and eight recorded live at Melkweg in Amsterdam, February 7, 1993. Track six recorded live in Vancouver, British Columbia, Canada, April 11, 1993. Track nine recorded live in Minneapolis, United States, April 5, 1993. Track five remix by Sir Jinx.

The Evening Session version of "Bombtrack" is a completely reworked, slower "swing" version of the song with altered lyrics, which later appeared on Evil Empire's "Without a Face".

== In popular culture ==
In 2017, Stone Sour covered the song as part of Metal Hammer's Metal Hammer Goes '90s compilation album, and appears on the deluxe edition of their 2017 album Hydrograd.

Perhaps the song's most notable appearance outside of the music industry would be its appearance in Oliver Stone's controversial film Natural Born Killers, when Mickey breaks out of his prison cell in search of Mallory.

== Charts ==
=== Weekly charts ===
Weekly chart performance for "Bombtrack"
| Chart (1993–94) | Peak position |
|---|---|
| Netherlands (Dutch Top 40) | 13 |
| Netherlands (Single Top 100) | 8 |
| New Zealand (Recorded Music NZ) | 11 |
| UK Singles (Official Charts) | 37 |

=== Yearly charts ===
Year-end chart performance for "Bombtrack"
| Chart (1994) | Position |
|---|---|
| Netherlands (Single Top 100) | 33 |

== Certifications ==
| Region | Certification | Certified units/sales |
|---|---|---|
| United Kingdom (BPI) | Silver | 200,000^{‡} |
^{‡} Sales+streaming figures based on certification alone.

== Release history ==
Release dates and formats for "Bombtrack"
| Region | Date | Format(s) | Label(s) | Ref. |
|---|---|---|---|---|
| United States | June 7, 1993 | Radio | Epic | |
| United Kingdom | August 23, 1993 | 7-inch vinyl; 12-inch vinyl; CD | Epic | |
| Australia | October 25, 1993 | CD; cassette | Epic | |
