= Rage Against the Machine (album) =

1992 studio album by Rage Against the Machine

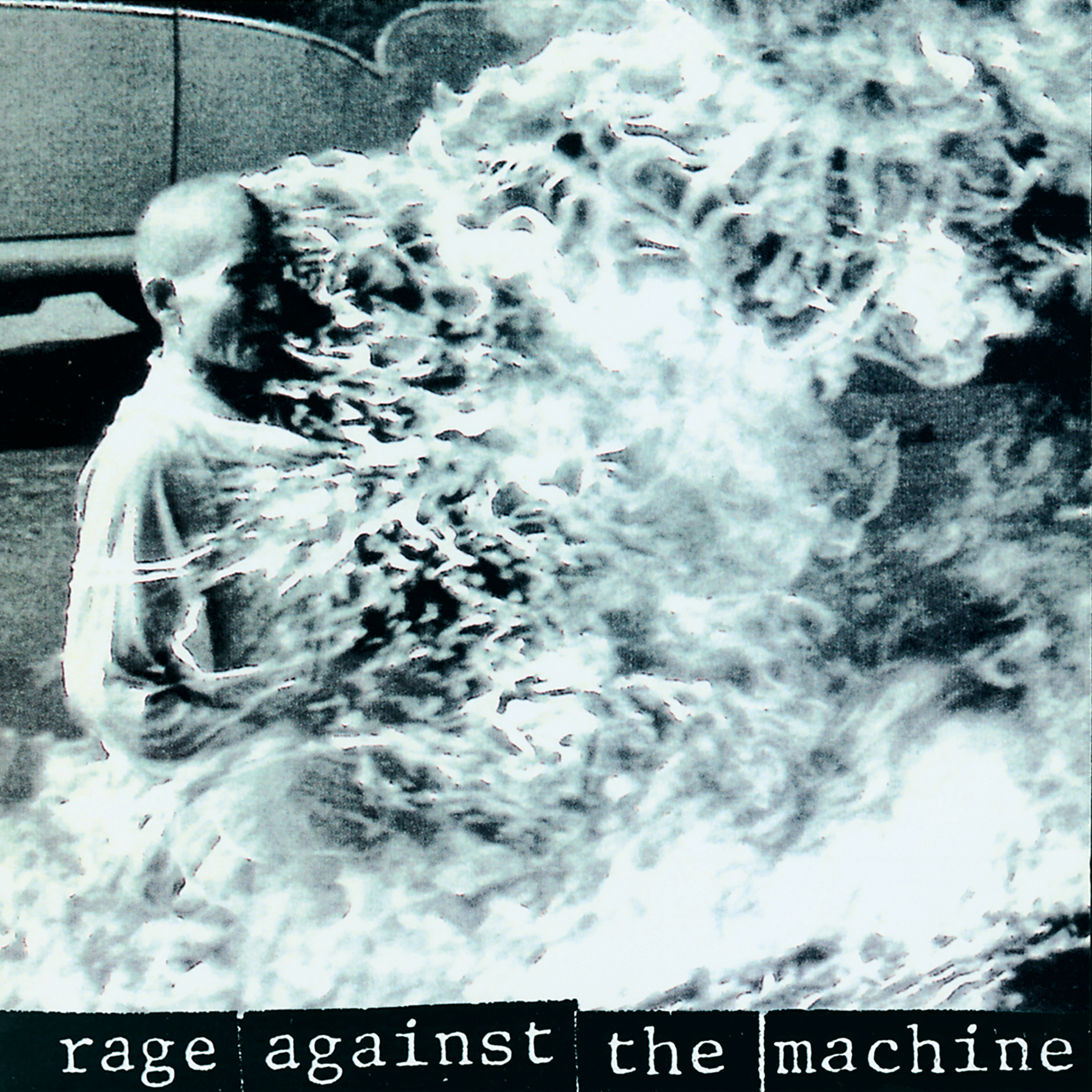

Studio album by Rage Against the Machine
- Released: November 3, 1992
- Recorded: April–May 1992
- Studios: Sound City (Van Nuys, California); Industrial Recording (North Hollywood, California); Scream (Studio City, California)
- Genres: Rap metal; funk metal; alternative metal; rap rock
- Length: 52:55
- Label: Epic
- Producers: GGGarth; Rage Against the Machine

Rage Against the Machine chronology
Rage Against the Machine (1991)	Rage Against the Machine (1992)	Evil Empire (1996)

Singles from Rage Against the Machine
- 1. "Killing in the Name" Released: October 20, 1992; 2. "Bullet in the Head" Released: April 26, 1993; 3. "Bombtrack" Released: June 7, 1993; 4. "Freedom" Released: December 6, 1993

Rage Against the Machine is the debut studio album by American rock band Rage Against the Machine, released on November 3, 1992, by Epic Records. The album was based largely on the band's first commercial demo tape of the same name, completed 11 months prior to the album's release. The tape contained earlier recordings of seven of the ten songs.

With politically themed, revolutionary lyrical content, the album artwork was notable for its graphic photograph of Vietnamese monk Thích Quảng Đức performing self-immolation in June 1963.

The album was a critical success upon release, with several critics noting the album's politically motivated agenda and praising frontman Zack de la Rocha's strong vocal delivery. Ranked number 24 on Rolling Stone's list of the "100 Greatest Metal Albums of All Time", the album peaked at number 1 on the US Billboard Heatseekers chart and number 45 on the US Billboard 200 and has gone on to achieve a triple platinum sales certification from the Recording Industry Association of America (RIAA) in the US. In 2020, it was ranked 221 in Rolling Stone's updated list of the "500 Greatest Albums of All Time".

== Music ==
Many reviews describe the sound as a mixture of rap with rock or metal. In Andrew Flory and John Covach's analysis:

Taking their cue from Faith No More and the Red Hot Chili Peppers, the Los Angeles–based band Rage Against the Machine blended hard-driving rock with mostly rapped vocals to establish a stylistic model many later bands would follow. Their first album, Rage Against the Machine, evinced the group’s dedication to political causes while musically drawing much from the Chili Peppers’ blend of funk grooves and heavy metal riffs. Zack de la Rocha’s vocals shared the spotlight with Tom Morello’s innovative guitar playing, which blended metal, blues rock, and jazz, and at times imitated the sound of DJ scratching.

== Artwork and packaging ==
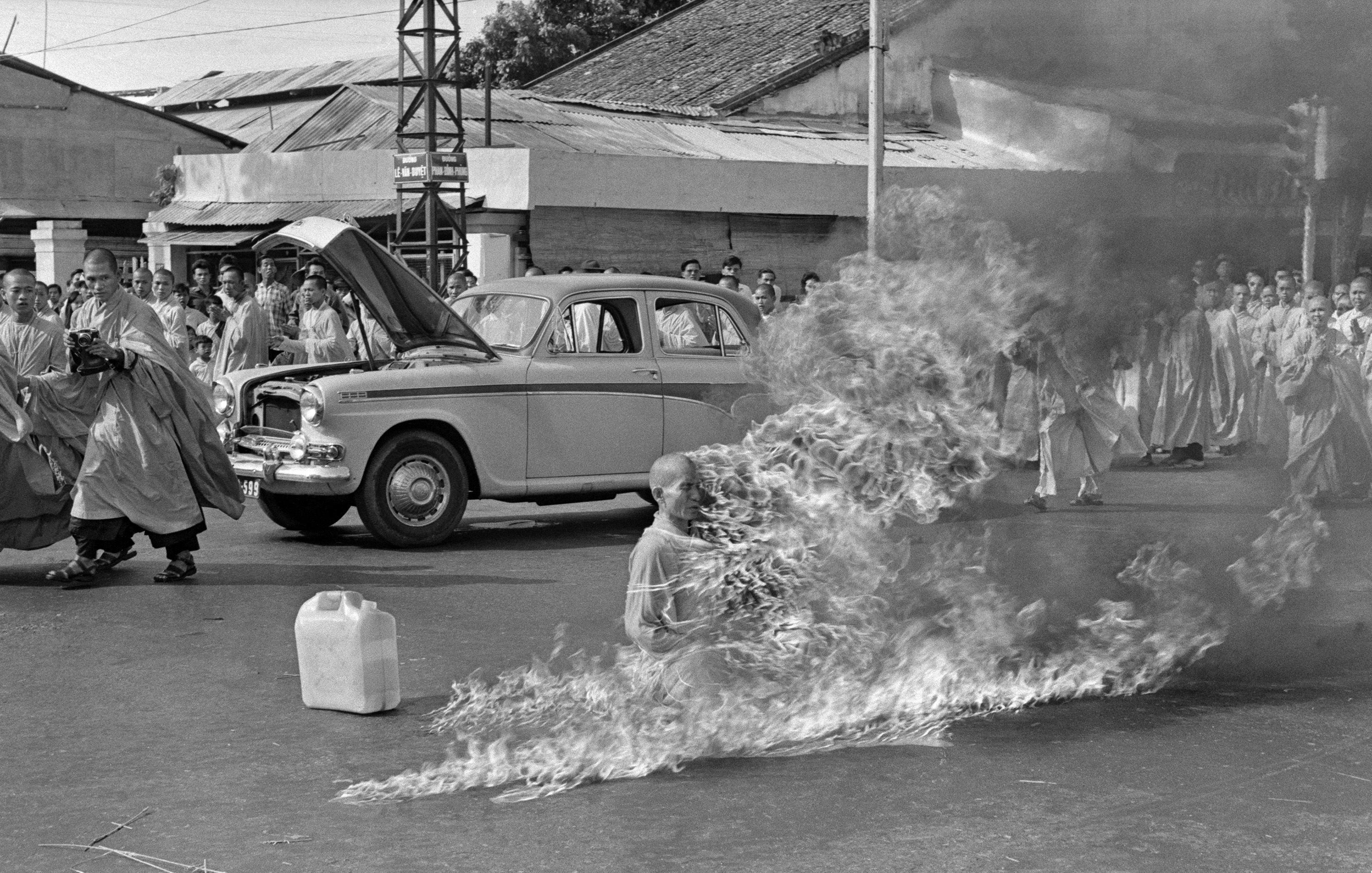
The self-immolation of Thích Quảng Đức in June 1963 in resistance to South Vietnam's persecution of Buddhists. The photograph was used as inspiration for the album's cover art.

The cover features a crop of Malcolm Browne's famous photograph of the self-immolation of Thích Quảng Đức, a Vietnamese Buddhist monk, in Saigon in 1963.

The songs on Rage Against the Machine all feature political messages. Activists such as Provisional IRA hunger striker Bobby Sands and Black Panther Party founder Huey P. Newton are listed in the "Thanks For Inspiration" section. Also thanked were Ian and Alec MacKaye.

The lyrics for each song were printed in the album booklet with the exception of those for "Killing in the Name", which were omitted; the booklet reads "2. KILLING IN THE NAME", skips the lyrics and continues with the next song.

The statement "no samples, keyboards or synthesizers used in the making of this record" can be found at the end of the sleeve notes. Similar statements were made in the band's subsequent albums. The band also refer to themselves as "Guilty Parties" for each album.

== Touring and promotion ==
The album was supported by the Rage Against the Machine Tour, which commenced on January 15, 1993, in Chicago and concluded on December 31, 1993, in Detroit. Rage Against The Machine was accompanied by opening acts in certain concerts, such as hip hop groups House of Pain and Cypress Hill.

== Critical reception ==
Professional ratings
Review scores
Source	Rating
AllMusic	5/5 stars
Blender	4/5 stars
Encyclopedia of Popular Music	5/5 stars
Los Angeles Times	3.5/4 stars
Metal Hammer	4/5
NME	7/10
Pitchfork	9.1/10
The Rolling Stone Album Guide	4/5 stars
Select	4/5

Rage Against the Machine received critical acclaim. In a contemporary review, NME wrote that "what makes RATM more than just another bunch of prodigiously capable genre-benders is their total lack of pretension or contrivance ... the results burn with an undeniable conviction." Q magazine deemed it "a record of real attitude and energy", while Los Angeles Times critic Robert Hilburn hailed it as "a striking, politically conscious debut" and de la Rocha "a bona fide star who combines on stage a Bob Marley-like charisma and a Chuck D.-style rap command -- and the music itself is as tough and relentless as his raps."

Robert Christgau was somewhat less impressed in The Village Voice, summing it up as "metal for rap-lovers—and opera-haters" while naming "Know Your Enemy" and "Wake Up" as highlights. AllMusic reviewer Eduardo Rivadavia wrote in a retrospective review, "it was the first album to successfully merge the seemingly disparate sounds of rap and heavy metal", he also praised the album's "meaningful rhymes and emotionally charged conviction" calling it "essential".

In 2001, Q named Rage Against the Machine as one of the 50 Heaviest Albums of All Time. The album is included in the book 1001 Albums You Must Hear Before You Die. In 2003, the album was ranked number 368 on Rolling Stone magazine's list of The 500 Greatest Albums of All Time, climbing to number 365 in the 2012 revision and shooting up to number 221 in the 2020 reboot of the list. It was ranked number 24 on the magazine's list of "100 Greatest Metal Albums of All Time".

In December 2008, BBC Radio 1 DJ Zane Lowe included Rage Against the Machine as one of 28 albums in his 'Masterpieces' series. In October 2011, Rage Against the Machine was ranked number five on Guitar World magazine's top ten list of guitar albums of 1992.

== Rerelease ==
Professional ratings
Aggregate scores
Source	Rating
Metacritic	87/100
Review scores
Source	Rating
The Austin Chronicle	4/5 stars
Consequence	B
Metal Hammer	4/5 stars
Mojo	4/5 stars
PopMatters	7/10
Record Collector	5/5 stars
Rolling Stone	4.5/5 stars
Spectrum Culture	4/5

The band announced on October 9, 2012, via their Facebook page that they would be releasing a special 20th anniversary box set to commemorate the group's debut album. The box set contains never-before-released concert material, including the band's 2010 Live at Finsbury Park show and footage from early in their career, as well as a digitally remastered version of the album, B-sides and the original demo tape (on disc for the first time). The collection was released on November 27, 2012. According to the review aggregator Metacritic, Rage Against The Machine XX [20th Anniversary Edition] received "universal acclaim" based on a weighted average score of 87 out of 100 from 12 critic scores.

The release features three distinct versions:

- Deluxe box set featuring two CDs, two DVDs, one 12-inch 180gm vinyl LP, one 40 page booklet and two-sided poster
- Special edition featuring two CDs and a bonus DVD featuring six tracks
- Single compact disc (with three bonus tracks)

== Track listing ==
All tracks are written by Rage Against the Machine (Tim Commerford, Zack de la Rocha, Tom Morello, Brad Wilk).

Original track listing
No.	Title	Length
1.	"Bombtrack"	4:02
2.	"Killing in the Name"	5:14
3.	"Take the Power Back"	5:36
4.	"Settle for Nothing"	4:49
5.	"Bullet in the Head"	5:08
6.	"Know Your Enemy" (featuring Maynard James Keenan)	4:57
7.	"Wake Up"	6:06
8.	"Fistful of Steel"	5:32
9.	"Township Rebellion"	5:22
10.	"Freedom"	6:06
Total length:		52:55

XX CD 1 – Bonus tracks (B-sides)
No.	Title	Length
11.	"Bombtrack" (live; taken from the "Bombtrack" single)	5:56
12.	"Bullet in the Head" (live; taken from the "Bullet in the Head" single)	5:44
13.	"Take the Power Back" (live; taken from the "Freedom" single)	6:09
Total length:		70:45

XX CD 2 – "The Original Demos"
No.	Title	Length
1.	"Bombtrack"	4:05
2.	"Take the Power Back"	5:40
3.	"Bullet in the Head"	5:09
4.	"Darkness of Greed"	3:40
5.	"Clear the Lane"	3:48
6.	"Township Rebellion"	4:19
7.	"Know Your Enemy"	4:19
8.	"Mindset's a Threat"	3:56
9.	"Killing in the Name"	6:28
10.	"Auto Logic"	4:07
11.	"The Narrows"	4:35
12.	"Freedom"	5:40
Total length:		55:51

XX DVD 1 – The Battle of Britain at Finsbury Park, London, England (June 6, 2010)
No.	Title	Length
1.	"Intro"	2:37
2.	"Testify"	4:35
3.	"Bombtrack"	4:24
4.	"People of the Sun"	2:36
5.	"Know Your Enemy"	5:17
6.	"Bulls on Parade"	4:51
7.	"Township Rebellion"	5:44
8.	"Bullet in the Head"	10:32
9.	"White Riot" (The Clash cover)	2:06
10.	"Guerrilla Radio"	3:45
11.	"Sleep Now in the Fire"	5:26
12.	"Freedom"	8:53
13.	"Killing in the Name"	6:32
14.	"End Credits"	2:52

XX DVD 1 – Music videos
No.	Title	Length
1.	"Killing in the Name - 1992"	5:15
2.	"Bullet in the Head - 1993"	4:51
3.	"Bombtrack - 1993"	4:06
4.	"Freedom - 1993"	6:01
5.	"Bulls on Parade - 1996"	3:56
6.	"People of the Sun - 1996"	3:00
7.	"No Shelter - 1998"	4:15
8.	"Guerrilla Radio - 1999"	3:43
9.	"Sleep Now in the Fire - 2000" (First Official Commercial Release)	3:55
10.	"Testify - 2000" (First Official Commercial Release)	3:44
11.	"Renegades of Funk - 2000" (First Official Commercial Release)	3:54
12.	"How I Could Just Kill a Man - 2000" (Previously Unreleased)	4:24

XX DVD 1 – Live material from 1997 video compilation
No.	Title	Length
1.	"The Ghost of Tom Joad"	5:13
2.	"Vietnow" (Irvine Meadows, CA – 1997)	4:49
3.	"People of the Sun"	2:38
4.	"Bulls on Parade"	3:50
5.	"Bullet in the Head"	5:48
6.	"Zapata's Blood" (Rock Am Ring Festival, Germany – 1996)	1:45
7.	"Know Your Enemy"	5:20
8.	"Bombtrack"	4:09
9.	"Tire Me" (Reading Festival – 1996)	2:55
10.	"Killing in the Name" (Pink Pop Festival – 1994)	6:21

XX DVD 2 – First public performance at California State University, Northridge (October 23, 1991)
No.	Title	Length
1.	"Killing in the Name"	2:20
2.	"Take the Power Back"	6:34
3.	"Autologic"	4:14
4.	"Bullet in the Head"	5:48
5.	"Hit the Deck"	4:27
6.	"Township Rebellion"	5:33
7.	"Darkness of Greed"	3:59
8.	"Clear the Lane"	4:19
9.	"Clampdown"	3:48
10.	"Know Your Enemy"	5:03
11.	"Freedom"	5:45

XX DVD 2
No.	Title	Length
1.	"Freedom" (Pink Pop – 1994)	6:40
2.	"Take the Power Back" (Vic Theatre – 1993)	6:05
3.	"Fistful of Steel" (JC Dobbs – 1993)	5:22
4.	"Bombtrack" (Soundstage performance – 1992)	3:58
5.	"Wake Up" (Halfway House – 1992)	5:35
6.	"Settle for Nothing" (Castaic – 1992)	4:35
7.	"Clear the Lane" (San Luis Obispo – 1992)	3:38
8.	"Untitled" (CWNN – 1992)	5:10
9.	"Darkness of Greed" (Zed's Records – 1992)	3:32
10.	"Wake Up" (Nomads – 1992)	6:18

Anger Is a Gift bonus disc – released with the 1995 Australian CD re-release

1. "Darkness" – 3:40
2. "Year of the Boomerang" – 4:02
3. "Freedom" (Remix) – 6:14
4. "Take the Power Back" (Live) – 6:12

Bonus Maxi 12-inch from the "Limited Tour Edition" red vinyl 1993 European re-release included this second LP labeled sides C and D

1. C1 "Freedom" (Live) – 6:13
2. C2 "Bombtrack" (From Mark Goodier's "Evening Session") – 4:08
3. C3 "Bullet in the Head" (Remix) – 5:40
4. D1 "Darkness of Greed" – 3:40
5. D2 "Bullet in the Head" (Live) – 5:44
6. D3 "Bombtrack" (Live) – 5:33

All songs from both bonuses are the versions from previously released singles and promos, except C1 which is from a different performance. No information is given on the 12-inch about the date nor venue.

== Personnel ==
Rage Against the Machine

- Zack de la Rocha – vocals, production, art direction
- Tom Morello – guitar, production, art direction
- Timmy C. – bass, backing vocals, production, art direction
- Brad Wilk – drums, percussion, production, art direction

Additional musicians

- Maynard James Keenan – additional vocals on "Know Your Enemy"
- Stephen Perkins – additional percussion on "Know Your Enemy"

Technical

- Craig Doubet – assistant engineer
- Stan Katayama – engineer
- Nicky Lindeman – art direction
- Bob Ludwig – mastering
- Garth Richardson – production, engineering
- Jeff Sheehan – assistant engineer
- Steve Sisco – mixing assistant
- Andy Wallace – mixing
- Vlado Meller – 2012 remaster
- Steve Hoffman – 2016 Hybrid SACD remaster

== Charts ==
=== Weekly charts ===
Chart (1993–1996)	Peak position
Australian Albums (ARIA)	12
Belgian Albums (Ultratop Wallonia)	37
Dutch Albums (Album Top 100)	5
French Albums (SNEP)	8
German Albums (Offizielle Top 100)	22
New Zealand Albums (RMNZ)	9
Swedish Albums (Sverigetopplistan)	22
Swiss Albums (Schweizer Hitparade)	16
UK Albums (Official Charts)	17
US Billboard 200	45
US Top Catalog Albums (Billboard)	2
US Heatseekers Albums (Billboard)	1
Chart (2002)	Peak position
Irish Albums (IRMA)	24
Chart (2006)	Peak position
UK Rock & Metal Albums (Official Charts)	2
Chart (2008)	Peak position
Scottish Albums (Official Charts)	34
UK Album Downloads (Official Charts)	1
Chart (2012)	Peak position
Belgian Albums (Ultratop Flanders)	81
US Vinyl Albums (Billboard)	2
Chart (2017)	Peak position
Hungarian Albums (MAHASZ)	30
Chart (2020–2025)	Peak position
Portuguese Albums (AFP)	48
Canadian Albums (Billboard)	49
US Top Alternative Albums (Billboard)	10
US Top Hard Rock Albums (Billboard)	4
US Top Rock Albums (Billboard)	21

=== Year-end charts ===
Chart (1993)	Position
New Zealand Albums (RMNZ)	9
Chart (1994)	Position
New Zealand Albums (RMNZ)	16

== Certifications ==
Region	Certification	Certified units/sales
Australia (ARIA)	5× Platinum	350,000^{^}
Austria (IFPI Austria)	Gold	25,000^{*}
Belgium (BRMA)	Gold	25,000^{*}
Canada (Music Canada)	Platinum	100,000^{^}
Denmark (IFPI Danmark)	5× Platinum	100,000^{‡}
France (SNEP)	Platinum	300,000^{*}
Germany (BVMI)	Gold	250,000^{^}
Italy (FIMI) sales since 2009	Platinum	50,000^{‡}
Japan (RIAJ)	Gold	100,000^{^}
Netherlands (NVPI)	Platinum	100,000^{^}
New Zealand (RMNZ)	3× Platinum	45,000^{‡}
Switzerland (IFPI Switzerland)	Gold	25,000^{^}
United Kingdom (BPI)	3× Platinum	900,000^{‡}
United States (RIAA)	3× Platinum	3,000,000^{^}
^{*} Sales figures based on certification alone.^{^} Shipments figures based on certification alone.^{‡} Sales+streaming figures based on certification alone.
