= Freedom (Rage Against the Machine song) =

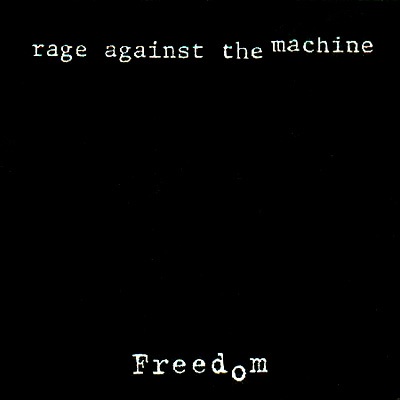

Single by Rage Against the Machine

from the album Rage Against the Machine
- Released: December 6, 1993
- Genre: Funk metal; rap metal
- Length: 6:06
- Label: Epic
- Songwriters: Tim Commerford; Zack de la Rocha; Tom Morello; Brad Wilk
- Producers: Garth "GGGarth" Richardson; Rage Against the Machine

Rage Against the Machine singles chronology
"Bombtrack" (1994)	"Freedom" (1993)	"Year of tha Boomerang" (1994)

Music video
- "Freedom" on YouTube

"Freedom" is a song by American rock band Rage Against the Machine, released as the fourth and final single from their self-titled album in December 1993.

== Music video ==
The video for "Freedom" was directed by Peter Christopherson and produced by Fiz Oliver at Squeak Pictures. It premiered on MTV's 120 Minutes on December 19, 1993. According to CVC Broadcast & Cable Top 50 chart, "Freedom" was the Number 1 promo in January 1994.

=== Synopsis ===
The video is focused on the case for Leonard Peltier, who was one of the leaders of the American Indian Movement (AIM). The band is performing live in a small venue throughout the video. During the video, footage from the Peltier case is examined and detailed with shots of Peltier and other members of AIM. There is also a reenactment of what took place on the Pine Ridge Indian Reservation. The footage of this reenactment is from Michael Apted's 1992 documentary Incident at Oglala.

During most of the video, quotes from Sitting Bull and general AIM information taken from Peter Matthiessen's 1983 study of the Peltier case, In the Spirit of Crazy Horse, scroll along the bottom of the screen. The video ends with a plea for Peltier to be released, followed by picture of Peltier in prison and the phrase "justice has not been done".

Over 30 years after this video, U.S. President Joe Biden commuted Peltier's sentence from life imprisonment to home confinement on January 20, 2025.

== Track listing ==
1. "Freedom"
2. "Freedom" (Live)
3. "Take the Power Back" (Live)

== See also ==
- List of anti-war songs
