= Killing in the Name =

1992 single by Rage Against the Machine

- US promotional CD single

Single by Rage Against the Machine

from the album Rage Against the Machine
- Released: October 20, 1992
- Genre: Rap metal; alternative metal
- Length: 5:14
- Label: Epic
- Songwriters: Tim Commerford; Zack de la Rocha; Tom Morello; Brad Wilk
- Producers: Rage Against the Machine; Garth Richardson

Rage Against the Machine singles chronology
"Killing in the Name" (1992)	"Bullet in the Head" (1992)

Audio sample
- file; help

Music video
- "Killing in the Name" on YouTube

"Killing in the Name" is a song by the American rock band Rage Against the Machine, released on their debut studio album, Rage Against the Machine (1992). It was serviced to US radio on October 20, 1992, as a promotional single. It features heavy drop-D guitar riffs.

"Killing in the Name" reached number 25 on the UK singles chart. In 2009, following a public campaign protesting against the British talent show The X Factor, "Killing in the Name" became the UK Christmas number one. Rolling Stone ranked it at 207 in its 2021 list of the "500 Greatest Songs of All Time".

== Writing ==
The guitarist, Tom Morello, wrote the "Killing the Name" riff while teaching a guitar student how to use drop-D tuning; he briefly paused the lesson to record the riff. Rage Against the Machine worked on the song the next day. According to Morello, it was a collaborative effort, combining his riff with Tim Commerford's "magmalike" bass, Brad Wilk's "funky, brutal" drumming and vocalist Zack de la Rocha's "conviction". Morello recorded his part on a Fender Telecaster and played the solo with a Whammy pedal. The song has been linked by critics to the police brutality suffered by Rodney King and the subsequent 1992 Los Angeles riots.

== Music ==
"Killing in the Name" combines elements of hardcore punk and hip hop and has been described as rap metal, funk metal, alternative metal, and hard rock. The journalist Peter Buckley described it as "a howling, expletive-driven tirade against the ills of American society". The song builds in intensity, as de la Rocha chants the line "Fuck you, I won't do what you tell me", building in a crescendo the next four times and aggressively screaming the line the final eight times, culminating with the scream "Motherfucker!"

The refrain "some of those that work forces are the same that burn crosses" draws a link between the Los Angeles Police Department and the Ku Klux Klan. According to BBC News, "Killing in the Name" protests the military–industrial complex, justifying killing for "the chosen whites".

== Release ==
"Killing in the Name" was released as part of a 12-song self-released cassette. It was serviced to US radio on October 20, 1992, as the first single from their self-titled debut studio album (1992). In January 2025, "Killing in the Name" became the first Rage Against the Machine song to surpass one billion streams on Spotify.

On February 21, 1993, the BBC Radio 1 DJ Bruno Brookes accidentally played the uncensored version of the song on his Top 40 Countdown, leading to 138 complaints. Brookes was recording an advertisement for the following week's Top 40 Countdown while the song played. In November 2008, the song was played over the speakers in an Asda supermarket in Preston, England, prompting complaints from customers. Asda issued an apology.

== Use in political campaigns ==
In 2012, Morello demanded the right-wing UK Independence Party stop using "Killing in the Name" in rallies. Following the 2020 United States elections, a video of pro-Trump protesters dancing to "Killing in the Name" was widely shared on social media. Commentators saw it as a misappropriation of the song. Rage Against the Machine responded in a tweet: "They just don't GET IT do they?"

In 2022, Reuters Fact Check concluded that a viral video purportedly showing North Korea's military choir covering "Killing in the Name" had been digitally altered. Its audio was taken from a video uploaded to YouTube in 2019 of an event when a thousand musicians gathered to perform inside Frankfurt's Waldstadion. The montage of clips of the large choir and footage of the North Korea's military arsenal such as tanks and missiles had been edited together to mislead viewers.

== 2009 UK Christmas number one campaign ==
In early December 2009, the English DJ Jon Morter and his wife, Tracy Morter, launched a group on Facebook encouraging people to buy "Killing in the Name" in the week before Christmas. They hoped to prevent the winner of The X Factor, a televised singing competition, from achieving the UK Christmas number one for the fifth year running. That year's X Factor winner was Joe McElderry, who released a cover of the Miley Cyrus song "The Climb" as the Christmas single. On December 15, the Facebook group had more than 750,000 members.

As the X Factor song was donating some profits to charity, the Rage Against X Factor campaign encouraged supporters also to give to charity. A Justgiving page was created to raise money for the homeless charity Shelter. As of 20 December, it had raised over £70,000 (approximately $110,000).

After the X Factor creator, Simon Cowell, denounced the campaign as "stupid" and "cynical", it gained more attention and was mentioned on UK news channels, radio stations and websites. Rage Against the Machine added their support. Morello said that achieving the Christmas number one would be "a wonderful dose of anarchy" and that he planned to donate the proceeds to charity. The campaign was supported by musicians and celebrities including Dave Grohl, Muse, Them Crooked Vultures, Kasabian, Liam Howlett and the Prodigy. It also received support from Paul McCartney, who had appeared on The X Factor with the finalists, and the X Factor contestants Jedward. Critics noted that both The X Factor and Rage Against the Machine are signed to labels that are part of Sony BMG; Morello dismissed conspiracy claims as ridiculous.

Rage Against the Machine attracted controversy when they performed "Killing in the Name" uncensored on BBC Radio 5 Live in mid-December 2009, despite the hosts asking them to censor the expletives. During the crescendo, de la Rocha began singing "I won't do what you tell me", with a pause where he normally sings "fuck you". After a few lines, he screamed "Fuck you, I won't do what you tell me" repeatedly. The hosts Nicky Campbell and Shelagh Fogarty apologized.

On December 20, 2009, "Killing in the Name" became the first download-only single to become the UK Christmas number one, selling more than 500,000 copies. It was the closest race for the UK Christmas number one since 1998, when "Goodbye" by the Spice Girls competed with the South Park single "Chocolate Salty Balls". "Killing in the Name" was certified for the Guinness world record for "fastest-selling digital track (UK)", after recording 502,672 downloads in its first week. The following week, "Killing in the Name" dropped to number two, behind "The Climb". It fell to number 40 the week after and number 100 the following week. The campaign spread to Ireland, where, like the UK, the Christmas number one had been dominated by X Factor finalists for five years. "Killing in the Name" reached number two on the Irish Singles Chart, behind "The Climb".

Rage Against the Machine had promised to hold a free concert if "Killing in the Name" reached number one. On June 6, 2010, they held a concert for 40,000 people in Finsbury Park, London. De la Rocha told the audience: "It was all of you that made this happen — you were the weapon." The band invited Jon and Tracy Morter on stage to present the proceeds of the campaign to charity. The concert opened with an animated skit of Cowell saying "I am Simon Cowell. I am the biggest star maker in the world — and I am a supernova." It ended with a video montage of media quotes accompanied by "The Climb", followed by a performance of "Killing in the Name".

== Music video ==
The video was produced and directed by Peter Gideon, a guitar student of Tom Morello who had a video camera. It was filmed during two shows in small Los Angeles venues, the Whisky a Go Go and the Club With No Name. Released in December 1992, the uncensored version was shown on European MTV but was banned on American MTV because of the explicit lyrics. The video did not receive heavy airplay in the US due to the explicit lyrics, but received substantial airplay in Europe and drove the band's popularity abroad. It was released on Rage Against the Machine: The Video.

In 2021, in a collaboration with the arts collective the Ummah Chroma, Rage Against the Machine released a 15-minute documentary about the making of "Killing in the Name". It features anti-racist activist Tim Wise and contains footage of an interview with de la Rocha, who says that capitalist society "should not stand. It should be challenged and questioned and overthrown."

== Legacy ==
In 2002, Rolling Stone named "Killing in the Name" the 24th-greatest "guitar song". It ranked it at 207 in its 2021 list of the "500 Greatest Songs of All Time". In 2023, it named it the 38th-greatest heavy metal song. "Killing in the Name" reached number two in the 2009 edition of the Triple J's Hottest 100 of All Time, a poll of more than half a million votes conducted by the Australian radio station Triple J. In 2007, Guitar World named Morello's "Killing in the Name" solo the 89th-greatest guitar solo. In 2010, the New Statesman named "Killing in the Name" the 12th-greatest political song, as voted for by the UK Political Studies Association. In December 2021, the Official Charts Company announced that "Killing in the Name" had been voted the UK's favourite Christmas number one by the British public. In June 2026, CBS News named "Killing in the Name" one of the 250 essential songs of the preceding 250 years.

== Live performances ==
Rage Against the Machine burning the American flag while playing "Killing in the Name" at Woodstock '99.

The song was performed as an extended instrumental at their first public performance at Cal State Northridge, on October 23, 1991. Bassist Tim Commerford is known to chant the backing vocals of "now you do what they told ya" of the chorus during most live performances.

Zack de la Rocha sometimes changed the lyrics in the second verse from "Some of those that work forces are the same that burn crosses" to "Some of those that burn crosses are the same that hold office" when playing live. The band Audioslave, which included some members of Rage Against the Machine, performed versions of "Killing in the Name".

Rage Against the Machine performed the song live in 1999 at the Woodstock '99 festival, burning the American flag during the song. In this performance, de la Rocha changed the lyrics to "Some of those that work forces are the same that burn churches".

On January 30, 2026, at the Minneapolis Concert of Solidarity and Resistance to Defend Minnesota, Tom Morello performed "Killing in the Name" at First Avenue. The concert was held in solidarity with the Minneapolis, Twin Cities, and greater Minnesota communities defending their neighbors and protesting against federal immigration actions. Bruce Springsteen joined the concert with the live debut of The Streets of Minneapolis, followed by Morello joining Springsteen on "The Ghost of Tom Joad". The concert was held at midday, before the protest march being held that afternoon in Minneapolis.

== Track listing ==
No.	Title	Length
1.	"Killing in the Name"	5:13
2.	"Darkness of Greed"	3:40
3.	"Clear the Lane"	3:47
Total length:		12:40

"Darkness of Greed" and "Clear the Lane" were re-mastered versions of the respective demo tracks. Another version of "Darkness of Greed", titled merely "Darkness", was included on the 1994 soundtrack album for The Crow. The previously unreleased demo appeared on the XX 20th Anniversary Edition of their debut album, which was released on November 27, 2012.

== Personnel ==
- Zack de la Rocha – vocals
- Tom Morello – guitar
- Tim Commerford – bass guitar, backing vocals
- Brad Wilk – drums, percussion

== Charts ==
=== Weekly charts ===
Chart (1993)	Peak position
Australia (ARIA)	7
Europe (Eurochart Hot 100)	90
Iceland (Íslenski Listinn Topp 40)	16
Netherlands (Dutch Top 40)	16
Netherlands (Single Top 100)	13
New Zealand (Recorded Music NZ)	8
UK Singles (Official Charts)	25

Chart (2009–2010)	Peak position
Euro Digital Song Sales (Billboard)	1
Ireland (IRMA)	2
Scottish Singles Sales (Official Charts)	2
UK Singles (Official Charts)	1
UK Rock & Metal (Official Charts)	1

Chart (2013)	Peak position
France (SNEP)	109

Chart (2019)	Peak position
US Hot Rock & Alternative Songs (Billboard)	25

=== Year-end charts ===
Chart (1993)	Position
Australia (ARIA)	25
New Zealand (RIANZ)	32
Netherlands (Single Top 100)	78

=== Decade-end charts ===
Chart (2000–2009)	Position
UK Top 100 Songs of the Decade	36

=== All-time charts ===
Chart	Position
UK Download Chart (All Time)	79

== Certifications ==
Region	Certification	Certified units/sales
Australia (ARIA)	Platinum	70,000^{^}
Denmark (IFPI Danmark)	Gold	45,000^{‡}
Germany (BVMI)	Platinum	600,000^{‡}
Italy (FIMI)	Platinum	70,000^{‡}
New Zealand (RMNZ)	6× Platinum	180,000^{‡}
Spain (Promusicae)	Platinum	60,000^{‡}
United Kingdom (BPI)	3× Platinum	1,800,000^{‡}
^{^} Shipments figures based on certification alone.^{‡} Sales+streaming figures based on certification alone.

== Release history ==
Release dates and formats for "Killing in the Name"
Region	Date	Format(s)	Label(s)	Ref.
United States	October 20, 1992	Radio	Epic	
United Kingdom	February 15, 1993	7-inch vinyl; 12-inch vinyl; CD	Epic	
Australia	May 17, 1993	CD; cassette	Epic	

== Other uses ==
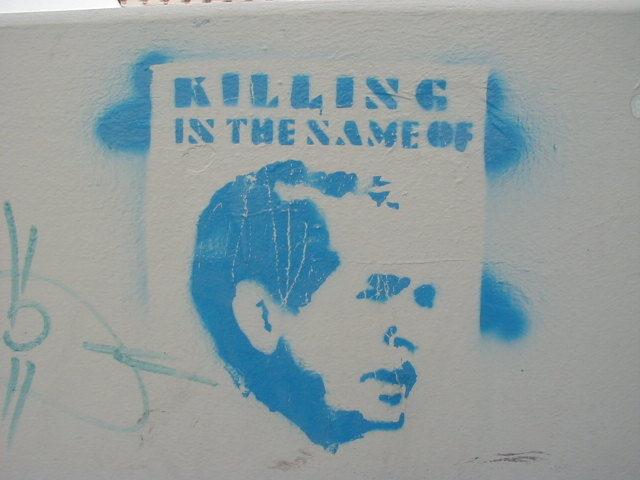
Lyrics from "Killing in the Name" appear throughout popular culture.

During one of his last performances before he died, American comedian Bill Hicks ended a set by smashing his microphone against a stool while singing along to "Killing in the Name" playing over the loudspeakers.

As part of the US war on terror, the song was used by military interrogators at the Guantanamo Bay detention camp. Music was played at painfully high volume levels for hours on end, as a form of psychological torture. "The fact that music I helped create was used in crimes against humanity sickens me," noted Morello.

During the 2019–20 Chilean protests, the song was covered with some of the lyrics modified alluding to the Chilean police force's misuse of violence in repressing peaceful protestors.

On June 29, 2022, a Vancouver radio station, CKKS-FM (branded on-air as KISS Radio), stunted by repeatedly played "Killing In The Name" for 30 hours. The song was repeatedly played on loop after the station dropped its hot adult contemporary format, resulting in the firing of its airstaff. The station occasionally paused the loop to take call-in requests, only to continue playing the song. At 6:00 AM PDT on June 30, 2022, the station rebranded to "Sonic", which plays a modern rock format.

== Cover versions and parodies ==
- In July 2007, a remix of the song by SebastiAn (miscredited as a Mr. Oizo remix) was Zane Lowe's "Hottest Record in the World" on his show on BBC Radio 1.
- In June 2007, funk band The Apples from Tel Aviv, Israel, released a cover on a 7" vinyl on Freestyle Records.
- On 22 August 2008, Scottish alt-rock band Biffy Clyro performed a re-worked acoustic cover version of "Killing in the Name" on Jo Whiley's show at The Reading Festival on BBC Radio 1. The band agreed that, for this live broadcast, they would not use expletives and sung just the melody in place of "Fuck you" in the song. The crowd were bound by no such agreement and began an impromptu mass sing along with "Fuck you" in place, audible by the recording equipment. As this broadcast was going out live at lunchtime, Jo Whiley was required to apologize on air after the performance.
- French band La Maison Tellier released a country-folk version of "Killing in the Name" in their first album (2006).
- In 2008, Icelandic electronica group FM Belfast released a single called "Lotus", a minimal electro cover version of "Killing in the Name".
- Slovak DJ and producer L-Plus released a drum and bass remix of "Killing in the Name" in 2008.
- Australian rock group FourPlay String Quartet recorded a version of the song for their 2009 album Fourthcoming.
- On July 4, 2010, American jam band Phish covered the song after introducing Rage Against the Machine as "one of the only other bands, other than Phish, that won't bullshit you."
- New York-based band Emmure covered the song at the Hoodwink Festival along with "Bulls on Parade".
- Zac Brown Band has covered the song on several occasions during their live performances.
- Richard Cheese recorded a version the song in the style of lounge music for his 2011 album A Lounge Supreme.
- Bonded by Blood covered the song in their 2012 album The Aftermath.
- Lauren Mayberry recorded a cover version of the song along with her band, Blue Sky Archives.
- Limp Bizkit covered the song live at Download Festival 2013 and Reading and Leeds Festival 2015.
- Prophets of Rage, an American rap rock supergroup, formed in 2016 and including several former members of RATM, recorded a live rendition of "Killing in the Name" in 2016.
- Cassetteboy parodied the song with the cut-up song "Rage Against the Party Machine", using spliced excerpts from Boris Johnson's speeches, satirizing the Partygate scandal in the United Kingdom, where Johnson, other Conservative Party members, and government staff had had multiple gatherings in violation of lockdown rules in the United Kingdom during the COVID-19 pandemic.
- Starbomb parodied the song, titling it "Filling in the Name Of". The song is about "a long Tetris piece who begins to lament his place in life after being used constantly to finish Tetris puzzles". It was released on the group's third and final album The Tryforce in 2019.
- Machine Gun Kelly and Blink-182 drummer Travis Barker covered this song in 2020 as part of a protest movement preceded by the murder of George Floyd by a local US police.
- Dutch producer Sefa made a Frenchcore version of the song in his 2022 album Klaagzang.
