= Swizz Beatz production discography =

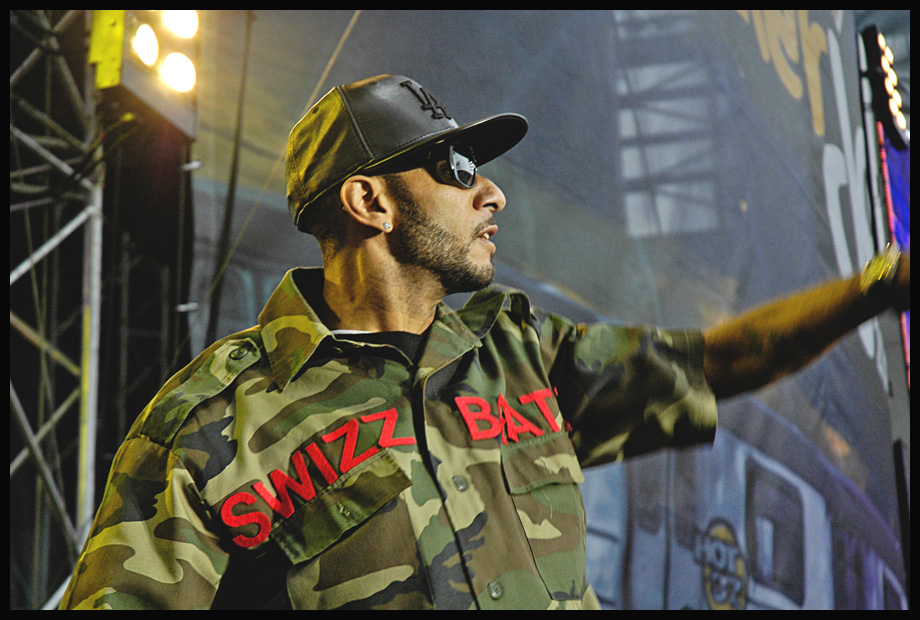
Swizz Beatz performing at Hot 97's Summer Jam 2007 in the MetLife Stadium

The following list is a discography of production by Swizz Beatz, an American producer and rapper from The Bronx, New York. It includes a list of songs produced, co-produced and remixed by year, artist, album and title. With a career spanning three decades, Swizz Beatz has contributed production on over 160 albums, including studio projects, compilations, soundtracks and mixtapes. Beatz has also produced 81 singles, a number of them have received gold certification or higher by the Recording Industry Association of America (RIAA).

== Singles produced ==
List of singles as either producer or co-producer, with selected chart positions and certifications, showing year released, performing artists and album name
Title	Year	Peak chart positions										Certifications	Album
Title	Year	US	R&B/Hip Hop	US Rap	AUS	CAN	GER	IRL	NZ	SWI	UK	Certifications	Album
"Ruff Ryders' Anthem" (DMX)	1998	16	8	7	—	36	—	—	—	—	—	BPI: Silver; RIAA: 2× Platinum	It's Dark and Hell Is Hot
"Banned from T.V." (Noreaga featuring Big Pun, Nature, Cam'ron, Jadakiss, Styles P)	1998	—	—	—	—	—	—	—	—	—	103		N.O.R.E.
"Tear da Roof Off" (Busta Rhymes)	1998	—	75	—	—	—	—	—	—	—	—		Extinction Level Event: The Final World Front
"Money, Cash, Hoes" (Jay-Z featuring DMX)	1999	116	36	19	—	—	—	—	—	—	—		Vol. 2... Hard Knock Life
"Down Bottom" (Drag-On featuring Swizz Beatz and Juvenile)	1999	—	43	5	—	—	—	—	—	—	—		Ryde or Die Vol. 1
"Gotta Man" (Eve)	1999	26	10	8	—	—	—	—	—	—	—		Let There Be Eve...Ruff Ryders' First Lady
"Love Is Blind" (Eve featuring Faith Evans)	1999	34	11	—	—	—	—	—	—	—	—		Let There Be Eve...Ruff Ryders' First Lady
"Memphis Bleek Is..." (Memphis Bleek)	1999	—	93	33	—	—	—	—	—	—	—		Coming of Age
"Jigga My Nigga" (Jay-Z)	1999	28	6	1	—	—	—	—	—	—	—		Ryde or Die Vol. 1 and Vol. 3... Life and Times of S. Carter
"Girl's Best Friend" (Jay-Z featuring Mashonda)	1999	52	19	—	—	—	—	—	—	—	—		Vol. 3... Life and Times of S. Carter
"Things That U Do" (Jay-Z featuring Mariah Carey)	2000	—	120	—	—	—	—	—	—	—	—		Vol. 3... Life and Times of S. Carter
"Party Up (Up in Here)" (DMX)	2000	27	8	11	—	—	—	—	—	—	—	BPI: Silver; RIAA: 2× Platinum	... And Then There Was X
"The Best of Me" (Mýa featuring Jadakiss)	2000	50	14	—	—	—	26	—	—	64	—		Fear of Flying
"Spit These Bars" (Drag-On featuring Swizz Beatz)	2000	—	80	—	—	—	—	—	—	—	—		Opposite of H2O
"WW III" (Ruff Ryders featuring Scarface and Snoop Dogg)	2000	—	—	—	—	—	—	—	—	—	—		Ryde or Die Vol. 2
"Wild Out" (The LOX)	2000	—	64	—	—	—	—	—	—	—	—		We Are the Streets
"Put Your Hands Up" (LL Cool J)	2001	—	—	50	—	—	—	—	—	—	—		Violator: The Album, V2.0
"Wish I Didn't Miss You" (Angie Stone)	2002	79	31	—	7	—	94	—	—	—	30	BPI: Silver	Mahogany Soul
"Guilty" (Swizz Beatz featuring Bounty Killer)	2002	—	104	—	—	—	—	—	—	—	—		Swizz Beatz Presents G.H.E.T.T.O. Stories
"Bigger Business" (Swizz Beatz featuring Ron Isley, Diddy, Birdman, Jadakiss, Snoop Dogg and Cassidy)	2002	—	72	—	—	—	—	—	—	—	—		Swizz Beatz Presents G.H.E.T.T.O. Stories
"Good Times" (Styles P)	2002	22	6	8	—	—	—	—	—	—	—		Swizz Beatz Presents G.H.T.T.O. Stories and A Gangster and a Gentleman
"Get It on the Floor" (DMX featuring Swizz Beatz)	2003	—	57	—	—	—	43	—	—	—	34		Grand Champ
"Snake (Remix)" (R. Kelly featuring Cam'ron and Big Tigger)	2003	—	—	—	—	—	—	—	—	—	—		non-album single
"Bang Bang Boom" (Drag-On featuring Swizz Beatz)	2003	—	94	—	—	—	—	—	—	—	—		Hell and Back
"Hotel" (Cassidy featuring R. Kelly)	2004	4	6	2	25	—	22	16	—	28	3	BPI: Silver	Split Personality
"Get No Better" (Cassidy featuring Mashonda)	2004	79	51	25	—	—	76	21	—	—	24		Split Personality
"Bring Em Out" (T.I.)	2004	9	6	4	—	—	—	—	—	—	59	RIAA: Gold	Urban Legend
"Set It Off" (Young Gunz featuring Swizz Beatz)	2005	—	52	—	—	—	—	—	—	—	—		Brothers from Another
"I'm a Hustla" (Cassidy)	2005	34	8	5	—	—	38	—	—	—	—	RIAA: Platinum	I'm a Hustla
"B-Boy Stance" (Cassidy featuring Swizz Beatz)	2005	—	75	—	—	—	64	—	—	—	—		I'm a Hustla
"Back of da Club" (Mashonda)	2005	—	86	—	—	—	—	—	—	—	—		January Joy
"Blackout" (Mashonda featuring Snoop Dogg)	2005	—	96	—	—	—	—	—	—	—	—		January Joy
"Diamonds on My Neck" (Smitty)	2005	25	—	—	—	—	—	—	—	—	—		non-album single
"Like That" (Memphis Bleek)	2005	113	42	27	—	—	—	—	—	—	—		534
"Check on It" (Beyoncé featuring Slim Thug)	2005	1	1	—	—	5	11	2	1	—	3	BPI: Silver; MC: Gold; RIAA: Platinum; RIANZ: Platinum	#1's
"Untouchable (Swizz Beatz Remix)" (2Pac featuring Krayzie Bone)	2006	—	91	—	—	—	—	—	—	—	—		Pac's Life
"Whuteva" (Remy Ma featuring Swizz Beatz)	2006	—	79	—	—	—	—	—	—	—	—		There's Something About Remy: Based on a True Story
"Touch It" (Busta Rhymes)	2006	16	3	2	14	—	—	—	1	26	6	RIAA: Gold; RIANZ: Gold	The Big Bang
"We in Here" (DMX featuring Swizz Beatz)	2006	—	125	—	—	—	—	—	—	—	—		Year of the Dog... Again
"Spit Your Game" (The Notorious B.I.G. featuring Twista and Krayzie Bone)	2006	—	68	—	—	—	—	47	—	76	64		Duets: The Final Chapter
"Take the Lead (Wanna Ride)" (Bone Thugs-n-Harmony and Wisin & Yandel featuring Melissa Jiménez and Fatman Scoop)	2006	—	—	—	—	—	—	—	—	—	—		Take the Lead (soundtrack)
"Ring the Alarm" (Beyoncé)	2006	11	3	—	—	—	—	—	—	—	—	RIAA: Gold	B'Day
"Upgrade U" (Beyoncé featuring Jay-Z)	2006	59	11	—	—	—	—	—	—	—	176	BPI: Silver	B'Day
"Get Me Bodied" (Beyoncé)	2007	68	10	—	—	—	—	—	—	—	—	ARIA: Gold; RIAA: Platinum	B'Day
"It's Me Bitches" (Swizz Beatz)	2007	83	30	17	—	—	—	—	—	—	—		One Man Band Man
"Tambourine" (Eve)	2007	37	17	10	—	49	78	16	—	—	18		non-album single
"My Drink n My 2 Step" (Cassidy featuring Swizz Beatz)	2007	33	11	6	—	—	—	—	—	—	—		B.A.R.S. The Barry Adrian Reese Story
"Innocent Man (Misunderstood)" (Cassidy featuring Mark Morrison)	2007	—	103	—	—	—	—	—	—	—	—		B.A.R.S. The Barry Adrian Reese Story
"Set It Off" (N.O.R.E. featuring J. Ru$$ and Swizz Beatz)	2007	—	—	—	—	—	—	—	—	—	—		Noreality
"Blow Ya Mind" (Styles P featuring Swizz Beatz)	2007	—	51	19	—	—	—	—	—	—	127		Super Gangster (Extraordinary Gentleman)
"Now That You Got It" (Gwen Stefani featuring Damian Marley)	2007	—	—	—	37	—	73	—	21	—	59		The Sweet Escape
"Give It to You" (Eve featuring Sean Paul)	2007	124	114	—	—	—	49	—	—	—	—		non-album single
"Swing Ya Rag" (T.I. featuring Swizz Beatz)	2008	62	53	29	—	—	—	—	—	—	—		Paper Trail
"Nasty Girl" (Ludacris featuring Plies)	2009	—	54	23	—	—	—	—	—	—	—		Theater of the Mind
"Who's Real" (Jadakiss featuring OJ da Juiceman and Swizz Beatz)	2009	125	39	18	—	—	—	—	—	—	—		The Last Kiss
"Million Bucks" (Maino featuring Swizz Beatz)	2009	—	66	21	—	—	—	—	—	—	—		If Tomorrow Comes...
"I Do" (Lil Jon featuring Snoop Dogg and Swizz Beatz)	2009	—	101	—	—	—	—	—	—	—	—		non-album single
"Million Dollar Bill" (Whitney Houston)	2009	100	16	—	—	62	41	8	—	40	5	BPI: Silver	I Look to You
"I Can Transform Ya" (Chris Brown featuring Lil Wayne and Swizz Beatz)	2009	20	11	—	21	54	—	21	7	—	26	RIAA: 2× Platinum; ARIA: Platinum; BPI: Silver; RMNZ: Platinum	Graffiti
"Looking for Paradise" (Alejandro Sanz featuring Alicia Keys)	2009	104	—	—	—	—	—	—	—	—	—		Paraíso Express
"On to the Next One" (Jay-Z featuring Swizz Beatz)	2009	37	9	5	—	58	—	—	—	—	38		The Blueprint 3
"Put It in a Love Song" (Alicia Keys featuring Beyoncé)	2010	102	60	—	18	71	—	26	24	—	—	ARIA: Gold	The Element of Freedom
"Stranded (Haiti Mon Amour)" (Jay-Z, Bono, The Edge and Rihanna)	2010	16	—	—	—	6	—	3	—	—	41		Hope for Haiti Now
"Stop the Party (Iron Man)" (Busta Rhymes featuring Swizz Beatz)	2010	—	87	—	—	—	—	—	—	—	—		Non-album single
"Fancy" (Drake featuring T.I. and Swizz Beatz)	2010	25	4	1	—	54	—	—	—	—	—	RIAA: Platinum	Thank Me Later
"Gucci Time" (Gucci Mane featuring Swizz Beatz)	2010	—	23	12	—	—	—	—	—	—	—		The Appeal: Georgia's Most Wanted
"Roman's Revenge" (Nicki Minaj featuring Eminem)	2010	56	85	23	—	—	—	—	—	—	125		Pink Friday
"Wait Til You See My Smile" (Alicia Keys)	2010	—	—	—	—	—	—	—	—	—	—		The Element of Freedom
"Ass on the Floor" (Diddy – Dirty Money)	2011	—	80	—	—	—	—	—	—	—	187		Last Train to Paris
"International Party" (Swizz Beatz featuring Alicia Keys)	2011	—	—	—	—	—	—	—	—	—	—		non-album single
"Tip" (The Rangers featuring Swizz Beatz)	2012	—	—	—	—	—	—	—	—	—	—		non-album single
"Hurt Somebody" (Akon featuring French Montana)	2012	—	63	—	—	—	—	—	—	—	—		non-album single
"Everyday Birthday" (Swizz Beatz featuring Ludacris and Chris Brown)	2012	—	44	—	—	—	—	—	—	—	—		non-album single
"New Day" (Alicia Keys)	2013	—	73	—	—	—	—	—	—	—	—		Girl on Fire
"Sweet Serenade" (Pusha T featuring Chris Brown)	2013	119	44	—	—	—	—	—	—	—	—		My Name Is My Name
"Hands Up" (Swizz Beatz featuring Nicki Minaj, Lil Wayne, Rick Ross and 2 Chainz)	2013	—	—	—	—	—	—	—	—	—	—		non-album single
"Soundboy Kill It" (Raekwon featuring Melanie Fiona and Assassin)	2013	—	—	—	—	—	—	—	—	—	—		Fly International Luxurious Art
"We Are Here" (Alicia Keys)	2014	—	—	—	—	—	—	—	—	32	—		non-album single
"Jason" (Jadakiss featuring Swizz Beatz)	2015	—	—	—	—	—	—	—	—	—	—		Top 5 Dead or Alive
"untitled 07 / levitate" (Kendrick Lamar)	2016	90	27	16	—	—	—	—	—	—	93		untitled unmastered.
"AAAHHHH" (Busta Rhymes featuring Swizz Beatz)	2016	—	—	—	—	—	—	—	—	—	—		non-album single
"Pistol on My Side (P.O.M.S.)" (Swizz Beatz featuring Lil Wayne)	2018	—	—	—	—	—	—	—	—	—	—		Poison
"The Weekend" (T.I. featuring Young Thug)	2018	—	—	—	—	—	—	—	—	—	—		Dime Trap
"Uproar" (Lil Wayne)	2018	7	6	6	100	24	—	—	—	—	99	MC: Gold; RIAA: 2× Platinum	Tha Carter V
"Honey, I See You" (Mashonda)	2021	—	—	—	—	—	—	—	—	—	—		Non-album single
"Kant Nobody" (Lil Wayne featuring DMX)	2023	66	23	—	—	—	—	—	—	—	—		I Am Music
"Luxury Life" (Busta Rhymes featuring Coi Leray)	2023	—	—	—	—	—	—	—	—	—	—		Blockbusta
"Talking / Once Again" (Kanye West and Ty Dolla Sign featuring North West)	2024	30	12	—	66	30	—	—	32	69	—		Vultures 1
"—" denotes a recording that did not chart or was not released in that territory.

== 1998 ==
=== The Lox – Money, Power & Respect ===
- 16. "All for the Love"

=== DMX – It's Dark and Hell Is Hot ===
- 02. "Ruff Ryders' Anthem"

=== Busta Rhymes – Extinction Level Event: The Final World Front ===
- 05. "Tear da Roof Off"
- 07. "Just Give It to Me Raw"

=== N.O.R.E. – N.O.R.E ===
- 02. "Banned from T.V." (featuring Cam'ron, Jadakiss, Styles P, Big Pun & Nature)

=== Cam'ron – Confessions of Fire ===
- 02. "Glory" (featuring Noreaga)
- 18. "Shanghai"

=== Jay-Z – Vol. 2... Hard Knock Life ===
- 03. "If I Should Die" (featuring Da Ranjahz)
- 06. "Money, Cash, Hoes" (featuring DMX)
- 08. "Coming of Age (Da Sequel)" [featuring Memphis Bleek]

=== Various Artists - Belly (soundtrack) ===
- 12. "We All Can Get It On" -- Drag-On

=== Flipmode Squad – The Imperial ===
- 04. "Run for Cover"

=== DJ Clue – The Professional ===
- 02. "Ruff Ryders' Anthem (Remix)" -- DMX, Drag-On, Eve, Jadakiss & Styles P

=== DMX – Flesh of My Flesh, Blood of My Blood ===
- 01. "My Niggas" (skit)
- 04. "Ain't No Way"
- 06. "Keep Your Shit the Hardest"
- 08. "It's All Good"
- 09. "The Omen" (featuring Marilyn Manson)
- 11. "No Love for Me" (featuring Drag-On & Swizz Beatz)
- 13. "Blackout" (featuring The L.O.X. & Jay-Z)
- 14. "Flesh of My Flesh, Blood of My Blood"
- 15. "Heat"
- 16. "Prayer II"/"Ready to Meet Him"

== 1999 ==
=== Foxy Brown – Chyna Doll ===
- 05. "Dog and a Fox" (featuring DMX)

=== Various artists – The Corrupter (soundtrack) ===
- 01. "More Money, More Cash, More Hoes" -- Jay-Z with Memphis Bleek & Beanie Sigel

=== Ruff Ryders – Ryde or Die Vol. 1 ===
- 02. "Down Bottom" (Drag-On featuring Juvenile)
- 03. "What Ya Want" (Eve featuring Nokio)
- 04. "Jigga My Nigga (Jay-Z solo) {found too on Vol. 3… Life and Times of S. Carter}
- 08. "Bugout" (DMX solo)
- 09. "Kiss of Death" (Jadakiss solo)
- 10. "The Hood" (featuring Beanie Sigel, Infra-Red, Nuchild, Mysonne, Drag-On)
- 11. "Platinum Plus" (Cross featuring Mase & Jermaine Dupri)
- 13. "Do That Shit" (Eve solo)
- 14. "Pina Colada" (Sheek Louch featuring Big Pun)
- 15. "Some X Shit" (DMX solo)

Leftover

- 00. "The Franklins" (Benzino featuring Busta Rhymes)
- 00. "J.O.S.E." (Jose solo)
- 00. You Know Why (LL Cool J solo)
- 00. "Girls Like That" (Mýa solo)
- 00. "Show Y'all" (Swizz Beatz solo)

=== Various artists – The Wood (soundtrack) ===
- 04. "I Can, I Can" -- Swizz Beatz

=== Memphis Bleek – Coming of Age ===
- 03. "Memphis Bleek Is..."

=== Blackstreet – Girlfriend/Boyfriend Vinyl Maxi Single ===
- 00 "Girlfriend/Boyfriend (The Anthem Remix)" [featuring Sauce Money and 8th Avenue]

=== Various artists – Violator: The Album ===
- 19. "Violators" -- L Boogie, Sonya Blade, Noreaga, Mysonne, Prodigy & Busta Rhymes

=== N.O.R.E. – Melvin Flynt – Da Hustler ===
- 06. "Wethuggedout" (featuring Missy Elliott & Swizz Beatz)

=== Various artists – Blue Streak (soundtrack) ===
- 01. "Girl's Best Friend" -- Jay-Z {found too on Vol. 3… Life and Times of S. Carter}

=== Eve – Let There Be Eve...Ruff Ryders' First Lady ===
- 01. "First Lady" (Intro)
- 02. "Let's Talk About" (featuring Drag-On)
- 03. "Gotta Man"
- 04. "Philly Cheese Steak" (skit)
- 05. "Philly, Philly" (featuring Beanie Sigel)
- 06. "Stuck Up" (featuring C.J.)
- 07. "Ain’t Got No Dough" (featuring Missy Elliott)
- 08. "BM" (skit)
- 09. "Love Is Blind"(featuring Faith Evans)
- 10. "Scenario 2000" (featuring DMX, The LOX & Drag-On)
- 11. "Dog Match" (featuring DMX)
- 12. "My Bitches" (skit)
- 14. "Maniac" (featuring Swizz Beatz)
- 15. "My Enemies" (skit)

=== Jay-Z – Vol. 3… Life and Times of S. Carter ===
- 05. "Things That U Do" (featuring Mariah Carey)
- 15. "Jigga My Nigga" (Bonus Track)
- 15. "Girl's Best Friend" (Bonus Track)

=== DMX – ...And Then There Was X ===
- 02. "One More Road to Cross"
- 07. "Party Up (Up in Here)"
- 12. "Don't You Ever"
- 15. "Comin' for Ya"

== 2000 ==
=== Various artists – Any Given Sunday (soundtrack) ===
- 13. "Move Right Now" -- Swizz Beatz, Drag-On & Eve

=== The LOX – We Are the Streets ===
- 02. "Fuck You"
- 03. "Can I Live"
- 06. "Felony Niggas"
- 07. "Wild Out"
- 08. "Blood Pressure"
- 11. "Y'all Fucked up Now"
- 13. "U Told Me" (featuring Eve)
- 16. "Bring It On"
- 17. "If You Know" (featuring Drag-On, Eve & Swizz Beatz)
- 18. "We Are the Streets"

=== Various artists – Backstage: A Hard Knock Life ===
- 06. "Who Did You Expect" -- The LOX

=== Mýa – Fear of Flying ===
- 01. "Turn it Up (Intro)"
- 06. "The Best of Me" (featuring Jadakiss)
- 19. "Girls Like That" {Bonus Track}

=== Limp Bizkit – Chocolate Starfish and the Hot Dog Flavored Water / The Fast and the Furious (soundtrack) ===
- 14. "Rollin' (Urban Assault Vehicle)" [featuring DMX, Method Man & Redman]

=== Drag-On – Opposite of H2O ===
- 02. "Opposite of H2O" (featuring Jadakiss)
- 06. "Niggas Die 4 Me" (featuring DMX)
- 10. "Get It Right" (featuring DMX)
- 13. "Drag Shit" (featuring Styles P)
- 16. "The Way Life Is"
- 17. "Pop It"
- 18. "What's It All About"
- 19. "Life Goes On"

=== Busta Rhymes – Anarchy ===
- 04. "We Put It Down for Y'all"
- 09. "All Night"

=== Funkmaster Flex – The Mix Tape, Vol. 4: 60 Minutes of Funk ===
- 03. "I Don't Care" -- Jadakiss

=== Eightball & MJG – Space Age 4 Eva ===
- 09. "Boom Boom" (featuring Swizz Beatz)
- 14. "Thank God"

=== Ruff Ryders – Ryde or Die Vol. 2 ===
- 01. "WW III" (Scarface, Snoop Dogg, Yung Wun & Jadakiss)
- 02. "2 Tears in a Bucket" (performed by Sheek Louch, Redman & Method Man)
- 06. "Holiday" (performed by Jadakiss & Styles P)
- 09. "Fright Night" (performed by Swizz Beatz & Busta Rhymes)
- 11. "Twisted Heat" (performed by Twista and Drag-On)

=== Strings – The Black Widow ===
- 02. "Um" (featuring Swizz Beatz)
- 07. "Raise It Up" (featuring Drag-On)
- 08. "Blunt Object"
- 09. "Table Dance"
- 12. "Treason"

== 2001 ==
=== Various artists – Oz (soundtrack) ===
- 14. "Tonight" -- Drag-On

=== Eve – Scorpion ===
- 02. "Cowboy"
- 07. "Got What You Need" (featuring Swizz Beatz & Drag-On)
- 09. "Gangsta Bitches" (featuring Trina & Da Brat)
- 12. "Thug in the Street" (featuring Drag-On & The LOX)

=== Various artists – Violator: The Album, V2.0 ===
- 04. "Put Your Hands Up" -- LL Cool J

=== Various artists – Rush Hour 2 (soundtrack) ===
- 09. “Crazy Girl" -- LL Cool J + Mashonda

=== Tha Eastsidaz – Duces 'n Trayz: The Old Fashioned Way ===
- 20. "Everywhere I Go" (featuring Kokane)

=== Jadakiss – Kiss tha Game Goodbye ===
- 02. "Jada's Got a Gun"
- 12. "On My Way"
- 14. "Kiss Is Spittin'" (featuring Nate Dogg and Mashonda) {co-produced with E. McCaine Edition}
- 15. "Fuckin’ or What?"

=== Damian Marley – Halfway Tree ===
- 15. "Half Way Tree"

=== Angie Stone – Mahogany Soul ===
- 06. "Wish I Didn't Miss You" {co-produced with Andrea Martin & Ivan Matias}

=== Mary J. Blige – No More Drama ===
- 09. "Where I've Been" (featuring Eve)

=== DMX – The Great Depression ===
- 15. "You Could Be Blind" (featuring Mashonda)
- 17. "A Minute for Your Son"

=== Jermaine Dupri – Instructions ===
- 13. "Whatever" (featuring Nate Dogg, R.O.C. & Tigah)
- 15. "Yours and Mine" (featuring Jagged Edge)

=== Ludacris – Word of Mouf ===
- 04. "Cry Babies (Oh No)"

=== Nas - Stillmatic ===
- 11. "Braveheart Party" (featuring Mary J. Blige & Bravehearts) {taken off rereleases}

=== Ruff Ryders – Ryde or Die Vol. 3: In the "R" We Trust ===
- 01. "Intro"
- 09. "Some South Shit" -- Ludacris, Icepick Jay, Fiend & Yung Wun
- 17. "Ruff Ryders All-Star Freestyle" {Bonus Track} -- J-Hood, Shizlansky, Keem, Lock, Rockstar & Cassidy

== 2002 ==
=== Swizz Beatz – G.H.E.T.T.O. Stories ===
- 02. "Ghetto Stories"
- 03. "Big Business" (performed by Jadakiss & Ron Isley)
- 05. "Endalay"(featuring Busta Rhymes)
- 06. "S.H.Y.N.E." (performed by Shyne & Mashonda)
- 07. "Ghetto Love" (performed by Mashonda & LL Cool J)
- 10. "Gone Delirious" (performed by Lil' Kim)
- 11. "N.O.R.E." (performed by N.O.R.E.)
- 12. "Let Me See Ya Do Your Thing" (performed by Birdman & Yung Wun)
- 13. "Island Spice" (performed by Eve)
- 14. "Guilty" (featuring Bounty Killer)
- 15. "Salute Me (Remix)" [performed by Nas, Fat Joe & Cassidy]
- 16. "We Did it Again" (performed by Metallica & Ja Rule) {co-produced with Bob Rock & Metallica}
- 17. "Bigger Business" (performed by Ron Isley, Diddy, Birdman, Jadakiss, Snoop Dogg, Cassidy & TQ)

=== Birdman – Birdman ===
- 19. "Ghetto Life" (featuring TQ, Lil Wayne & Cam'ron)

=== N.O.R.E. – God's Favorite ===
- 05. "Nahmeanuheard"
- 12. "Wanna Be Like Him" (featuring Mashonda)
- 17. "Nahmeanuheard (Remix)" [featuring Fat Joe, Cassidy, Cam'ron & Capone]

=== The Reepz – All Things Come to an End..... ===
- 05. "I Think Not"
- 14. "Ya Dead Now"

=== Eve – Eve-Olution ===
- 05. "Party in the Rain" (featuring Mashonda)
- 13. "Double R What" (featuring Jadakiss & Styles P)

=== Styles P – A Gangster and a Gentleman ===
- 02. "Good Times" {found too on Swizz Beatz Presents G.H.E.T.T.O. Stories}
- 07. "Lick Shots" (featuring Jadakiss, Sheek Louch & J-Hood)
- 08. "And I Came To…" (featuring Eve & Sheek Louch)

=== Busta Rhymes – It Ain't Safe No More... ===
- 15. "Together" (featuring Rah Digga)

=== Nas – God's Son ===
- 17. "The G.O.D." {bonus track}

== 2003 ==
=== Various artists – Biker Boyz: Music from the Motion Picture ===
- 03. "We Did It Again" -- Metallica + Ja Rule
- 05. "Ride Out" -- Swizz Beatz + Cassidy

=== Bravehearts – Bravehearted ===
- 04. "Twilight" (featuring Nas)

=== Lil' Kim – La Bella Mafia ===
- 07. "This Is Who I Am" (featuring Swizz Beatz & Mashonda)

=== Jay-Z – The Blueprint 2.1 ===
- 14. "Stop" {Bonus Track}

=== Bow Wow – Unleashed ===
- 01. "Get It Poppin'"

=== DMX – Grand Champ ===
- 05. "Get It on the Floor" (featuring Swizz Beatz)
- 20. "A'Yo Kato" (featuring Magic & Val)

=== Ruben Studdard – Soulful ===
- 04. "Take the Shot"
- 11. "Don't Quit on Me"

== 2004 ==
=== 404 Soldierz – All Out War ===
- 15. "Walk Like a Soldier"

=== DJ Kay Slay – The Streetsweeper, Vol. 2 - The Pain from the Game ===
- 09. "The Truth" -- LL Cool J

=== Drag-On – Hell and Back ===
- 03. "Bang Bang Boom" (featuring Swizz Beatz)

=== Ivy Queen – Real ===
- 03. "Soldados"

=== Jadakiss – Kiss of Death ===
- 10. "Real Hip-Hop" (featuring Sheek Louch)

=== Jin – The Rest Is History ===
- 03. "Get Your Handz Off" (featuring Swizz Beatz) {co-produced with Neo Da Matrix}
- 19. "Check the Clock" {Bonus Track}

=== Yung Wun – The Dirtiest Thirstiest ===
- 04. "Yung Wun Anthem" {co-produced with Eric McCain}
- 12. "Represent"

=== Shyne – Godfather Buried Alive ===
- 05. "Shyne" (featuring Mashonda)

=== Pitch Black – Pitch Black Law ===
- 02. "Shake That"
- 13. "N.Y.C."

=== Cassidy – Split Personality ===
- 02. "Hotel" (featuring R. Kelly)
- 03. "Lipstick" (featuring Jazze Pha)
- 04. "Get No Better" (featuring Mashonda)
- 05. "Make You Scream" (featuring Snoop Dogg)
- 07. "Tha Problem"
- 08. "Pop That Cannon" (featuring Styles P)
- 13. "Husslin'"
- 16. "Hotel (Vacation Remix)" [featuring R. Kelly & Trina]

=== T.I. – Urban Legend ===
- 13. "Bring 'Em Out"

== 2005 ==
=== Memphis Bleek – 534 ===
- 04. "Like That"

=== Destiny's Child – Number 1's ===
- 05. "Check on It" (Beyoncé featuring Slim Thug & Bun B)

=== Young Gunz – Brothers from Another ===
- 02. "Set It Off"
- 08. "Beef"

=== Cassidy – I'm a Hustla ===
- 02. "I'm a Hustla"
- 05. "B-Boy Stance" (featuring Swizz Beatz)
- 09. "C-Bonics"
- 10. "Bellybutton"
- 15. "I'm a Hustla (Remix)" [featuring Mary J. Blige]

=== Mashonda – January Joy ===
- 03. "Blackout" (featuring Snoop Dogg) {co-produced with Sean Garrett}
- 05. "Back of da Club"
- 10. "Girlfriend"
- 16. "Blackout" (featuring Nas) [Bonus Track] {co-produced with Sean Garrett}

=== Ruff Ryders – The Redemption Vol. 4 ===
- 05. "What They Want" -- Swizz Beatz, Infa.Red & Cross
- 13. "Aim 4 the Head" -- Jin, J-Hood & Cassidy

=== Mariah Carey – The Emancipation of Mimi ===
- 16. "Secret Love" {Japan Bonus Track}

=== Fat Joe – All or Nothing ===
- 07. "Listen Baby" (featuring Mashonda)

=== Cuban Link – Chain Reaction ===
- 04. "Comin' Home With Me" (featuring Avant)
- 13. "Shakedown"
- 14. "Talk About It" (featuring Jadakiss)

=== Smitty ===
- 00. "Diamonds on My Neck"
  - 00. "Diamonds on My Neck (Remix)" [featuring Lil Wayne & Twista]

=== India.Arie – I Am Not My Hair EP ===
- 02. "I Am Not My Hair (Swizz Beatz Remix)" [featuring Swizz Beatz]

=== Don Omar – Da Hitman Presents Reggaetón Latino ===
- 05. "Dale Don Dale (Remix)" [featuring Fabolous]

=== The Notorious B.I.G. – Duets: The Final Chapter ===
- 03. "Spit Your Game" (featuring Twista & Krayzie Bone)

== 2006 ==
=== Papoose – A Threat and a Promise ===
- 05. "Across the Track" (featuring Nas)

=== Remy Martin – There's Something About Remy: Based on a True Story ===
- 05. "Whuteva"

=== Zeebra – The New Beginning ===
- 08. "Let's Get It Started"

=== T.I. – King ===
- 09. "Get It"

=== Various artists – Take the Lead (soundtrack) ===
- 02. "Take the Lead (Wanna Ride)" -- Bone Thugs-n-Harmony and Wisin & Yandel featuring Fatman Scoop, Melissa Jiménez & Drag-On

=== Ice Cube – Laugh Now, Cry Later ===
- 09. "Stop Snitchin'"

=== Monica - The Makings of Me ===
- 07. "Raw" {co-produced by Harold Lilly}

=== Busta Rhymes – The Big Bang ===
- 02. "Touch It"

=== Tha Dogg Pound – Cali Iz Active ===
- 03. "Sittin' on 23z"

=== DMX – Year of the Dog... Again ===
- 02. "We in Here (featuring Swizz Beatz)
- 03. "I Run Shit" (featuring Big Stan)
- 04. "Come Thru (Move)" [featuring Busta Rhymes & Swizz Beatz]
- 06. "Baby Motha" (featuring Janyce)

=== Beyoncé – B'Day ===
- 02. "Get Me Bodied" {co-produced by Sean Garrett}
- 04. "Upgrade U" (featuring Jay-Z) {co-produced by Cameron Wallace}
- 05. "Ring the Alarm"
- 12. "Lost Yo Mind" (Pre-order Bonus Track)

=== JoJo – The High Road ===
- 02. "The Way You Do Me" {co-produced by Sean Garrett}

=== The Game – Doctor's Advocate ===
- 09. "Scream on 'Em"

=== 2Pac – Pac's Life ===
- 01. "Untouchable (Swizz Beatz Remix)" [featuring Krayzie Bone]

=== Jay-Z – Kingdom Come ===
- 12. "Dig a Hole" (featuring Sterling Simms)

=== Gwen Stefani – The Sweet Escape ===
- 05. "Now That You Got It" {co-produced by Sean Garrett}

=== Fantasia – Fantasia ===
- 11. "Surround U"

=== DJ Clue – The Professional 3 ===
- 16. "Ugly (Thug It Out)" -- Jadakiss & Swizz Beatz

== 2007 ==
=== Snoop Dogg – Unreleased Heatrocks ===
- 12. "Got My Own" (featuring Swizz Beatz)

=== Eve – Here I Am (shelved) ===
- 00. "Tambourine"
- 00. "Give It to You" (featuring Sean Paul)

=== Bone Thugs-n-Harmony – Strength & Loyalty ===
- 11. "Candy Paint" (featuring Swizz Beatz & Autumn Rowe)

=== UGK – Underground Kingz ===
- 16. "Hit the Block" (featuring T.I.) {Bonus Track}

=== Swizz Beatz – One Man Band Man ===
- 02. "It's Me Bitches"
- 07. "Take a Picture"
- 08. "Top Down" {co-produced with The "E. McCaine" Edition}
- 10. "Part of the Plan"
- 12. "It's Me...(Remix)" [featuring Lil Wayne, R. Kelly & Jadakiss]

=== N.O.R.E. – Noreality ===
- 01. "Set It Off" (featuring Swizz Beatz & J-Ru$$)

=== Chris Brown – Exclusive ===
- 13. "I'll Call Ya"

=== Cassidy – B.A.R.S. The Barry Adrian Reese Story ===
- 02. "My Drink n My 2 Step" (featuring Swizz Beatz) {co-produced with The Individualz}
- 06. "Innocent Man (Misunderstood)" {co-produced with The Individualz}
- 08. "Leanin' on the Lord" (featuring Angie Stone)
- 12. "Take a Trip" (featuring Mashonda)

=== Alicia Keys – As I Am ===
- 15. "Waiting for Your Love" (iTunes Bonus Track)
- 00. "Teenage Love Affair (Remix)" [featuring LL Cool J]

=== Styles P – Super Gangster (Extraordinary Gentleman) ===
- 02. "Blow Ya Mind" (featuring Swizz Beatz)

=== Bow Wow & Omarion ===
- "Girlfriend (Remix)" (featuring Cassidy & Soulja Boy Tell 'Em) {co-produced with The Individualz}

== 2008 ==
=== Various artists – Grand Theft Auto IV soundtrack ===
- 00. "Blow Ya Mind (Remix)" [Styles P featuring Swizz Beatz & The LOX]

=== Layzie Bone – Thugz Nation ===
- 04. "Toast 2 That" (featuring Wish Bone, Krayzie Bone & Swizz Beatz)

=== Fat Joe – The Elephant in the Room ===
- 06. "Drop" (featuring Jackie Rubio & Swizz Beatz)

=== Mariah Carey – E=MC² ===
- 11. "O.O.C."

=== Estelle – Shine ===
- 12. "Shine"

=== Elephant Man – Let's Get Physical ===
- 06. "Jump"
- 12. "Who Wanna" (featuring Swizz Beatz)
- 13. "Five-O (Remix)" ([featuring Swizz Beatz, Wyclef Jean, Assassin, Yung Joc & Diddy]

=== Bang Bang Boogie - The Machine, Vol. 1 ===
- 21. "High Blood Pressure"
- 22. "Bang Out"

=== Lil Wayne – Tha Carter III ===
- 06. "Dr. Carter"

=== G-Unit – T·O·S (Terminate on Sight) ===
- 13. "Get Down"

=== Daz Dillinger – Only on the Left Side ===
- 02. "I'm from the Hood" (featuring Swizz Beatz)

=== Ice Cube – Raw Footage ===
- 19. "Don't Make Me Hurt Ya Feelings" (Best Buy pre-order)

=== Bow Wow – Half Man, Half Dog Vol. 1 ===
- 02. "Big Bank" (featuring Swizz Beatz) (co-produced with The Individualz)

=== T.I. – Paper Trail ===
- 10. "Swing Ya Rag" (featuring Swizz Beatz)

=== Ludacris – Theater of the Mind ===
- 09. "Nasty Girl" (featuring Plies)

=== Maroon 5 – Call and Response: The Remix Album ===
- 01. "If I Never See Your Face Again (Swizz Beatz Remix)"

== 2009 ==
=== Jamie Jones – Celebrity Music ===
- 02. "Whatever"
- 03. "Ayo"

=== Lil Jon ===
00. "I Do" (featuring Swizz Beatz & Snoop Dogg)

=== Bow Wow – New Jack City II ===
- 11. "Shake It" (featuring Swizz Beatz)
- 13. "Big Girls" (featuring Yung Joc) [Wal-Mart Deluxe Edition Bonus Track] {co-produced by Raj for The EntouRAJ}

=== Jadakiss – The Last Kiss ===
- 03. "Who's Real" (featuring OJ da Juiceman & Swizz Beatz)

=== Maino – If Tomorrow Comes ===
- 01. "Million Bucks" (featuring Swizz Beatz)

=== Whitney Houston – I Look to You ===
- 01. "Million Dollar Bill" (co-produced with Alicia Keys)

=== Jay-Z – The Blueprint 3 ===
- 07. "On to the Next One" (featuring Swizz Beatz)

=== Fat Joe – Jealous Ones Still Envy 2 (J.O.S.E. 2) ===
- 11. "Blackout" (featuring Swizz Beatz & Rob Cash of KAR)

=== Tha Dogg Pound – That Was Then, This Is Now ===
- 02. "Attitude Problem" (featuring Swizz Beatz & Cassidy)

=== Chris Brown – Graffiti ===
- 01. "I Can Transform Ya" (featuring Swizz Beatz & Lil Wayne)

=== Alicia Keys – The Element of Freedom ===
- 05. "Wait Til You See My Smile" (co-produced with Jeff Bhasker)
- 10. "Put It in a Love Song" (featuring Beyoncé)
- 17. "Almost There" (Empire Edition)

== 2010 ==
=== Various artists – Hope for Haiti Now ===
- 17. "Stranded (Haiti Mon Amour)" - Jay-Z with Bono, The Edge & Rihanna

=== Cassidy – Face 2 Face EP ===
- 04. "Henni & Bacardi"

=== T.I. – Fuck a Mixtape ===
- 03. "Spazz Out"

=== Busta Rhymes ===
- "Stop the Party (Iron Man)" [featuring Swizz Beatz]
- "Stop the Party (Remix)" [featuring Swizz Beatz, T.I., Cam'ron, Ghostface Killah & DMX]

=== Ludacris – Battle of the Sexes ===
- 13. "Tell Me a Secret" (featuring Ne-Yo)

=== Drake – Thank Me Later ===
- 07. "Fancy" (featuring T.I. & Swizz Beatz) {co-produced with 40}

=== Trey Songz – Passion, Pain & Pleasure ===
- 19. "I Like Dat" (featuring Swizz Beatz & T.I.) {Bonus Track}

=== Gucci Mane – The Appeal: Georgia's Most Wanted ===
- 06. "Gucci Time" (featuring Swizz Beatz)
- 10. "It's Alive" (featuring Swizz Beatz)

=== Nicki Minaj – Pink Friday ===
- 02. "Roman's Revenge" (featuring Eminem)
- 10. "Here I Am"
- 17. "Wave Ya Hand" (Bonus Track)
- 18. "Catch Me" (Bonus Track)

=== Diddy – Dirty Money – Last Train to Paris ===
- 02. "Ass on the Floor" (featuring Swizz Beatz)

=== Kanye West – GOOD Friday Series ===
- 00. "Power (Remix)" [featuring Jay-Z & Swizz Beatz] {co-Produced by S1 & Kanye West}

== 2011 ==
=== Swizz Beatz – Monster Mondays Vol. 1 ===
- 01. "DJ Play that Beat" (featuring Estelle)
- 02. "Bang Bang" (featuring Pusha T & Pharrell)
- 03. "King Tut" (featuring Rakim) (co-produced with The Individualz)
- 04. "Y'all Don't Really Know" (performed by DMX & Busta Rhymes)
- 05. "Bad One" (featuring Busta Rhymes)
- 06. "Ass on the Floor" (Diddy – Dirty Money featuring Swizz Beatz)
- 07. "Hot Steppa #1" (featuring Eve)
- 08. "We Keep It Rockin’" (featuring Maino, Jadakiss, Jim Jones & Joell Ortiz)
- 09. "Hustle Hard" (featuring Ace Hood)
- 10. "Speechless" (Alicia Keys featuring Eve)
- 11. "The Transporter" (performed by Rick Ross)
- 12. "Freaky I Iz" (Kevin McCall featuring Diesel & Chris Brown)
- 13. "Anything" (performed by Musiq Soulchild)
- 14. "Change Is Gonna Come" (performed by DMX)
- 15. "Time to Get Paid" (performed by DMX)
- 16. "Love" (performed by Colin Smith)
- 17. "Top Down Nas Edition" (performed by Nas) (co-produced with The "E. McCaine" Edition) (From the Swizz Throwback Vault)
- 18. "Co-Pilot" (featuring Snoop Dogg & JR Reid)
- 19. "Freaky" (performed by Jadakiss, Akon, Murda Mook & Shella)
- 20. "Ready Ready" (Sean Cross featuring Swizz Beatz)
- 21. "Man Down (Rihanna Remix)" (Eve featuring Rihanna)
- 22. "Live From Paris (MGMT Freestyle)"
- 23. "We Workin'" (performed by Bone Thugs-n-Harmony) (From the Swizz Throwback Vault)
- 24. "Earthquake" (Swizz Beatz & DJ Semtex present Dot Rotten)
- 25. "Catch Me" (Nicki Minaj featuring Swizz Beatz)
- 26. "Reebok Back" (featuring Rick Ross & Meek Mill)
- 27. "My Hood" (performed by Jim Jones, Juelz Santana & Cassidy) (From the Swizz Throwback Vault)
- 28. "Dear Anne" (performed by Lil Wayne)

=== Swizz Beatz ===
- 00. "Bonkers"
- 00. "International Party" (featuring Alicia Keys)

=== Maino – Keep It Rockin EP ===
01. "We Keep It Rockin" (featuring Swiz Beatz, Jadakiss, Jim Jones & Joell Ortiz)

=== Bushido – Jenseits von Gut und Böse ===
- 07. "Mo'Fucka" (featuring Swizz Beatz)

=== Verbal – Visionair ===
- 04. "Ball n Bounce"

=== Jennifer Hudson – I Remember Me ===
- 04. "Angel" {co-produced with Alicia Keys}
- 07. "Everybody Needs Love" {co-produced with Alicia Keys}

=== Jay-Z & Kanye West – Watch the Throne ===
- 08. "Welcome to the Jungle"
- 10. "Murder to Excellence" {co-produced with S1}

=== Glasses Malone - Beach Cruiser ===
- 16. "Stronger" (iTunes Store Bonus Track)

=== Mateo – Love & Stadiums II ===
- 01. "Say It's So" (featuring Alicia Keys)

== 2012 ==
=== Josh Xantus – Everybody Hates Josh X ===
- 12. "Movie Star"

=== Nas – Life Is Good ===
- 08. "Summer on Smash" (featuring Miguel & Swizz Beatz)

=== DMX – Undisputed ===
- 02. "What They Don't Know"
- 14. "Ya'll Don't Really Know"

=== Alicia Keys – Girl on Fire ===
- 05. "New Day" {co-produced with Dr. Dre}

=== French Montana – Mac & Cheese 3 ===
- 14. "Diamonds" (featuring J. Cole & Rick Ross)

=== The Rangers ===
- 00. "Tip"

=== The LOX ===
- 00. "Grand Wizard" (featuring Swizz Beatz)

== 2013 ==
=== Funkmaster Flex – Who You Mad At? Me or Yourself? ===
- 15. "Get It In" (Ne-Yo featuring Swizz Beatz)

=== Eve – Lip Lock ===
- 07. "Mama in the Kitchen" (featuring Snoop Dogg)

=== Jay-Z – Magna Carta... Holy Grail ===
- 10. "Versus" {co-produced with Timbaland}
- 17. "Open Letter" (Bonus Track) {co-produced with Timbaland}

=== Pusha T – My Name Is My Name ===
- 03. "Sweet Serenade" (featuring Chris Brown) {additional production by Kanye West}

== 2014 ==
=== DJ Kay Slay – The Last Hip Hop Disciple ===
- 02. "Real Hip Hop" (featuring Papoose, Vado and Ransom)

=== Reek da Villian ===
- 00. "Go Off" (featuring Kendrick Lamar, Ace Hood and Swizz Beatz)

=== French Montana ===
- 00. "Megadeath" (featuring Swizz Beatz, Remy Ma & Jadakiss)

== 2015 ==
=== DMX – Redemption of the Beast ===
- 10. "56 Bars"

=== Raekwon – Fly International Luxurious Art ===
- 09. "Soundboy Kill It" (featuring Melanie Fiona and Assassin)

=== French Montana – Casino Life 2 ===
- 04. "I Ain't Gonna Lie" (featuring Lil Wayne)

=== Empire Cast – The Complete Season 2 ===
- 02. "Born to Lose" (Jussie Smollett, Yazz and Sean Cross)
- 32. "Ready to Go" (Jussie Smollett)

=== Jadakiss – Top 5 Dead or Alive ===
- 03. "You Don't Eat" (featuring Puff Daddy) {co-produced with Avenue Beatz}
- 06. "Jason" (featuring Swizz Beatz) {co-produced with Batson}

== 2016 ==
=== Kendrick Lamar – Untitled Unmastered ===
- 07. "Untitled 07 – 2014–2016" {co-produced with Egypt Dean, Cardo & Frank Dukes}

=== Kanye West – The Life of Pablo ===
- 01. "Ultralight Beam" (featuring Chance the Rapper and Kirk Franklin) {co-produced with Kanye, Mike Dean & Chance the Rapper}

=== N.O.R.E. - Drunk Uncle ===
- 06. "Get Money" (feat. Noah)

=== Schoolboy Q – Blank Face LP ===
- 02. "Lord Have Mercy"

=== Snoop Dogg – Coolaid ===
- 06. "Let Me See Em Up" {co-produced with Avenue Beatz & MusicMan Ty}
- 13. "Light It Up" {co-produced with Avenue Beatz & MusicMan Ty}
- 14. "Side Piece" {co-produced with Avenue Beatz & MusicMan Ty}
- 18. "Let the Beat Drop (Celebrate)" {co-produced with Snagg & MusicMan Ty}

=== Alicia Keys – Here ===
- 02. "The Gospel" {co-produced with Alicia Keys and Mark Batson}
- 03. "Pawn It All" {co-produced with Alicia Keys and Mark Batson}
- 06. "She Don't Really Care / 1 Luv" {co-produced with Alicia Keys and Mark Batson}
- 08. "Illusion of Bliss" {co-produced with Alicia Keys and Mark Batson}

== 2017 ==
=== Tate Kobang – Tate Ko ===
- 03. "Ello?" (featuring Swizz Beatz)

=== DMX ===
- 00. "Bain Iz Back"

=== Busta Rhymes ===
- 00. "AAAHHHH!!!"

=== Romeo Santos – Golden ===
- 04. "Premio"

=== Fabolous & Jadakiss – Friday on Elm Street ===
- 03. "Theme Music" (featuring Swizz Beatz)

== 2018 ==
=== Jussie Smollett – Sum of My Music ===
- 02. "Catch Your Eye" (featuring Swizz Beatz)
- 06. "Staycation"
- 10. "I Know My Name"

=== N.O.R.E. – 5E ===
- 10. "Parade" (featuring Kent Jones and Yung Reallie)

=== Lil Wayne – Tha Carter V ===
- 04. "Uproar" {co-produced with Avenue Beatz}

=== T.I. – Dime Trap ===
- 05. "The Weekend" (featuring Young Thug)

=== Swizz Beatz – Poison ===
- 01. "Poison Intro" (featuring Áine Zion)
- 02. "Pistol On My Side (P.O.M.S.)" [featuring Lil Wayne] {co-produced with AraabMuzik
- 07. ”Cold Blooded" (featuring Pusha-T)
- 10. "Swizz Montana" (featuring French Montana) {co-produced with Avenue Beatz}

Leftovers

- "Everyday (Coolin')" (featuring Eve)
- "V.I.P. Chillin'" (featuring Dr. Dre & Sean Cross)
- "The Visuals"
- "Rock'n'Roll" (featuring Lenny Kravitz, Lil Wayne and Travis Barker)
- "Skyscrapers" (featuring Bono and Kanye West)
- "It's You" (featuring Mary J. Blige)
- "Show Off" (featuring Alexandra Burke; produced by Swizz Beatz)
- "Dance Like a White Girl"
- "International Party" (featuring Alicia Keys)
- "You Stay on My Mind"
- "Hands Up" (featuring Lil Wayne, Rick Ross, Nicki Minaj & 2 Chainz)

== 2019 ==
=== Giggs - Big Bad ===
- 18. "Terminator"

=== Nas – The Lost Tapes II ===
- 01. "No Bad Energy”
- 08. "Adult Film" (featuring Swizz Beatz)

=== The Game – Born 2 Rap ===
- 10. “Gucci Flip Flops”

=== Snoop Dogg – I Wanna Thank Me ===
- 05. "Countdown" (featuring Swizz Beatz)
- 14. "Rise to the Top" (featuring Swizz Beatz and Trey Songz)

=== Dave East – Survival ===
- 01. "They Wanna Kill You" (featuring DJ Premier)

== 2020 ==
=== Jay Electronica - A Written Testimony ===
- 03. "The Blinding" (featuring Jay-Z & Travis Scott) {co-produced with AraabMuzik & Hit-Boy}

=== 4-IZE - Look Into My Ize ===
- 11. "Pedestal" (featuring Shawnna and Alexander Blane)

=== Joey Bada$$ - The Light Pack ===
- 02. "No Explanation" (featuring Pusha T) {co-produced with Sean C & LV}

=== The Lox - Living Off Xperience ===
- 01. "Gave It to Em" {co-produced with AraabMuzik}

=== Busta Rhymes - Extinction Level Event 2: The Wrath of God ===
- 02. "The Purge" {co-produced with Avenue}

== 2021 ==
=== Various artists - Godfather of Harlem (soundtrack) ===
- 00. "No Bark When I Bite" -- Rick Ross + Cruel Youth

=== Pop Smoke - Faith ===
- 18. "8-Ball" (featuring Kid Cudi) {Co-produced with MusicMan Ty & Avenue Beats}

=== Papoose – June ===
- 01. "Combative Soldiers"
- 04. "Production Murder"

=== Kanye West – Donda ===
- 17. "Jesus Lord" (featuring Jay Electronica and Larry Hoover Jr.) {co-produced by Kanye & Gesaffelstein}
- 27. "Jesus Lord, Pt. 2" (featuring Jay Electronica, The Lox, and Larry Hoover Jr.) {co-produced by Kanye & Gesaffelstein}

== 2022 ==
=== Mary J. Blige – Good Morning Gorgeous ===
- 14. "Runnin'" (featuring Ne-Yo) {co-produced by Jerry Wonda}

=== Game – Drillmatic – Heart vs. Mind ===
- 22. "Money Cash Clothes" (featuring ASAP Rocky)

=== Westside Gunn – 10 ===
- 08. "Science Class" (featuring Stove God Cooks, Busta Rhymes, Raekwon, and Ghostface Killah)

=== Busta Rhymes – The Fuse Is Lit EP ===
- 03. "Break This Bitch Up"

=== Tia Lee – ? ===
- 00. "Goodbye Princess" (produced with MusicMan Ty, Chachi)

=== $kinny ===
- 00. "Salam" (feat. French Montana & Swizz Beats)

== 2023 ==
=== Lil Wayne – I Am Music ===
- 01. "Kant Nobody" (featuring DMX) {co-produced with Avenue Beats}

=== Swizz Beats - Hip Hop 50: Volume 2 ===
- Whole EP

=== Busta Rhymes — Blockbusta ===
Also co-executive producer

- 06. "Luxury Life" (featuring Coi Leray)
- 10. "The Return of Mansa Musa" (featuring Swizz Beatz and Blackway)

== 2024 ==
=== ¥$ (Kanye West and Ty Dolla Sign) – Vultures 1 ===
- 04. "Talking / Once Again" (featuring North West)
- 08. "Paperwork" (featuring Quavo)

=== Kith & Cam'Ron ===
- 00. "Last Stop"

=== Conway the Machine - Slant Face Killer ===
- 09. "Ninja Man" (featuring Swizz Beatz)

=== Beyoncé – Cowboy Carter ===
- 12. "Spaghettii" (with Linda Martell and Shaboozey) {co-produced by Beyoncé and Khirye Tyler}

== 2025 ==
=== Xzibit - Kingmaker ===
- Leave Me Alone (feat. Ty$ & Dr. Dre) {produced with Dr. Dre}

=== Scarlip - Scarred B4 ===
- Pop That (feat. Lil Wayne) {produced with Rockwilder}

=== Raekwon - The Emperor's New Clothes ===
- 600 School (feat. Ghostface Killah & Method Man)
