= Swizz Beatz discography =

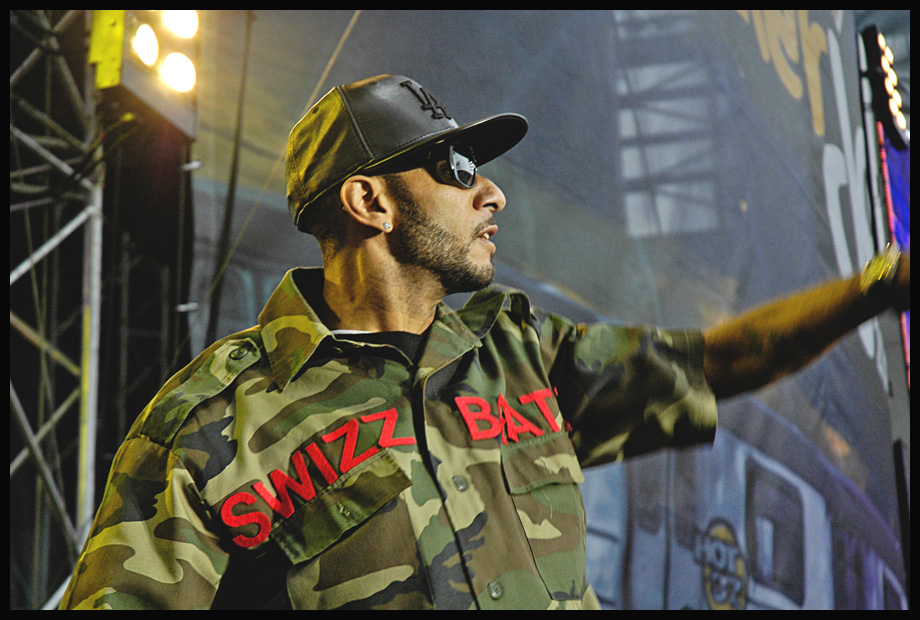
- Swizz Beatz performing at Hot 97's Summer Jam 2007
- Studio albums: 2
- Extended plays: 1
- Soundtrack albums: 8
- Compilation albums: 1
- Singles: 6
- Music videos: 6

American producer and rapper Swizz Beatz has released two studio albums, one compilation album, one extended play (EP), one mixtape, thirty-nine singles (including thirty-one as a featured artist), three promotional singles and thirty-three music videos.

== Albums ==
=== Studio albums ===
List of albums, with selected chart positions
Title	Album details	Peak chart positions			
Title	Album details	US	US R&B	US Rap	CAN
One Man Band Man	Released: August 21, 2007; Label: Full Surface, Universal Motown; Format: CD, digital download	7	1	1	92
Poison	Released: November 2, 2018; Label: Epic; Format: CD, digital download	73	39	—	—
"—" denotes a recording that did not chart or was not released in that territory.

=== Compilation albums ===
List of albums, with selected chart positions
Title	Album details	Peak chart positions	
Title	Album details	US	US R&B
Swizz Beatz Presents G.H.E.T.T.O. Stories	Released: December 10, 2002; Label: Full Surface, DreamWorks; Format: CD, LP, cassette, digital download	50	10

== Extended plays ==
List of extended plays, with year released
Title	Album details
Hip Hop 50: Vol. 2	Released: April 21, 2023; Label: Mass Appeal; Format: Digital download

== Mixtapes ==
List of mixtapes, with year released
Title	Album details
Monster Mondays Vol. 1	Released: July 12, 2011; Label: Self-released; Format: Digital download

== Singles ==
=== As lead artist ===
List of singles as lead artist, with selected chart positions, showing year released and album name
Title	Year	Peak chart positions			Album
Title	Year	US	US R&B	US Rap	Album
"Guilty" (featuring Bounty Killer)	2002	—	104	—	Swizz Beatz Presents G.H.E.T.T.O. Stories
"Bigger Business" (featuring Birdman, Jadakiss, P. Diddy, Snoop Dogg, Ronald Isley, Cassidy and TQ)	2002	—	72	—	Swizz Beatz Presents G.H.E.T.T.O. Stories
"Come and Get Me" (featuring Cassidy)	2007	—	—	—	non-album single
"It's Me Bitches"	2007	83	30	17	One Man Band Man
"Money in the Bank"	2007	84	22	14	One Man Band Man
"Top Down"	2007	—	—	—	One Man Band Man
"Stand Up (The Sean Bell Tribute Song)" (with Cassidy, Maino, Styles P, Talib Kweli and Drag-On)	2008	—	—	—	non-album singles
"Everyday (Coolin')" (featuring Eve)	2011	—	81	—	non-album singles
"International Party" (featuring Alicia Keys)	2011	—	—	—	non-album singles
"Street Knock" (with A$AP Rocky)	2012	—	—	—	non-album singles
"Everyday Birthday" (featuring Chris Brown and Ludacris)	2012	—	44	—	non-album singles
"Hands Up" (featuring Nicki Minaj, Lil Wayne, Rick Ross and 2 Chainz)	2013	—	—	—	non-album singles
"Waitin On Me"	2016	—	—	—	non-album singles
"Represent Tonight"	2016	—	—	—	non-album singles
"Work It" (with Soccradz da Don)	2017	—	—	—	non-album singles
"It's Okayyy"	2018	—	—	—	non-album singles
"Pistol on My Side (P.O.M.S.)" (featuring Lil Wayne)	2018	—	—	—	Poison
"25 Soldiers" (featuring Young Thug and Teddy Sinclair)	2018	—	—	—	Poison
"Come Again" (featuring Giggs)	2018	—	—	—	Poison
"Red People" (with The Game, YG & Timbaland)	2026	—	—	—	Non-album single
"—" denotes a recording that did not chart or was not released in that territory.

=== As featured artist ===
List of singles as featured artist, with selected chart positions, showing year released and album name
Title	Year	Peak chart positions			Certifications	Album
Title	Year	US	US R&B	US Rap	Certifications	Album
"Spit These Bars" (Drag-On featuring Swizz Beatz)	2000	—	80	—		Opposite of H2O
"Get It on the Floor" (DMX featuring Swizz Beatz)	2003	—	57	—		Grand Champ
"Bang Bang Boom" (Drag-On featuring Swizz Beatz)	2004	—	94	—		Hell and Back
"Set It Off" (Young Gunz featuring Swizz Beatz)	2005	—	52	—		Brothers from Another
"Like That" (Memphis Bleek featuring Swizz Beatz)	2005	—	47	22		534
"B-Boy Stance" (Cassidy featuring Swizz Beatz)	2005	—	75	—		I'm a Hustla
"Whuteva" (Remy Ma featuring Swizz Beatz)	2006	—	79	—		There's Something About Remy: Based on a True Story
"We in Here" (DMX featuring Swizz Beatz)	2006	—	125	—		Year of the Dog...Again
"New York Shit" (Busta Rhymes featuring Swizz Beatz)	2006	—	77	—		The Big Bang
"My Drink N My 2 Step" (Cassidy featuring Swizz Beatz)	2007	35	11	6		B.A.R.S. The Barry Adrian Reese Story
"C'mon Baby" (Saigon featuring Swizz Beatz)	2007	—	—	—		The Greatest Story Never Told
"Set It Off" (N.O.R.E. featuring Swizz Beatz and J. Russ)	2007	—	—	—		Noreality
"Watch Ya Mouth" (Busta Rhymes featuring Swizz Beatz)	2007	—	—	—		non-album single
"Blow Ya Mind" (Styles P featuring Swizz Beatz)	2007	—	51	19		Super Gangster, Extraordinary Gentleman
"Swing Ya Rag" (T.I. featuring Swizz Beatz)	2008	62	53	—		Paper Trail
"Who's Real" (Jadakiss featuring Swizz Beatz and OJ da Juiceman)	2009	125	39	18		The Last Kiss
"Million Bucks" (Maino featuring Swizz Beatz)	2009	—	66	21		If Tomorrow Comes...
"I Do" (Lil Jon featuring Snoop Dogg and Swizz Beatz)	2009	—	101	—		non-album single
"I Can Transform Ya" (Chris Brown featuring Lil Wayne and Swizz Beatz)	2009	20	11	—	RIAA: 2× Platinum	Graffiti
"On to the Next One" (Jay-Z featuring Swizz Beatz)	2009	37	9	5	RIAA: Platinum	The Blueprint 3
"We Are the World 25 for Haiti" (with Artists for Haiti)	2010	2	—	—		non-album singles
"Stop the Party (Iron Man)" (Busta Rhymes featuring Swizz Beatz)	2010	—	87	—		non-album singles
"Fancy" (Drake featuring T.I. and Swizz Beatz)	2010	25	4	1	RIAA: Platinum	Thank Me Later
"Red Dot Special (Rha-Ta-Ta-Ta)" (Spragga Benz featuring Swizz Beatz, Shabba Ranks, and Kardinal Offishall)	2010	—	—	—		Shotta Culture
"Gucci Time" (Gucci Mane featuring Swizz Beatz)	2010	104	23	12		The Appeal: Georgia's Most Wanted
"Start It Up" (Lloyd Banks featuring Kanye West, Swizz Beatz, Fabolous, and Ryan Leslie)	2010	105	52	20		H.F.M. 2 (Hunger for More 2)
"Ass on the Floor" (Diddy – Dirty Money featuring Swizz Beatz)	2010	—	80	—		Last Train to Paris
"Can a Drummer Get Some?" (Travis Barker featuring Lil Wayne, Rick Ross, Swizz Beatz, and Game)	2011	—	—	—		Give the Drummer Some
"Anything" (Musiq Soulchild featuring Swizz Beatz)	2011	—	31	—		MusiqInTheMagiq
"Throw It Away" (Slaughterhouse featuring Swizz Beatz)	2012	—	—	—		Welcome to: Our House
"Tip" (The Rangers featuring Swizz Beatz)	2012	—	—	—		non-album singles
"All We Know" (DJ Absolut featuring Ace Hood, Ray J, Swizz Beatz, Bow Wow, and Fat Joe)	2013	—	—	—		non-album singles
"Jason" (Jadakiss featuring Swizz Beatz)	2015	—	—	—		Top 5 Dead or Alive
"Famous" (Kanye West featuring Rihanna and Swizz Beatz)	2016	34	43	—	RIAA: 2× Platinum	The Life of Pablo
"AAAHHHH" (Busta Rhymes featuring Swizz Beatz)	2016	—	—	—		non-album single
"The Half" (DJ Snake featuring Swizz Beatz, Jeremih, and Young Thug)	2017	—	—	—		Encore
"Uproar" (Lil Wayne featuring Swizz Beatz)	2018	7	6	6	RIAA: 2× Platinum	Tha Carter V
"Big Tyme" (Rick Ross featuring Swizz Beatz)	2019	119	—	—		Port of Miami 2
"Good Morning" (Black Thought featuring Pusha T, Swizz Beatz, and Killer Mike)	2020	—	—	—		Streams of Thought, Vol. 3: Cain & Abel
"—" denotes a recording that did not chart or was not released in that territory.

=== Promotional singles ===
List of promotional singles, with selected chart positions, showing year released and album name
Title	Year	Peak chart positions			Album
Title	Year	US	US R&B	US Rap	Album
"Return of the Hustle" (Fabolous featuring Swizz Beatz)	2007	—	122	—	From Nothin' to Somethin'
"All I Do Is Win (Remix)" (DJ Khaled featuring T-Pain, Diddy, Nicki Minaj, Rick Ross, Busta Rhymes, Fabolous, Jadakiss, Fat Joe, and Swizz Beatz)	2010	—	—	—	non-album singles
"Ima Boss (Remix)" (Meek Mill featuring DJ Khaled, T.I., Rick Ross, Lil Wayne, Birdman, and Swizz Beatz)	2012	51	—	—	non-album singles
"—" denotes a recording that did not chart or was not released in that territory.

== Other charted songs ==
List of songs, with selected chart positions, showing year released and album name
Title	Year	Peak chart positions	Certifications	Album
Title	Year	US R&B	Certifications	Album
"So Appalled" (Kanye West featuring Jay-Z, Pusha T, Cyhi the Prynce, Swizz Beatz, and RZA)	2010	114	RIAA: Gold	My Beautiful Dark Twisted Fantasy
"Don't Shoot" (The Game featuring Rick Ross, 2 Chainz, Diddy, Fabolous, Wale, DJ Khaled, Swizz Beatz, Yo Gotti, Currensy, Problem, King Pharaoh, and TGT)	2014	53		non-album single

== Guest appearances ==
List of non-single guest appearances, with other performing artists, showing year released and album name
Title	Year	Other artist(s)	Album
"Keep Your Shit the Hardest"	1998	DMX	Flesh of My Flesh, Blood of My Blood
"No Love 4 Me"	1998	DMX, Drag-On	Flesh of My Flesh, Blood of My Blood
"Maniac"	1999	Eve	Let There Be Eve...Ruff Ryders' First Lady
"Move Right Now"	2000	Eve, Drag-On	Any Given Sunday soundtrack
"If You Know"	2000	The LOX, Drag-On, Eve	We Are the Streets
"Boom Boom"	2000	8Ball & MJG	Space Age 4 Eva
"On My Way"	2001	Jadakiss	Kiss tha Game Goodbye
"Get Your Handz Off"	2004	Jin	The Rest Is History
"Bellybutton"	2005	Cassidy	I'm a Hustla
"Get 'Em"	2005	Cassidy	I'm a Hustla
"Brown Paper Bag"	2006	Birdman, Lil Wayne	Like Father, Like Son
"Scream on 'Em"	2006	The Game	Doctor's Advocate
"Candy Paint"	2007	Bone Thugs-n-Harmony, Autumn Rowe	Strength & Loyalty
"I Get My Paper"	2007	Cassidy	B.A.R.S. The Barry Adrian Reese Story
"Girlfriend" (Remix)	2007	Bow Wow, Omarion, Cassidy, Soulja Boy	—N/a
"Set It Off" (Remix)	2007	N.O.R.E., Red Café, Cassidy, Busta Rhymes, Talib Kweli	—N/a
"Who Wanna"	2008	Elephant Man	Let's Get Physical
"Five-O" (Remix)	2008	Elephant Man, Wyclef Jean, Assassin, Yung Joc, Diddy	Let's Get Physical
"Big Bank Take Lil' Bank"	2008	Bow Wow	Half Man Half Dog Vol. 1
"Drop"	2008	Fat Joe, Jackie Rubio	The Elephant in the Room
"Hi Hater (Remix)"	2008	Maino, T.I., Plies, Jadakiss, Fabolous	Maino Is the Future
"Pop Champagne" (Remix)	2008	Ron Browz, Lil' Kim, Ludacris	—N/a
"Toast 2 Toast"	2009	Bone Thugs-n-Harmony	Uni5 the Prequel: The Untold Story
"Shake It"	2009	Bow Wow	New Jack City II
"Arab Money" (Remix)	2009	Busta Rhymes, Ron Browz, Diddy, T-Pain, Akon, Lil Wayne	none
"Best I Ever Had" (Remix)	2009	Drake	none
"Rotate" (Remix)	2009	C-N-N, Ron Browz, Busta Rhymes, Jadakiss	none
"Billion Dollar Shift"	2009	Cardan, Red Café	Rebirth Vol. 2
"Ride Out"	2009	Cassidy	Best of the Hustla
"Stop the Party" (Remix)	2010	Busta Rhymes, T.I., Cam'ron, Ghostface Killah, DMX	—N/a
"It's Alive"	2010	Gucci Mane	The Appeal: Georgia's Most Wanted
"Holding You Down (Goin' In Circles)" (Remix)	2010	Jazmine Sullivan, Mary J. Blige	—N/a
"Henny and Bacardi"	2010	Cassidy	Face 2 Face EP
"I Like Dat"	2010	Trey Songz, T.I.	Passion, Pain & Pleasure
"Higher"	2010	Game, Jay Electronica	—N/a
"Power" (Remix)	2010	Kanye West, Jay-Z	GOOD Fridays release
"Lord Lord Lord"	2010	Kanye West, Mos Def, Raekwon, Charlie Wilson	GOOD Fridays release
"So Appalled"	2010	Kanye West, Jay-Z, Cyhi the Prynce, RZA	My Beautiful Dark Twisted Fantasy
"Keep It Rockin"	2011	Maino, Jadakiss, Jim Jones, Joell Ortiz	Keep It Rockin
"Mo'fucka"	2011	Bushido	Jenseits von Gut und Böse
"World's Greatest"	2011	DMX, The LOX, Drag-On, Murda Mook	Ruff Ryders: Past, Present, Future
"It's Over the Dog Is Back"	2011	DMX	Ruff Ryders: Past, Present, Future
"Showtime"	2011	Lil Waah	Ruff Ryders: Past, Present, Future
"Set It Off"	2012	Erick Sermon, Mone, Fred the Godson	—N/a
"In This Ho (Lambo)"	2012	Pusha T	—N/a
"Summer on Smash"	2012	Nas, Miguel	Life Is Good
"Holiday"	2012	Junior Reid	—N/a
"Even Louder"	2012	Danny!, Tanya Morgan	Payback
"Grand Wizard"	2012	The LOX	—N/a
"The Bottom"	2012	AR-AB	Who Harder Than Me 2
"Green Light Go"	2013	Jim Jones	—N/a
"Faces of Death"	2013	N.O.R.E., French Montana, Raekwon, Busta Rhymes	Student of the Game
"Get It In"	2013	Funkmaster Flex, Ne-Yo	Who You Mad At? Me or Yourself?
"Mad Fo"	2013	Ludacris, Meek Mill, Chris Brown, Pusha T	#IDGAF
"I Feel Like Pac/I Feel Like Biggie"	2013	DJ Khaled, Diddy, Rick Ross, Meek Mill, T.I.	Suffering from Success
"Go Off"	2014	Reek da Villain, Ace Hood, Kendrick Lamar	—N/a
"Classic"	2015	Meek Mill, Jeremih	Dreams Worth More Than Money
"Let Me See Them Up"	2016	Snoop Dogg	Coolaid
"Light It Up"	2016	Snoop Dogg	Coolaid
"Let The Beat Drop (Celebrate)"	2016	Snoop Dogg	Coolaid
"Way Back"	2016	Travis Scott, Kid Cudi	Birds in the Trap Sing McKnight
"Premio"	2017	Romeo Santos	Golden
"Maryland Ass Nigga"	2017	Jay IDK	IWasVeryBad
"Terminator"	2019	Giggs	Big Bad...
"Hercules"	2019	Common	Let Love

== See also ==
- Swizz Beatz production discography
