= Back of da Club =

Single by Mashonda

from the album January Joy
- B-side: "Girlfriend"
- Released: October 2005
- Recorded: 2004
- Genre: R&B
- Length: 3:34
- Label: Full Surface / J
- Songwriter(s): Kasseem Dean, Mashonda Tifrere
- Producer(s): Swizz Beatz

Mashonda singles chronology
"Get No Better" (2003)	"Back of da Club" (2005)	"Blackout" (2005)

Back of da Club is a song by American singer Mashonda from her debut studio album January Joy (2005). It was released as the lead single from the album in October 2005. It is the only single by Mashonda available on iTunes. The CD single track listing comes in MP3 format.

== Track listing ==
1. Back Of Da Club (Radio Edit)
2. Instrumental
3. Call Out Hook

== Chart positions ==
The song debuted at number 86 on the Hot R&B/Hip-Hop Songs chart.

=== Charts ===
Chart (2011)	Peak position
US Billboard Hot R&B/Hip-Hop Songs	86
