= Top Down =

Single by Swizz Beatz

from the album One Man Band Man
- Released: May 29, 2007
- Recorded: 2007
- Genre: Hip-hop
- Length: 3:08 (album version); 3:22 (original version)
- Label: Motown; Full Surface
- Songwriters: Kasseem Dean; Eric McCaine; Major Lance; Roger Hatcher
- Producers: Swizz Beatz; Jeff Bass

Swizz Beatz singles chronology
"Set It Off" (2007)	"Top Down" (2007)	"Blow Ya Mind" (2007)

"Top Down" is a song by American producer and rapper Swizz Beatz, included as the eighth track from his debut studio album One Man Band Man (2007). "Top Down" contains samples of swirls and riotous bursts of 1970s-soul horns from "Girl, Come on Home" by Major Lance.

== Background ==
In an interview with MTV, Swizz Beatz explained the song was initially meant for Nas: "The record was originally for Nas. I got Nas' vocals already. But I can't do Nas, and his energy is not right on there. It would be dead weight. No disrespect, but it can't be dead weight if I can't make it feel like reality. I need the shit crazy. I need to shoot a video! It's gotta be another 'It's Me Bitches,' but bigger. I could easily pull a Nas card and have people be like, 'Nas is spazzing on the verse.' But it has to be a movie. I got it. It just gotta make sense. I can get Nas, Jay-Z and Jadakiss on that. I can do that. It's light work, but it's gotta make sense."

On May 30, 2009, the song Nas recorded over the beat leaked online, entitled "Be Worried". On February 21, 2011, Swizz Beatz officially released the mastered version with Nas, for his series of free weekly mp3s and included it on his mixtape Monster Mondays Vol. 1."

== Music video ==
The song was featured in the second half of the music video for "Money in the Bank". In it, Swizz Beatz is in front of a green screen "riding" a Lamborghini. After the video was released, Swizz Beatz released the single on his Myspace.

== In media ==
"Top Down" gained recognition from being featured in the video game Grand Theft Auto IV as well as the 2010 movie The Other Guys.

== Single track listing ==
1. Top Down (Dirty)
2. Top Down (Radio)
3. It's Me Snitches
4. It's Me Snitches (Remix)
5. It's Me Snitches (Remix) (Instrumental)
6. It's Me Snitches (Remix) (A Capella)
