= Full Surface Records =

Record label founded by Swizz Beatz

- Parent company: BMG
- Founded: 2001
- Founder: Swizz Beatz
- Distributor: J
- Genre: Hip hop, R&B
- Country of origin: United States

Full Surface is a record label founded in 2001, by American hip hop recording artist and record producer Swizz Beatz. The label used to operate through Sony's J and through Universal's Interscope, Motown and Universal Motown. However, the label also had released material through joint ventures with other companies outside the Sony BMG group.

== History ==
Following his success as an in-house producer for his family's label Ruff Ryders Entertainment, Swizz Beatz launched his own imprint, Full Surface Records, through J Records in 2001 under the leadership of Clive Davis. Swizz served as the label's flagship artist while developing a roster that included singer Mashonda and rapper Yung Wun, who had previously recorded for Ruff Ryders' subsidiary imprint Ryde or Die Records.

By 2002, the label later expanded its roster with Cassidy, a battle rapper from Philadelphia whose group Larsiny was affiliated with Ruff Ryders through TD Entertainment, a subsidiary label operated by Swizz Beatz's father.

In a January 2003 interview with AllHipHop, Swizz Beatz said: "My new label [Full Surface] is on its way, by storm. We are moving like the army on the creep. I wanted something new so I got a mix of talent – Bounty Killa, Cassidy, Mashonda, Yung Wun, Big Tigg and Mr. Sweat – with me the beat man." Despite the affiliations of Bounty Killa, Big Tigger, and Keith Sweat, they were never officially signed to the label.

In March 2004, Full Surface Records released Split Personality, the debut studio album by Cassidy. The album was supported by the singles Hotel, and "Get No Better", featuring Mashonda. "Hotel" became Cassidy's breakthrough hit, reaching the top five of the Billboard Hot 100, while Split Personality peaked within the top three of the Billboard 200 and was certified Gold by the RIAA within a month of its release. Later that year, Yung Wun released his debut album, The Dirtiest Thirstiest. The album was led by the single Tear It Up, which became his highest-charting release and reached the Billboard Hot 100. Despite the success of the single, The Dirtiest Thirstiest failed to achieve significant commercial success, and Yung Wun was dropped from Full Surface and J by 2006.

In 2005, Cleveland-based rap group Bone Thugs-n-Harmony, signed with Full Surface and secured a distribution deal with Interscope, the following year. In 2005, DMX was about to sign to Full Surface but chose Sony Urban Music instead. "He felt like the situation wasn't complementing him," Swizz explained. "He just wasn't comfortable with the situation. ... It was just a whole mix up". In April 2006, it was announced Ruff Ryders alumni Eve, signed a joint venture deal with Full Surface and Dr. Dre's Aftermath. Eve went on to release the singles "Tambourine" and "Give It to You".

In September 2007, Interscope Records and CodeBlack Entertainment released Bone Thugs-N-Harmony's semi-autobiographical film I Tried. While the label was not credited in the film itself, it is associated with the film and stars Bone Thugs-N-Harmony and label founder Swizz Beatz. That October, it was announced another Ruff Ryders alumni, Drag-On, signed a record deal with Full Surface. A Drag-On project was expected to be released through Full Surface. However, as the label was unable to find distribution for the project, the album was shelved.

== Roster ==
Artists

- Bone Thugs-n-Harmony
- Cassidy
- Drag-On
- Eve
- Mashonda
- Rich Hil
- Swizz Beatz
- Yung Wun

Executives

- Swizz Beatz (Founder, CEO, executive producer)
- Grady Spivey (A&R)
- Ashaunna Ayars (General Manager)
- Terrence Dean (Management)

== DJs and producers ==
- The Individualz - A group of music producers, composed of Avenue, Joe Bravo and Jose, who have produced songs for Bone Thugs-n-Harmony, Swizz Beatz, 50 Cent, Jay-Z and Mary J. Blige.
- Neo da Matrix - A producer from Philadelphia. Also signed to Ruff Ryders Entertainment and was signed with Roc-A-Fella Records.
- Snags - A producer who has produced songs for Swizz Beatz and Jadakiss.
- Swizz Beatz

== Discography ==
- All releases distributed by J Records, unless otherwise noted.

Artist	Album	Details
Swizz Beatz	Swizz Beatz Presents G.H.E.T.T.O. Stories (released with DreamWorks)	Released: December 10, 2002; Chart position: 50 U.S.; Singles: "Guilty", "Bigger Business"
Cassidy	Split Personality	Released: March 16, 2004; Chart position: 2 U.S.; Singles: "Hotel", "Get No Better"; RIAA certification: Gold
Yung Wun	The Dirtiest Thirstiest	Released: December 7, 2004; Chart position: —; Singles: "Yung Wun Anthem", "Tear It Up", "Walk It, Talk It"
Cassidy	I'm a Hustla	Released: June 28, 2005; Chart position: 5 U.S.; Singles: "I'm a Hustla", "B-Boy Stance"
Mashonda	January Joy	Released: November 9, 2005; Chart position: Singles: "Back of da Club", "Blackout"
Bone Thugs-n-Harmony	Strength & Loyalty (released with Interscope)	Released: May 8, 2007; Chart position: 2 U.S.; Singles: "I Tried", "Lil' L.O.V.E."
Swizz Beatz	One Man Band Man (released with Universal Motown)	Released: August 21, 2007; Chart position: 7 U.S.; Singles: "It's Me Bitches", "Money in the Bank", "Top Down"
Cassidy	B.A.R.S. The Barry Adrian Reese Story	Released: November 6, 2007; Chart position: 10 U.S.; Singles: "My Drink n My 2 Step", "Innocent Man (Misunderstood)"
