= One Man Band Man =

Studio album by Swizz Beatz
- Released: August 21, 2007
- Recorded: 2006–2007
- Genre: Hip hop
- Length: 38:05
- Labels: Full Surface; Universal Motown
- Producers: Swizz Beatz; The Individualz; Needlz; Nottz; Snags; Neo Da Matrix; Eric McCaine; Young World Music

Swizz Beatz chronology
| Swizz Beatz Presents G.H.E.T.T.O. Stories (2002) | One Man Band Man (2007) | Poison (2018) |

Singles from One Man Band Man
- 1. "It's Me Bitches" Released: February 13, 2007; 2. "Money in the Bank" Released: May 29, 2007; 3. "Top Down" Released: September 28, 2007

Professional ratings
Review scores
| Source | Rating |
|---|---|
| AllMusic | 2/5 stars |
| IGN | (6.2/10) |
| Okayplayer | (89/100) |
| Pitchfork | (7.1/10) |
| PopMatters | (5/10) |
| RapReviews | (5.5/10) |
| Rolling Stone | 3/5 stars |
| Slant Magazine | 2.5/5 stars |
| Spin | 3/5 stars |
| XXL | 4/5 stars |

One Man Band Man is the debut studio album by American producer and rapper Swizz Beatz, released on August 21, 2007, through Full Surface Records and Universal Motown Records. The album features guest appearances from Drag-On, Lil Wayne, R. Kelly, Jadakiss, and Snoop Dogg, while production was handled by Swizz Beatz himself, the Individualz, Needlz, Nottz, Snags, Neo Da Matrix, Eric McCaine and Young World Music.

One Man Band Man was preceded by the singles "It's Me Bitches" and "Money in the Bank", both of which entered the latter 20 Billboard Hot 100 slots. Upon release, the album was met with commercial success and peaked at number seven on the Billboard 200, although critical reception were mixed. Its third single, "Top Down", was released the following month, and failed to enter any chart.

== Background and development ==
Swizz Beatz announced he was working on his first solo album on November 14, 2006, at Green Lantern's mixshow. The first offering was "Come and Get Me" featuring Cassidy and produced by Buckwild. Swizz said this about it: "This is the warm up... the push up before you hit the bar. I'm tired of playing the back. It's showtime. I'm ready to get it poppin'... come and get me."

The song "Part of the Plan" was supposed to be the third official single but due to low record sales and not enough promotion it was eventually dropped. The music video was supposed to be based on the movie Crash and was supposed to be directed by the director of the movie himself, Paul Haggis. The video was also set to be shot in London. It was replaced with "Top Down," whose video is seen at the end of the music video for "Money in the Bank."

== Commercial performance ==
One Man Band Man debuted at number 7 on the US Billboard 200, selling 45,000 copies in its first week, the album fell quickly, falling to 42 in its second week and 52 in its third. It also debuted at number one on the Billboard's Top R&B/Hip-Hop Albums chart. By September 20, 2008, the album had sold 159,400 copies in the United States.

== Track listing ==
| No. | Title | Writer(s) | Producer(s) | Length |
|---|---|---|---|---|
| 1. | "Product Man" | Kasseem Dean; Avery Chambliss; Michael T. Kennedy; William G. Hudspeth | The Individualz | 2:50 |
| 2. | "It's Me Bitches" | Dean; Gary Grice; Clifford Smith; Corey Woods; Dennis Coles; Jason Hunter; Lamont Hawkins; Robert Diggs Jr.; Russell Jones | Swizz Beatz | 2:34 |
| 3. | "Big Munny" | Dean; Dominick Lamb | Nottz | 3:33 |
| 4. | "Bust Ya Gunz" (featuring Drag-On) | Dean; Khari Cain; Melvin Smalls; Terius Gray | Needlz | 3:58 |
| 5. | "You Know Your Boy Did That" | Dean; Naki Levy | Snags | 4:46 |
| 6. | "The Funeral" | Dean; Quaadir Atkinson; Shandel Green | Neo Da Matrix | 2:57 |
| 7. | "Take a Picture" | Dean; Bill Withers; Skip Scarborough; Clifton Chase; Edward Fletcher; Melvin Glover; Sylvia Robinson | Swizz Beatz | 3:33 |
| 8. | "Top Down" | Dean; Eric McCaine; Major Lance; Roger Hatcher | The "E. McCaine" Edition; Swizz Beatz | 3:08 |
| 9. | "Money in the Bank" | Dean; Greg Taylor; Carlisle Young; Marlin Bonds; Eric Barrier; William Griffin; Sean Combs; Christopher Wallace; Sean Jacobs; Jason Phillips; David Styles; Kimberly Jones; Deric Angelettie; Terry Etlinger; Linda Laurie; Kia Jeffries; Akinyele Adams; Regi Hargis | Marlin "Hookman" Bonds; Carlisle Young (co.); Greg "Mayhem" Taylor (co.) | 3:11 |
| 10. | "Part of the Plan" | Dean; Green; Chris Martin; Guy Berryman; Will Champion; Jonny Buckland | Swizz Beatz | 3:14 |
| 11. | "Snoop" (skit) (performed by Snoop Dogg) | | | 0:52 |
| 12. | "It's Me... (Remix)" (featuring Lil Wayne, R. Kelly & Jadakiss) | Dean; Dwayne Carter; Robert Kelly; Phillips; Sean Garrett; Beyoncé Knowles; Angela Beyincé; Solange Knowles; Makeba Riddick; Isaac Hayes; David Porter | Swizz Beatz | 3:29 |
| Total length: | | | | 38:05 |

Leftover Tracks

- "Come and Get Me" (featuring Cassidy)

Sample credits

- "Product Man" contains an interpolation of "Heartbeat (It's A Lovebeat)" written by Michael T. Kennedy and William G. Hudspeth.
- "It's Me Bitches" contains a portion of "C.R.E.A.M."; written by Gary Grice, Clifford Smith, Corey Woods, Dennis Coles, Jason Hunter, Lamont Hawkins, Robert Diggs Jr., and Russell Jones; performed by Wu-Tang Clan.
- "Bust Ya Gunz" embodies portions of "Down Bottom", written by Terius Gray, Melvin Smalls, and Kasseem Dean.
- "Take a Picture":
  - contains a sample of "Lovely Day", written by Bill Withers and Skip Scarborough, performed by Bill Withers.
  - contains elements of "The Message", written by Clifton Chase, Edward Fletcher, Melvin Glover, and Sylvia Robinson.
- "Top Down" contains a sample of "Girl, Come on Home", written by Major Lance and Roger Hatcher, performed by Major Lance.
- "Money in the Bank":
  - embodies a portion of "Eric B. Is President", written by Eric Barrier and William Griffin.
  - embodies a portion of "It's All About the Benjamins", written by Sean Combs, Christopher Wallace, Sean Jacobs, Jason Phillips, David Styles, Kimberly Jones, Deric Angelettie, Terry Etlinger, and Linda Laurie.
  - embodies a portion of "Put It in Your Mouth", written by Kia Jeffries, Akinyele Adams, and Regi Hargis.
- "Part of the Plan" contains a sample of "X&Y"; written by Chris Martin, Guy Berryman, Will Champion, and Jonny Buckland; performed by Coldplay.
- "It's Me... (Remix)":
  - contains portions of "Get Me Bodied"; written by Kasseem Dean, Sean Garrett, Beyoncé Knowles, Angela Beyincé, Solange Knowles, and Makeba Riddick; performed by Beyoncé Knowles.
  - embodies portions of "C.R.E.A.M.", performed by Wu-Tang Clan.
  - samples portions of "As Long As I've Got You", written by Isaac Hayes and David Porter, performed by The Charmels.

== Charts ==
Chart performance
| Chart (2007) | Peak position |
|---|---|
| Canadian Albums (Nielsen SoundScan) | 92 |
| US Billboard 200 | 7 |
| US Top R&B/Hip-Hop Albums (Billboard) | 1 |
| US Top Rap Albums (Billboard) | 1 |
