= Mashonda =

American R&B singer (born 1978)

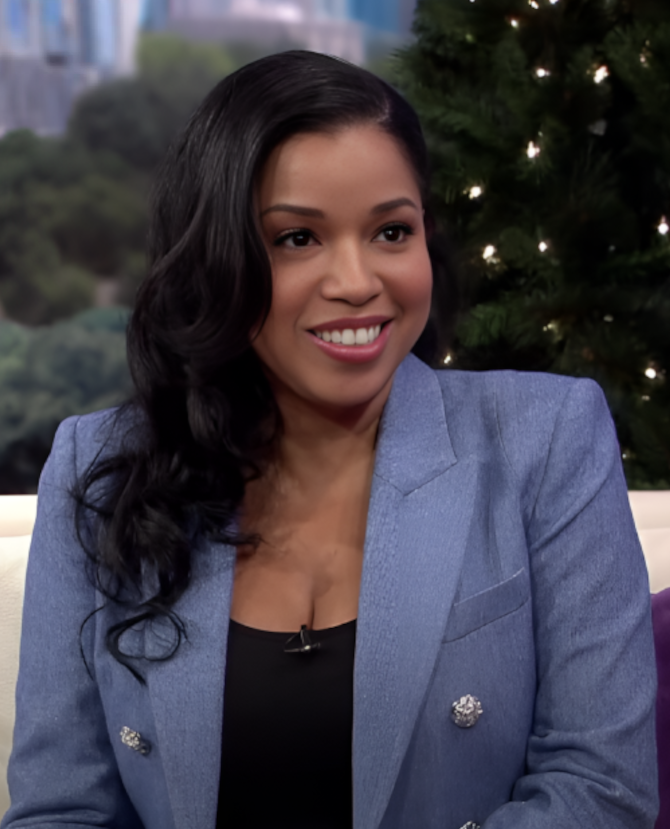
- Dean in 2018

Background information
- Born: Mashonda Karima Tifrere; January 9, 1978 (age 48)
- Origin: Boston, Massachusetts, U.S.
- Genre: R&B
- Occupation: Singer
- Years active: 1998–present
- Labels: J; Full Surface
- Children: 1

Mashonda Karima Dean (née Tifrere; born January 9, 1978) is an American R&B singer from Boston, Massachusetts. In 2004, she married record producer Swizz Beatz and signed with his record label Full Surface Records, an imprint of J Records to release her debut studio album, January Joy (2005). In 2011, Dean joined the first season of VH1's reality show Love & Hip Hop: New York.

== Musical career ==
In 1998, Mashonda signed a publishing deal with Warner Chapel Music. She subsequently wrote for singer Monifah and worked with Full Force. The following year, she signed a recording contract with Columbia Records.

In 1999, she was featured on American rapper Jay-Z's single "Girl's Best Friend", for the soundtrack to the film Blue Streak. The song, produced by Swizz Beatz, was also included as a hidden track on Jay-Z's fourth studio album Vol. 3... Life and Times of S. Carter (1999). Mashonda's vocals also featured on American rapper Eve's song "Gotta Man", produced by Beatz, from her debut studio album Let There Be Eve...Ruff Ryders' First Lady (1999). Mashonda went on to make guest appearances on American rapper Cassidy's "Get No Better", produced by Beatz, from his album Split Personality (2004), American rapper Fat Joe's Beatz-produced song "Listen Baby", from his 2005 album All or Nothing and guest appeared on Triple Seis' debut studio album Only Time'll Tell, featuring on the song "Skully".

Mashonda's debut album January Joy, produced by Beatz, Kanye West, and Raphael Saadiq, was released in November 2005 in Japan and United States. The album was supported by two singles, co-written by Beatz: "Back of da Club", featuring Beatz, and "Blackout" featuring Snoop Dogg. In March 2009, she released a mixtape titled The Renovation Series.. Mashonda took time off from her music career to raise her son.

== Other ventures ==
Mashonda was the author of a column, "Pandora's Box", on Vibe Vixen.

Mashonda authored a book on co-parenting, titled Blend: The Secret to Co-Parenting and Creating a Balanced Family (2018), with contributions from co-parents Swizz Beatz and Alicia Keys.

== Personal life ==
Mashonda began dating the record producer Kasseem Dean, known as Swizz Beatz, in 1998. She became pregnant, but suffered a miscarriage in 2000. She was the stepmother to Dean's son from a previous relationship, Prince Nasir; he was born during her pregnancy and she named him. Mashonda and Dean married in 2004. Their son, Kasseem Dean, Jr., was born in 2006. In 2008, the couple announced their break up. According to Dean, they had already been separated for nine or ten months by June of that year. The divorce was finalized in May 2010, with the couple citing irreconcilable differences.

== Discography ==
=== Studio albums ===
- January Joy (2005)
- Note To Self (2022)

=== Mixtapes ===
- The Renovation Series (2009)
- Love, Mashonda (2012)

=== Singles ===
As lead artist

- 2005: Back Of Da Club
- 2006: Black Out (feat. Snoop Dogg)
- 2006: Used To (Promo Only)
- 2009: Dirty Laundry (feat. Eve)
- 2009: No Panties (Buzz Single)
- 2011: Intrigued (Buzz Single)
- 2011: Juicy Fruit
- 2012: Touch Me
- 2012: Mystery (feat. Lil Mo)
- 2020: King
- 2021: Honey, I See You
- 2022: Forbidden Fruit
- 2022: Positive Distraction
- 2022: Complicated

As featured artist
Title	Year	Peak chart positions		Album
Title	Year	U.S.	U.S. R&B	Album
"Girl's Best Friend" (Jay-Z featuring Mashonda)	1999	52	19	Blue Streak: The Album and Vol. 3... Life and Times of S. Carter
"Get No Better" (Cassidy featuring Mashonda)	2003	79	51	Split Personality
"—" denotes releases that did not chart or receive certification.

=== Guest appearances ===
List of non-single songs with guest appearances by Mashonda
Title	Year	Album	Other artist(s)
"Crazy Girl"	2001	Rush Hour 2 (soundtrack)	LL Cool J
"Kiss Is Spittin'"	2001	Kiss tha Game Goodbye	Jadakiss, Nate Dogg
"You Could Be Blind"	2001	The Great Depression	DMX
"Be Me"	2001	Scorpion	Eve
"S.H.Y.N.E."	2002	Swizz Beatz Presents G.H.E.T.T.O. Stories	Shyne
"Ghetto Love"	2002	Swizz Beatz Presents G.H.E.T.T.O. Stories	LL Cool J
"Wanna Be Like Him"	2002	God's Favorite	N.O.R.E.
"Party in the Rain"	2002	Eve-Olution	Eve
"This Is Who I Am"	2003	La Bella Mafia	Lil' Kim, Swizz Beatz
"Skully"	2004	Only Time'll Tell	Triple Seis, 24K
"S.H.Y.N.E."	2004	Godfather Buried Alive	Shyne
"So Long"	2005	I'm a Hustla	Cassidy, Raekwon
"Listen Baby"	2005	All or Nothing	Fat Joe
"Take a Trip"	2007	B.A.R.S. The Barry Adrian Reese Story	Cassidy
"Luv Me Tomorrow"	2012	Black Hero Theme Musik	Omen, Karina Pasian, Amanda Seales, The Force

== Filmography ==
Year	Title	Role	Notes
2011	Love & Hip Hop: New York	Herself	Supporting Role (Season 1)
