= Who's Real =

Single by Jadakiss featuring Swizz Beatz and OJ da Juiceman

from the album The Last Kiss
- Released: June 16, 2009
- Genre: Hip-hop
- Length: 3:12
- Label: D-Block; Ruff Ryders; Roc-A-Fella; Def Jam
- Songwriters: Jason Phillips; Kasseem Dean; Otis Williams; Tyrone Johnson
- Producers: Snagz; Swizz Beatz

Jadakiss singles chronology
| "Respect My Conglomerate" (2009) | "Who's Real" (2009) | "Pride N Joy" (2012) |

Swizz Beatz singles chronology
| "Blow Ya Mind" (2007) | "Who's Real" (2009) | "Million Bucks" (2009) |

OJ da Juiceman singles chronology
| "Ridiculous" (2009) | "Who's Real" (2009) |

"Who's Real" is a song by American rapper Jadakiss, released June 16, 2009 as the fourth single from his third studio album The Last Kiss. The song features guest appearances from OJ da Juiceman and Swizz Beatz, the latter of whom produced the track.

== Background ==
The original version had a longer second verse: after Juiceman's lines follow the lines by Jusmula (beginning with "It's real funny when a nigga play a C.L.,/ O.S.E., I be trippin' like G.L." and so on). It also contained the word "bastards" in Jada's line "Couple of flips and then stash it, bastards", which got blocked out in the final version, so it would be totally without profanities.

== Music video ==
A music video was directed by Taj and shot on May 13, 2009. There are cameo appearances from Ja Rule, Clipse, Kanye West, Clyde Carson, DJ Webstar, Grafh, and Styles P. There are also various Ruff Ryders Lifestyles members with their motorbikes featured in the video. The music video was released as the “Jam of the Week” on MTV Jams on June 10, 2009.

== Remix ==
On June 9, 2009, American rapper DMX's verse from the remix leaked onto the internet. The whole remix was released on June 10. It features Jadakiss’ fellow D-Block cohorts Sheek Louch and Styles P, along with Eve, Drag-On, DMX and Swizz Beatz. Dubbed the “Ruff Ryders remix”, it sparked a long-awaited unification of the Ruff Ryders Entertainment.

== In media ==
The single's instrumental was used for a Powerade commercial, and for the Wake Up Calls on The Rickey Smiley Morning Show.

== Charts ==
| Chart (2009) | Peak position |
|---|---|
| US Bubbling Under Hot 100 (Billboard) | 25 |
| US Hot R&B/Hip-Hop Songs (Billboard) | 39 |
| US Hot Rap Songs (Billboard) | 18 |
