= Money in the Bank (Swizz Beatz song) =

Single by Swizz Beatz

from the album One Man Band Man
- Released: May 29, 2007
- Recorded: 2007
- Genre: Hip-hop
- Length: 3:12
- Label: Motown
- Songwriters: Kasseem Dean; Marlin Bonds; Greg Taylor; Carlisle Young; Sean Combs; Christopher Wallace; Kimberly Jones; Jason Phillips; Sean Jacobs; David Styles; Deric Angelettie; Terri Etlinger; Linda Laurie; Eric Barrier; William Griffin Jr.; Akinyele Adams; Kia Jeffries; Regi Hargis
- Producer: Marlin "Hookman" Bonds

Swizz Beatz singles chronology
"It's Me Bitches" (2007)	"Money in the Bank" (2007)	"My Drink n My 2 Step" (2007)

Music video
- "Money in the Bank" on YouTube

"Money in the Bank" is a song by American rapper Swizz Beatz, released May 29, 2007 as the second single from his debut studio album One Man Band Man (2007). The song contains an interpolation to essentially a whole verse from Eric B. & Rakim's song "Eric B. Is President." The song was also featured in the final dance sequence in the 2008 film Step Up 2: The Streets.

== Music video ==
The music video, directed by Syndrome, premiered on BET's 106 & Park on August 1, 2007. The second portion of the music video switches to a video for "Top Down", another song off Swizz Beatz's One Man Band Man album. The video has cameo appearances including Busta Rhymes and Eve.

== Remix ==
The official remix features guest appearances from Young Jeezy, Eve and Elephant Man.

== Charts ==
Chart (2007)	Peak position
US Billboard Hot 100	84
US Hot R&B/Hip-Hop Songs (Billboard)	22
US Hot Rap Songs (Billboard)	14
US Rhythmic Airplay (Billboard)	38
