= Split Personality (Cassidy album) =

Studio album by Cassidy
- Released: March 16, 2004
- Genre: Hip-hop
- Length: 58:58
- Labels: BMG; J; Full Surface
- Producers: Swizz Beatz; J. Brown; Felli Fel; Nottz; V. Flowers; Neo Da Matrix; Rockwilder

Cassidy chronology
Split Personality (2004)	I'm a Hustla (2005)

Singles from Split Personality
- 1. "Hotel" Released: September 29, 2003; 2. "Get No Better" Released: April 12, 2004

Split Personality is the debut album by American rapper Cassidy. It was released on March 16, 2004, by J Records and Swizz Beatz's Full Surface Records. The album debuted at number 2 on the US Billboard 200 and was certified Gold by the RIAA. It includes the single "Hotel", which reached the top 5 on the Billboard Hot 100.

== Background and recording ==
Recording sessions for the album began in 2003. The album was broken down into three parts. The first part of the record (credited as "Cassidy") was more pop and radio friendly, with records such as "Get No Better" and the R. Kelly assisted lead single "Hotel". The second part of the record (credited as "The Problem") was targeted directly towards Cassidy's fans, who began to support him following his appearances on various mixtapes, with songs such as "Blood Pressure" and "The Problem". The third and final part of the record (credited to "B. Reese") was more introspective and aimed towards his fans who have supported him since his early days of his rap career with "Husslin'" and "Real Talk".

== Singles ==
The album's lead single, "Hotel" featuring the R&B singer-songwriter R. Kelly, was created during recording sessions at Kelly's Chicago studio "The Chocolate Factory". Kelly also appears on the official remix to "Hotel", with guest vocals from the rapper Trina. The song was a hit and reached the top 5 on the US Billboard Hot 100, as of February 2004. The song was also nominated for a Vibe Award for the "Coolest Collabo" in 2004. The album's second single, "Get No Better", features guest appearances from Cassidy's label-mate Mashonda, as well as vocals from label owner and mentor Swizz Beatz. The song reached number 82 on the US Billboard Hot 100. It was followed up by a music video, which features Vida Guerra as the lead female. The songs "Take It" and "Make You Scream Pt.2" were also recorded during the Split Personality sessions but were eventually scrapped and later used only as official promotional singles from the album.

== Critical response ==
Professional ratings
Review scores
Source	Rating
AllMusic	2.5/5 stars
Blender	3/5 stars
RapReviews	7.5/10
Vibe	3.5/5 stars
USA Today	3/4 stars
XXL	XL (4/5)

AllMusic editor Andy Kellman described the album as "a minor disappointment while simultaneously showing promise". He considered the first third of the album as the disappointing section and the best tracks to be "Hotel", "Can I Talk to You" and "Real Talk". Vibe's Jesús Triviño found that on Split Personality, "Cassidy flows with a contagious swagger as cool as John Shaft’s. And, like the ’70s icon, Cassidy has enough street bravado and smooth charisma to be universally appealing [...] Though he trips over a few clichéd bumps, the Philly battle champ delivers—off the dome or not." Steve Jones, writing for USA Today, wrote that Cassidy "makes an impressive debut by showing his versatility on both hardcore and radio-friendly songs [...] Not surprisingly, the beats are first-rate on the inaugural release from Swizz Beatz's Full Surface Records. And Cassidy has the personality to make a lasting impression."

== Commercial performance ==
Split Personality debuted and peaked at number 2 on the US Billboard 200, selling 118,000 copies in its first week. On April 19, 2004, the album was certified Gold by the Recording Industry Association of America (RIAA) for shipments of 500,000 copies in United States. By July 6, 2005, Split Personality had sold over 414,000 copies.

== Track listing ==
Split Personality track listing
No.	Title	Writer(s)	Producer(s)	Length
1.	"My Interpretation"	Barry Reese; James Reigart	Felli Fel	3:08
2.	"Hotel" (featuring R. Kelly)	Reese; Kasseem Dean; Robert Kelly; Bernard Edwards; Nile Rodgers	Swizz Beatz	4:06
3.	"Lipstick" (featuring Jazze Pha)	Reese; Dean; Phalon Alexander	Swizz Beatz	3:45
4.	"Get No Better" (featuring Mashonda)	Reese; Dean; Harold Lilly; Mashonda Tifrere-Dean	Swizz Beatz	3:54
5.	"Make U Scream" (featuring Snoop Dogg)	Reese; Dean; Calvin Broadus; William Earl Collins; Gary Lee Cooper; George Clinton, Jr.	Swizz Beatz	4:03
6.	"Tha Problem" (skit)			1:18
7.	"Tha Problem"	Reese; Dean; Norman Rogers; William Drayton; Carl Ridenhour	Swizz Beatz	3:50
8.	"Pop That Cannon" (featuring Styles P)	Reese; Dean; David Styles	Swizz Beatz	4:10
9.	"Blood Pressure"	Reese; Jason Brown	J. Brown	3:32
10.	"Can I Talk to You" (featuring Jadakiss)	Reese; Jason Phillips	V. Flowers	4:26
11.	"Real Talk / Skit" (featuring Swizz Beatz)			1:05
12.	"Real Talk"	Reese; Dominick Lamb; Curtis Mayfield	Nottz	4:36
13.	"Husslin'"	Reese; Dean; Galt MacDermot; James Rado; Gerome Ragni	Swizz Beatz	3:13
14.	"I'm Hungry"	Reese; Dana Stinson; Dean; Ridenhour; Hank Shocklee	Rockwilder	3:53
15.	"Around Tha World"	Reese; Quaadir Atkinson; Berry Gordy; Alphonso Mizell; Dennis Lussier; Frederick Perren	Neo da Matrix	4:13
16.	"Hotel (Vacation Remix)" (featuring R. Kelly and Trina) (Bonus track)	Reese; Dean; Kelly; Katrina Taylor; Edwards; Rodgers	Swizz Beatz	5:46
Total length:				58:58

Sample credits

- "Hotel" contains replayed elements from "Rapper's Delight", written and performed by Bernard Edwards and Nile Rodgers.
- "Make U Scream" contains excerpts from "What's a Telephone Bill?", written by Bootsy Collins, Gary Lee Cooper, and George Clinton, Jr., as performed by Bootsy's Rubber Band.
- "Tha Problem" contains excerpts from "Terminator X to the Edge of Panic", written by Terminator X, Flavor Flav, and Chuck D, as performed by Public Enemy.
- "Real Talk" contains excerpts from "Back Against The Wall", written and performed by Curtis Mayfield.
- "Husslin'" contains excerpts from "Aquarius", written by Galt MacDermot, James Rado, and Gerome Ragni, as performed by Honey Cone.
- "I'm Hungry" contains excerpts from "Public Enemy #1", written by Carl Ridenhour and Hank Shocklee, as performed by Public Enemy.
- "Around Tha World" contains excerpts from "We've Got a Good Thing Going", written by Berry Gordy, Alphonso Mizell, Deke Richards, and Freddie Perren, as performed by Michael Jackson.

== Chart positions ==
=== Weekly charts ===
Weekly chart performance for Split Personality
Chart (2004)	Peak position
Canadian Albums (Nielsen SoundScan)	92
Canadian R&B Albums (Nielsen SoundScan)	23
US Billboard 200	2
US Top R&B/Hip-Hop Albums (Billboard)	1

=== Year-end charts ===
Year-end chart performance for Split Personality
Chart (2004)	Position
US Billboard 200	196
US Top R&B/Hip-Hop Albums (Billboard)	49

== Certifications ==
Certifications for Split Personality
Region	Certification	Certified units/sales
United States (RIAA)	Gold	500,000^{^}
^{^} Shipments figures based on certification alone.
