= Diamonds on My Neck =

Single by Smitty

from the album Life of a Troubled Child (shelved)
- Released: July 5, 2005
- Recorded: 2005
- Genre: Hip hop
- Length: 3:29
- Label: J
- Songwriter(s): Varick Smith, Kasseem Dean
- Producer(s): Swizz Beatz

Smitty singles chronology
"Diamonds on My Neck" (2005)	"Died in Your Arms" (2007)

"Diamonds on My Neck" is a song by American hip hop recording artist Smitty, released by J Records on July 5, 2005, as his commercial debut single. The song, co-written and produced by American musician Swizz Beatz, was set to be the lead single from Smitty's planned debut album Life of a Troubled Child, which was ultimately shelved. The single was released in 2005 to moderate success, charting at #89 on Billboard's Hot R&B/Hip-Hop Songs.

The song samples the hook of "Dangerous MC's", as performed by The Notorious B.I.G. The official remix of the song was released on November 5, 2005 and features verses from fellow American rappers Lil Wayne and Twista. The song's music video was directed by Hype Williams.

== Chart position ==
Chart (2005)	Peak position
U.S. Billboard Hot 100	N/A
