= Poison (Swizz Beatz album) =

2018 album by Swizz Beatz

Studio album by Swizz Beatz
- Released: November 2, 2018
- Genre: Hip-hop
- Length: 32:57
- Label: Epic
- Producers: Swizz Beatz; AraabMuzik; Gian Bravo; DJ Scratch; Bink!

Swizz Beatz chronology
One Man Band Man (2007)	Poison (2018)

Singles from Poison
- 1. "Pistol on My Side (P.O.M.S.)" Released: September 14, 2018; 2. "25 Soldiers" Released: October 3, 2018; 3. "Come Again" Released: October 26, 2018

Poison is the second studio album by American rapper and producer Swizz Beatz, released on November 2, 2018 by Epic Records. It is Beatz' first album as a lead artist since his 2007 album One Man Band Man. Poison features collaborations with Nas, Lil Wayne, Kendrick Lamar, and Young Thug, among others. The music video for the song "Pistol on My Side (P.O.M.S.)", featuring Lil Wayne and keyboards by Alicia Keys, was released on September 14, 2018. The single "25 Soldiers" was released on October 3, 2018.

== Background ==
Beatz credited J. Cole as executive producer alongside him as he advised him on song selection and album release. Beatz had recorded 70 songs for the album and used 10. He said he removed songs that were potential radio and chart hits. Three of the songs not included on the album are a track featuring Kanye West and Bono, another featuring Bruno Mars, and a collaboration with Jay Z, Nas, DMX, and Jadakiss that Beatz had previewed at a DJ battle with Just Blaze in 2017. Beatz said that the latter song will be released "when the timing is right". On the collaborations with other artists, he stated: "I handed all the creativity on the album to the artists, in their comfort zone. I didn't make it about Swizz. It's my album, but I'm a producer, and it needs to be about the artists that are on it". The album artwork, titled "End of Empire", was created by Los Angeles-based artist Cleon Peterson, and represents "upending the system, taking power back from the corrupt and fighting for justice." Producers on the album include Beatz, AraabMuzik, MusicMan Ty and Avery Chambliss.

== Release ==
The track list and album artwork was released by Beatz on September 13, 2018. "Pistol on My Side (P.O.M.S.)", featuring rapper Lil Wayne and Alicia Keys on piano, was the first song released, with its music video premiering on September 14, 2018. On October 3, "25 Soldiers" was released as a single. The album became available for pre-order at midnight September 14, 2018. It was released on November 2, 2018 by Epic Records.

== Track listing ==
Poison track listing
No.	Title	Writer(s)	Producer(s)	Length
1.	"Poison Intro" (featuring Áine Zion)	Kasseem Dean; Áine Ulomon Uhumuavbi; Mario M. Clavell	Swizz Beatz	1:43
2.	"Pistol On My Side (P.O.M.S)" (featuring Lil Wayne)	Dean; Dwayne Michael Carter, Jr.; Abraham Orellana	Swizz Beatz; AraabMuzik (co.)	2:35
3.	"Come Again" (featuring Giggs)	Dean; Nathaniel Thomson; Avery Chambliss	Avenue	2:59
4.	"Something Dirty/Pic Got Us" (featuring Kendrick Lamar, Jadakiss and Styles P)	Dean; Kendrick Duckworth; Jason Phillips; David Styles; Orellana; Roger Kay Karshner; Chuck Mangione	AraabMuzik	2:46
5.	"Preach" (featuring Jim Jones)	Dean; Joseph Jones; Gian Bravo; Kamaal Ibn John Fareed; Bryan Higgins; James Jackson; Ali Shaheed Jones-Muhammad; Trevor Smith; Malik Izaak Taylor	Gian Bravo	2:18
6.	"Echo" (featuring Nas)	Dean; Nasir Jones; George Spivey; James Baker; Carl Evans McDaniel; Melvin Lee Wilson	DJ Scratch; Music Man Ty	5:05
7.	"Cold Blooded" (featuring Pusha T)	Dean; Terrence Thornton; Misha Mullov-Abbado	Swizz Beatz	3:47
8.	"25 Soldiers" (featuring Young Thug)	Dean; Jeffery Williams; Orellana; Teddy Sinclair	AraabMuzik	4:47
9.	"Stunt" (featuring 2 Chainz)	Dean; Tauheed Epps; Roosevelt Harrell III	Bink!	2:59
10.	"SwizzMontana" (with French Montana)	Dean; Karim Kharbouch; Chambliss; Rodney Jerkins	Swizz Beatz; Avenue	3:58
Total length:				32:57

Sample credits

- "Poison Intro" contains a sample from "Somos", written by Mario M. Clavell, as performed by Raphael.
- "Something Dirty/Pic Got Us" contains a sample from "Boys with Toys", written by Roger Kay Karshner and Chuck Mangione, as performed by Gap Mangione.
- "Preach" contains a portion of the composition "Scenario", written by Kamaal Ibn John Fareed, Bryan Higgins, James Jackson, Ali Shaheed Jones-Muhammad, Trevor Smith, and Malik Izaak Taylor.
- "Echo" contains a sample from "Echoes of My Mind", written by James Baker, Carl Evans McDaniel, and Melvin Lee Wilson, as performed by New Birth.
- "Cold Blooded" contains a sample from "Circle Song", written and performed by Misha Mullov-Abbado.
- "SwizzMontana" contains a portion of the composition "The Things That You Do (Bad Boy Remix)", written by Rodney Jerkins.

Notes

- Violin on "Poison Intro" is composed and performed by Ezinma.
- Keyboards on "Pistol On My Side (P.O.M.S)" are performed by Alicia Keys.

== Charts ==
Chart performance for Poison
Chart (2018)	Peak position
US Billboard 200	73
US Top R&B/Hip-Hop Albums (Billboard)	39
