= My Drink n My 2 Step =

Single by Cassidy featuring Swizz Beatz

from the album B.A.R.S. The Barry Adrian Reese Story
- Released: June 20, 2007
- Recorded: 2006
- Genre: Hip hop
- Length: 3:12
- Label: Full Surface, Ruff Ryders, J, Epic
- Songwriters: Barry Adrian Reese, Kasseem Dean
- Producer: Swizz Beatz

Cassidy singles chronology
"B-Boy Stance" (2005)	"My Drink n My 2 Step" (2007)	"Innocent Man (Misunderstood)" (2007)

Swizz Beatz singles chronology
"Money in the Bank" (2007)	"My Drink n My 2 Step" (2007)	"C'mon Baby" (2007)

"My Drink n My 2 Step" is a song by American hip hop recording artist Cassidy, released as the lead single from his third studio album B.A.R.S. The Barry Adrian Reese Story (2007). The song features vocals and production from longtime collaborator Swizz Beatz. The song peaked at #33 on the Billboard Hot 100, making it his final song there.

== Background ==
The song is Cassidy's first single after his hiatus from music following a car accident and amnesia. The song samples Doug E. Fresh's "Nuthin'". Both Cassidy and Swizz Beatz use the Auto-Tune effect. The song was officially remixed featuring new verses from American recording artists, Kanye West and Ne-Yo.

== Music video ==
The music video premiered on Rap City, on September 10, 2007; it features a cameo appearance from American singer Mario.

== Track listing ==
=== Vinyl ===
1. "My Drink n My 2 Step" (feat. Swizz Beatz - radio mix)
2. "My Drink n My 2 Step" (feat. Swizz Beatz - instrumental)
3. "My Drink n My 2 Step" (feat. Swizz Beatz - club mix)
4. "My Drink n My 2 Step" (feat. Swizz Beatz - a cappella)

=== Remixes ===
- "My Drink n My 2 Step" (feat. Chingy & Swizz Beatz)
- "My Drink n My 2 Step" (Official Remix feat. Swizz Beatz, Kanye West & Ne-Yo)
- "Kicks n My New Dress" (feat. Nina Sky & Swizz Beatz)
- "My Drink n My 2 Step" (feat. Chingy, Swizz Beatz & Jermaine Dupri)
- "My Drink n My 2 Step" (feat. Jermaine Dupri & Swizz Beatz)
- "My Pepsi n My 2 Step" (feat. Shiz Lansky & Swizz Beatz)

== Charts ==
=== Weekly charts ===
Chart (2007)	Peak position
US Billboard Hot 100	33
US Hot R&B/Hip-Hop Songs (Billboard)	11
US Hot Rap Songs (Billboard)	6
US Pop 100 (Billboard)	56
US Rhythmic Airplay (Billboard)	24

=== Year-end charts ===
Chart (2007)	Position
US Hot R&B/Hip-Hop Songs (Billboard)	78
Chart (2008)	Position
US Hot R&B/Hip-Hop Songs (Billboard)	87
