= Swizz Beatz Presents G.H.E.T.T.O. Stories =

Compilation album by Swizz Beatz
- Released: December 10, 2002
- Recorded: 2001–2002
- Genres: Hip hop; East Coast hip hop; experimental
- Labels: Full Surface; DreamWorks
- Producers: Swizz Beatz (also exec.); John McClain (co-exec.); Tony Lopez; James Seawood; S. Davis; Khary & Keough; Saint Denson; Kid Klever; J. Brown; Metallica; Bob Rock

Swizz Beatz chronology
| Swizz Beatz Presents G.H.E.T.T.O. Stories (2002) | One Man Band Man (2007) |

Singles from G.H.E.T.T.O. Stories
- 1. "Good Times" Released: March 4, 2002; 2. "Guilty" Released: April 27, 2002; 3. "Bigger Business" Released: October 1, 2002

Professional ratings
Review scores
| Source | Rating |
|---|---|
| AllMusic | 4/5 stars |
| Blender | 1/5 stars |
| Entertainment Weekly | B |
| HipHopDX | 3/5 |
| RapReviews | 8/10 |
| Rolling Stone | 2/5 stars |
| XXL | XL (4/5) |
| USA Today | 2.5/4 stars |
| Uncut | 1/5 stars |

Swizz Beatz Presents G.H.E.T.T.O. Stories is a compilation album by American rapper and producer Swizz Beatz, released on December 10, 2002, under DreamWorks and his own label Full Surface. It debuted at number 50 on the US Billboard 200 album chart, selling 59,000 copies in its first week.

The album spawned three singles, including the hit "Good Times", as performed by Styles P. "Good Times" was also included on Styles P's 2002 debut album A Gangster and a Gentleman. The song "Shyne", as performed by Shyne, was included on his 2004 album Godfather Buried Alive, which was released while Shyne was imprisoned.

== Tracklisting ==
| No. | Title | Producer(s) | Length |
|---|---|---|---|
| 1. | "The Start (Intro)" | Tony Lopez | 1:47 |
| 2. | "Ghetto Stories" (performed by Swizz Beatz) | Swizz Beatz, James Seawood (co.), S. Davis (add.) | 3:38 |
| 3. | "Big Business" (performed by Jadakiss and Ron Isley) | Swizz Beatz | 4:34 |
| 4. | "Turn It Up (Interlude)" | Swizz Beatz | 1:45 |
| 5. | "Endalay" (performed by Busta Rhymes and Swizz Beatz) | Swizz Beatz | 4:58 |
| 6. | "Shyne" (performed by Shyne and Mashonda) | Swizz Beatz | 4:31 |
| 7. | "Ghetto Love" (performed by Mashonda and LL Cool J) | Swizz Beatz, Khary & Keough (co.) | 5:06 |
| 8. | "Alien (skit)" | Swizz Beatz | 2:13 |
| 9. | "Good Times" (performed by Styles P) | Swizz Beatz, Saint Denson (co.) | 4:25 |
| 10. | "Gone Delirious" (performed by Lil' Kim) | Swizz Beatz | 4:28 |
| 11. | "N.O.R.E." (performed by N.O.R.E.) | Swizz Beatz | 4:18 |
| 12. | "Let Me See Ya Do Your Thing" (performed by Birdman and Yung Wun) | Swizz Beatz, Kid Klever (co.) | 4:23 |
| 13. | "Island Spice" (performed by Eve) | Swizz Beatz | 4:27 |
| 14. | "Guilty" (performed by Bounty Killer and Swizz Beatz) | Swizz Beatz, J. Brown (co.) | 4:42 |
| 15. | "Salute Me (Remix)" (performed by Nas, Fat Joe, and Cassidy) | Swizz Beatz | 3:58 |
| 16. | "We Did It Again" (performed by Swizz Beatz, Metallica and Ja Rule) | Metallica, Bob Rock, Swizz Beatz (add.) | 4:44 |
| 17. | "Bigger Business" (performed by Jadakiss, Ron Isley, P. Diddy, Birdman, Snoop Dogg, Cassidy, and TQ) | Swizz Beatz | 3:57 |

Notes

• (co.) Co-producer
• (add.) Additional production

== Chart positions ==
=== Weekly charts ===
| Chart (2002–2003) | Peak position |
|---|---|
| US Billboard 200 | 50 |
| US Top R&B/Hip-Hop Albums (Billboard) | 10 |

=== Year-end charts ===
| Chart (2003) | Position |
|---|---|
| US Top R&B/Hip-Hop Albums (Billboard) | 81 |
