= Neo Da Matrix =

- Also known as: NDM
- Born: Quaadir Atkinson
- Origin: Philadelphia, Pennsylvania, U.S.
- Genres: Hip hop, R&B, electro house
- Occupation(s): Record producer, DJ
- Labels: Full Surface, Banga Squad, Ruff Ryders

Quaadir Atkinson, professionally known as Neo Da Matrix, is an American hip hop and electro house producer and DJ from Philadelphia, Pennsylvania. He has worked with Swizz Beatz as an in-house producer for Ruff Ryders Entertainment. Neo Da Matrix has produced for Cassidy, Jadakiss, Fabolous, Young Chris, Eve, Mýa, David Banner, Juelz Santana, Nina Sky, and Tru Life, among others.

== Personal life ==
He attended Stone Mountain High School in Stone Mountain, Georgia.

== Production credits ==
=== 2003 ===
==== Bravehearts – Bravehearted ====
- "I Will"

=== 2004 ===
==== Drag-On – Hell and Back ====
- "Bronx – Skit"
- "Tell Your Friends" (featuring Jadakiss)
- "Hector The Killer MC – Skit" (featuring Capone)
- "Busta – Skit" (featuring Capone)

==== Jadakiss – Kiss of Death ====
- "Air It Out"
- "Bring U Down"

==== Jin – The Rest Is History ====
- "Get Your Handz Off"
- "Chinese Beats (Skit)"
- "Senorita"
- "Cold Outside" (featuring Lyfe Jennings)

=== 2005 ===
==== Cassidy – I'm a Hustla ====
- "On The Grind"
- "A.M. to P.M."
- "6 Minutes" (featuring Lil Wayne and Fabolous)

==== Juelz Santana – What the Game's Been Missing! ====
- "Good Times"
- "Mic Check"

==== 4RON – The Start Up ====
- "Time Wasted"

==== Ruff Ryders – The Redemption, Vol. 1 (Mixtape) ====
- "Double R Wit Us" (Pirate)
- "Neo's Shit" (Infa-Red)

==== Ruff Ryders – The Redemption, Vol. 4 ====
- "If It's Beef..." (Jadakiss, Kartoon, Infa-Red and Flashy)

=== 2006 ===
==== Fabolous – Back Atcha (Mixtape) ====
- "Back Atcha" (featuring Swizz Beatz)

==== Young Chris – The Chain Remains: Rebirth Of A Dynasty (Mixtape) ====
- "Live"

==== Styles P – Time Is Money ====
- "Who Want A Problem" (featuring Swizz Beatz)
- "Who Want A Problem (Remix)" (featuring Swizz Beatz, Jadakiss and Sheek Louch)
- "Kick It Like That" (featuring Jagged Edge)

=== 2007 ===
==== Tru Life – Tru York (Mixtape) ====
- "Freestyle Intro" (Performed by Jay-Z)
- "Knives Like" (featuring N.O.R.E.)
- "Get That Paper"

==== Rihanna – Good Girl Gone Bad ====
- "Say It"

==== Hood Environment – Drag-On Presents: Welcome To Hood Environment 01 (Mixtape) ====
- "Hood Environment Anthem"
- "I Declare War"
- "My Life"

==== Cassidy – 7.7.7. (Mixtape) ====
- "I Don't Give A Fuck"

==== Mario – Go! ====
- "How Do I Breathe (Remix)" (featuring Fabolous)

==== Cassidy – B.A.R.S. The Barry Adrian Reese Story ====
- "Where My Niggaz At"

==== Swizz Beatz – One Man Band Man ====
- "The Funeral"

=== 2008 ===
==== Fabolous – There Is No Competition (Mixtape) ====
- "Suicide"
- "Fuck Wit' Street Fam" (featuring Neo Da Matrix)
- "Hustlas Poster Child" (featuring Cassidy)
- "Paperman" (featuring Neo Da Matrix)

==== Memphis Bleek – The Process ====
- "Hustla" (featuring Neo Da Matrix)

==== Tru Life – Tru Life ====
- "I Can't Believe" (featuring Swizz Beatz)

==== R.Jackman – The Struggle For Power ====
- "See You" (featuring Cassidy)

==== Maino – Maino Is The Future (Mixtape) ====
- "Take You Home"

=== 2009 ===
==== Jadakiss – The Last Kiss (album) ====
- "Can't Stop Me"

==== Rakim – The Seventh Seal (Rakim album) ====
- "Satisfaction Guaranteed"

=== 2010 ===
==== Drag-On – My Life, My Legacy, My Melody ====
- "Money" (featuring Neo Da Matrix)

=== Other ===
- "The Warning" Featuring Cashius Green & Pheo

==== Kidd Domination ====
- "Aww Man" featuring Cory Gunz, Smoke DZA, Freck Billionaire & Neo Da Matrix

==== Cassidy ====
- "You Already Know" featuring Fabolous & Beanie Sigel
- "Time"

==== Drag-On ====
- "D.W.I." featuring Sheek Louch

==== Jin ====
- "Lord Geezus"

==== Ruff Ryders ====
- "Do What We Gotta Do (Remix) featuring Infa-Red, Cross & 2Pac
- "Money On My Mind" featuring My-My, Drag-On & Flashy

==== Sin ====
- "Fly Away" featuring Tony Sunshine
- "Shake It Mami"

==== Styles P ====
- "Gunz Is Out"

==== Raekwon ====
- "Realer" featuring Maino

==== Tuge ====
- "Air It Out" featuring Busta Rhymes

==== Range ====
- "Go"
- "Fool"
- "Off The Market"
- "Vacancy"
- "Flatline"
- "Claptomaniac"
- "Guess I'm In Luv"
- "I Wanna Love You Down"
- "Would U Say"
- "No One Else"

==== Ya Boy ====
- "Do With That Money"
- "The Shit"

==== Neo Da Matrix ====
- "Cookie Pop"
- "Never Ending"
- "cLOUDs"
