= Super Gangster (Extraordinary Gentleman) =

Studio album by Styles P
- Released: December 4, 2007
- Recorded: 2007
- Genre: Hip hop
- Length: 57:42
- Label: D-Block; Koch
- Producer: Akon; Alchemist; Cafe Society; Dame Grease; DJ Green Lantern; Dragan Čačinović; Hi-Tek; Kid Capri; Mr. Devine; Poobs; Pete Rock; Swizz Beatz; Vinny Idol

Styles P chronology
Time Is Money (2006)	Super Gangster (Extraordinary Gentleman) (2007)	The Green Ghost Project (2010)

Singles from Super Gangster (Extraordinary Gentleman)
- 1. "Blow Ya Mind" Released: October 9, 2007

Professional ratings
Review scores
Source	Rating
AllMusic	3.5/5 stars
HipHopDX	3.5/5
Pitchfork	6.4/10
PopMatters	6/10
RapReviews	7/10

Super Gangster (Extraordinary Gentleman) is the third solo studio album by American rapper Styles P. It was released on December 4, 2007 through D-Block Records and Koch Records. Production was handled by Vinny Idol, Dame Grease, Poobs, The Alchemist, Akon, Café Society, DJ Green Lantern, Dragan Čačinović, Hi-Tek, Kid Capri, Mr. Devine, Pete Rock and Swizz Beatz, with F. "Hit" Neufville, Kristi Clifford and Styles P serving as executive producers. It features guest appearances from Akon, Beanie Sigel, Black Thought, Ghostface Killah, Max B, Raw Buck, Ray J, Swizz Beatz, The Alchemist, The Bully, The Lox, and comedian Tony T. Roberts.

The album debuted at number 52 on the Billboard 200, number 7 on both the Top R&B/Hip-Hop Albums and the Independent Albums, and number 4 on the Top Rap Albums charts with 28,500 sold in its first week. Its lead single, "Blow Ya Mind", reached number 6 on the Bubbling Under Hot 100, number 51 on both the Hot R&B/Hip-Hop Songs and R&B/Hip-Hop Airplay, number 31 on the Mainstream R&B/Hip-Hop Airplay, and number 19 on both the Hot Rap Songs and the Rap Airplay charts in the United States.

== Track listing ==
No.	Title	Producer(s)	Length
1.	"Intro"	Dragan Čačinović	0:41
2.	"Blow Ya Mind" (featuring Swizz Beatz)	Swizz Beatz	3:34
3.	"Let's Go" (featuring Ray J)	Hi-Tek	3:46
4.	"Alone in the Street"	Vinny Idol	3:42
5.	"In It to Win It" (featuring The Bully)	Mr. Devine; Café Society	4:29
6.	"All I Know Is Pain" (featuring The Alchemist)	The Alchemist	3:44
7.	"Got My Eyes on You" (featuring Akon)	Akon	3:52
8.	"Green Piece of Paper"	The Alchemist	3:38
9.	"Holiday" (featuring Max B)	DJ Green Lantern	2:56
10.	"Look at Her"	Poobs	2:47
11.	"Da 80's"	Kid Capri	2:38
12.	"Interlude 1" (featuring Tony Roberts)		1:05
13.	"Shoot Niggas" (featuring Raw Buck)	Dame Grease	3:44
14.	"Super Gangster"	Vinny Idol	2:52
15.	"Star of the State" (featuring Ghostface Killah)	Vinny Idol	3:28
16.	"U Ain't Ready 4 Me" (featuring Beanie Sigel)	Dame Grease	3:00
17.	"Interlude 2" (featuring Tony Roberts)		0:37
18.	"Gangster, Gangster" (featuring Jadakiss and Sheek Louch)	Pete Rock	4:03
19.	"Cause I'm Black" (featuring Black Thought)	Poobs	3:06
Total length:			57:42

iTunes bonus tracks
No.	Title	Producer(s)	Length
20.	"Hot Shotgun" (featuring Uninvited Guests)		4:08
21.	"5 Star General"	Vinny Idol	4:08
22.	"The Hardest" (featuring AZ)	Large Professor	3:43

== Charts ==
=== Weekly charts ===
Chart (2007)	Peak position
US Billboard 200	52
US Top R&B/Hip-Hop Albums (Billboard)	7
US Top Rap Albums (Billboard)	4
US Independent Albums (Billboard)	7

=== Year-end charts ===
Chart (2008)	Position
US Top R&B/Hip-Hop Albums (Billboard)	86
