= Entouch =

American R&B group

Entouch, 1991

Entouch was an American male Alternative R&B group, composed of Eric McCaine and Eric Smith, also known as Free.

They were signed to Elektra Entertainment during the height of the new jack swing era. The duo's 1989 debut album was called All Nite and featured two singles, "II Hype" and "All Nite". Entouch was previously a house music quartet with members Gordon "Commissioner Gordon" Williams and Sean Varo. They released their lone album - the 1987 debut, Without You.

The single "II Hype", released in 1989, peaked at No 18 on the Billboard R&B chart.

In 1990, the single "All Nite" entered the U.S. Billboard Hot 100 peaked at No. 71 (R&B No. 7).

The group released a self-titled second album in 1991. Soon after, Entouch disbanded, and McCaine went on to work in music production with other artists such as Keith Sweat, Jadakiss, Eve, Mista, Swizz Beatz, Bone Thugs-n-Harmony, Kut Klose and Lorenzo. Former Touch member Gordon Williams later became a recording and mixing engineer.

== Discography ==
- Without You (as Touch, Released 1987)
- All Nite (Released: June 19, 1989)
- Entouch (Released: October 29, 1991)

=== Singles ===
- "Without You" (as Touch, 1987)
- "Too Hype" (1989)
- "All Nite" (1990)
- "Drop Dead Gorgeous" (1991)
