= International Party =

Single by Swizz Beatz featuring Alicia Keys
- Released: August 1, 2011
- Genre: Hip-hop
- Label: Everest Entertainment
- Songwriters: Kasseem Dean; Avery Chambliss; Tyrone Johnson
- Producer: Swizz Beatz

Swizz Beatz singles chronology
"Everyday (Coolin')" (2011)	"International Party" (2011)	"Street Knock" (2012)

Alicia Keys singles chronology
"Wait Til You See My Smile" (2010)	"International Party" (2011)	"New Day" (2012)

Music video
- "International Party" on YouTube

"International Party" is a song by the American rapper and producer Swizz Beatz, released as a single through Everest Entertainment on August 1, 2011. The song was written by Beatz, Avery Chambliss and Tyrone Reginald Johnson, and produced by Beatz. It features vocals from American singer Alicia Keys. The music video for the single was directed by Chris Robinson. The song was released as part of the Reethym of Lite footwear campaign by Reebok Classic, for which Beatz at the time served as creative director.

== Background ==
In April 2011, while working on his second studio album Haute Living, it was reported that Beatz was appointed global creative director for Reebok Classics. In July 2011, Reebok and Beatz launched the Reethym of Lite campaign for Reebok Lite footwear and apparel collection. Beatz said that he "directed, wrote the treatment" for the campaign. Beatz chose the song "International Party" for the campaign, because "for me, the Reethym of Lite is an 'International Party' – it connects the sneakers being light, the rhythm of dance, music, art and style and the rhythm of the people". Beatz further explained that “When I finished the record I knew it was a perfect fit for the campaign - it just felt right”. The song was also going to be featured on the Haute Living album, but Beatz decided not to release the album, but instead release individual songs, saying:

"I don't wanna do the week thing -- I wanna put out every single as a movement. Right now I got 'International Party,' which is now the global campaign for Reebok. I got 'Rock'N'Roll,' me, Lenny Kravitz, Lil Wayne… I want people to feel every single like it's an album."

== Music video ==
Commissioned by Reebok, music video for the song, directed by Chris Robinson, was filmed at Downey Studios in March 2011. Robinson said of the video that "it’s about connecting all the continents on the planet on the world stage". Choreographer Hi-Hat selected dancers to appear in the video, including street dancers Lil Buck, Haspop, Destini Rogers, B-Boy L.L. Flex, Kelli Divincen, Daniel Graham, Duncan Tran and B-Boy Lil’ Bob. The video features laser lights installations by artist Eliav Kadosh. Anthony Osei from Complex described the video as "high-powered and light scattering". The video was released on August 1, 2011 and reportedly cost $1.4 million to make.

== Composition and critical reception ==
"International Party" is a dance track that runs for a duration of two minutes and thirty-seven seconds. The website Freshness Mag described the song as "fast paced techno dance anthem". Rap-Up wrote that the "feel good" song "boasts a rock-tinged beat" while according to MTV News the song is a "grinding, electro-hop track". The Boombox described it as "electronic dance track that marks a stylistic departure from Alicia and Swizz' respective genres". Trent Fitzgerald from PopCrush opined that Beatz and Keys "seem to be out of their elements with this hyper dance track" adding that Beatz "could use some work on his rap skills" while Keys "phon[ed] in her vocals".

== Live performances ==
On 22 August 2011, Beatz performed the song live at Reethym of Lite event during the Magic trade show at the Mandalay Bay’s Moorea Beach Club in Las Vegas.
