= I'm a Hustla =

Studio album by Cassidy
- Released: June 28, 2005
- Genre: Hip hop
- Length: 59:59
- Labels: Full Surface; TD; J; Sony BMG
- Producers: Swizz Beatz; Shatek; Neo da Matrix; Needlz; DJ Scratch; L.E.S.; Chris & Drop; Nerve & Surreal; Hotrunner

Cassidy chronology
Split Personality (2004)	I'm a Hustla (2005)	B.A.R.S. The Barry Adrian Reese Story (2007)

Singles from I'm a Hustla
- 1. "I'm a Hustla" Released: February 28, 2005; 2. "B-Boy Stance" Released: June 20, 2005

I'm a Hustla is the second studio album by American rapper Cassidy. It was released on June 28, 2005, by Full Surface Records and J Records. The album includes production from Bink, Devo Springsteen, Hi-Tek, Neo da Matrix, Nottz, L.E.S., The Individualz and Swizz Beatz, the latter of whom also executive produced the album. It features guest appearances from Nas, Quan, Mario, Mashonda, Raekwon, Lil Wayne, Fabolous and Mary J. Blige.

The album debuted at number 5 on the US Billboard 200, with 93,000 copies sold in the first week. It was supported by the singles "I'm a Hustla" and "B-Boy Stance". The album's title-track features a sample from Jay-Z's "Dirt off Your Shoulder" and the song was nominated for a Vibe Award in the category Street Anthem. A remix featuring Mary J. Blige followed soon after. In 2006, the ringtone version of "I'm a Hustla" was one of the first-ever ringtones to be certified platinum.

== Critical reception ==
Professional ratings
Review scores
Source	Rating
AllMusic	2.5/5 stars
PopMatters	7/10 stars
Rolling Stone	3/5 stars
RapReviews	8/10 stars
Vibe	3.5/5 stars

AllMusic editor Andy Kellman found that I'm a Hustla was "certainly harder overall than Split Personality; the seductive tracks are fewer in number and not nearly as melodic [...] Despite the concerted attempt to come off differently, I'm a Hustla isn't much more effective than Split Personality. PopMatters critic Matt Cibula wrote: "Some might think Cassidy hurts his arguments by playing all sides of the fence, but I would refer them to the original American rapper, Walt Whitman, and that dope line about contradicting oneself and containing multitudes. Cassidy is no Walt Whitman yet, but he might get there eventually, especially if he keeps trying to push the flow forward in his own weird visionary way. This is what I’m hoping happens. If he backslides and just goes for the cheddar, that will be a wiser business move, but a loss to American music."

== Track listing ==
I'm a Hustla track listing
No.	Title	Writer(s)	Producer(s)	Length
1.	"The Problem vs. the Hustla"	Barry Reese; Shatek King; Vince DiCola	Shatek	4:11
2.	"I'm a Hustla"	Reese; Kasseem Dean; Shawn Carter; Tim Mosley	Swizz Beatz	4:19
3.	"On the Grind"	Reese; Quaadir Atkinson	Neo Da Matrix	4:58
4.	"Crack"	Reese; Khari Cain	Needlz	4:42
5.	"B-Boy Stance" (featuring Swizz Beatz)	Reese; Dean	Swizz Beatz	4:00
6.	"A.M. to P.M."	Reese; Atkinson	Neo Da Matrix	3:40
7.	"Can't Fade Me" (featuring Nas and Quan)	Reese; George Spivey; Nasir Jones; Clifford Peacock; Oscar Brown, Jr.	DJ Scratch	4:13
8.	"Kick It wit You" (featuring Mario)	Reese; Leshan Lewis; Malcolm Shabazz Flythe; Shaffer Smith	L.E.S.	4:01
9.	"C-Bonics"	Reese; Dean	Swizz Beatz	4:09
10.	"Bellybutton"	Reese; Dean	Swizz Beatz	4:08
11.	"Get 'Em" (featuring Swizz Beatz)	Reese; Shroom Thompson; Chad Simon; Peter Cor; Beloyd Taylor	Nerve & Surreal	2:52
12.	"So Long" (featuring Mashonda and Raekwon)	Reese; Mashonda Trifrere; Brian Holland; Eddie Holland; Richard J. Davis; Melvin Miller	Drop	3:36
13.	"6 Minutes" (featuring Lil Wayne and Fabolous)	Reese; Atkinson; Dwayne Carter; Bill Kelly; Fran Boenza; Gerry Hludzik; Chris Hanlon; Carl Siracuse	Neo Da Matrix	6:26
14.	"The Message"	Reese; Terrance Lorlace; Syl Johnson; Glenn Watts; Jimmy Jones	Hot Runner; Rampage (co.)	6:34
15.	"I'm a Hustla (Remix)" (featuring Mary J. Blige) (Bonus track)	Reese; Dean; Mary J. Blige; S. Carter; Mosley	Swizz Beatz	4:10
Total length:				59:59

Sample credits

- "The Problem vs. The Hustla" contains a sample from "War", written and performed by Vince DiCola.
- "I'm a Hustla" contains a sample from "Dirt off Your Shoulder", written by Shawn Carter and Tim Mosley, as performed by Jay-Z.
- "On the Grind" contains a sample from "Wildflower", performed by New Birth.
- "Can't Fade Me" contains a sample from "Brown Baby", written by Oscar Brown, Jr..
- "Get 'Em" contains a sample from "Getaway", written by Peter Cor & Beloyd Taylor.
- "So Long" contains a sample from "Ain't It Good Feeling Good"; written by Brian Holland, Eddie Holland, Richard J. Davis, and Melvin Miller; as performed by Eloise Laws.
- "6 Minutes" contains a sample from "Castles"; written by Bill Kelly, Fran Bozena, Gerry Hludzik, Chris Hanlon, and Carl Siracuse; as performed by The Buoys.
- "The Message" contains a sample from:
  - "Is It Because I'm Black"; written by Syl Johnson, Glenn Watts, and Jimmy Jones; as performed by Syl Johnson.
  - Tupac: Resurrection, written and performed by Tupac Shakur.

== Charts ==
=== Weekly charts ===
Weekly chart performance for I'm a Hustla
Chart (2005)	Peak position
Canadian Albums (Nielsen SoundScan)	94
German Albums (Offizielle Top 100)	45
US Billboard 200	5
US Top R&B/Hip-Hop Albums (Billboard)	2
US Top Rap Albums (Billboard)	2

=== Year-end charts ===
Year-end chart performance for I'm a Hustla
Chart (2005)	Position
US Top R&B/Hip-Hop Albums (Billboard)	85
