= B.A.R.S. The Barry Adrian Reese Story =

Studio album by Cassidy
- Released: November 6, 2007
- Recorded: 2006–2007
- Studio: The Saltmine Studios
- Genre: Hip-hop
- Length: 61:12
- Labels: Full Surface; J
- Producers: Swizz Beatz; Bink; Devo Springsteen; Hi-Tek; Neo Da Matrix; Nottz; Cassidy; Dready; The Individualz; Lamont "Logic" Coleman; Devon "Gold" Golder

Cassidy chronology
I'm a Hustla (2005)	B.A.R.S. The Barry Adrian Reese Story (2007)	C.A.S.H. (2010)

Singles from B.A.R.S. The Barry Adrian Reese Story
- 1. "My Drink n My 2 Step" Released: July 25, 2007; 2. "Innocent Man (Misunderstood)" Released: November 26, 2007

Professional ratings
Review scores
Source	Rating
AllHipHop	8.5/10 stars
AllMusic	3.5/5 stars
RapReviews	5/10 stars
Rolling Stone	3/5 stars
XXL	3/5 stars
DJBooth.net	4/5 stars

B.A.R.S. The Barry Adrian Reese Story is the third studio album by American rapper Cassidy. It was released on November 6, 2007, by Full Surface Records and J Records. Before its release, XXL Magazine ranked the album the 10th most anticipated album of 2007. The album debuted at #10 on the Billboard 200 with 63,000 copies sold in the first week released.

== Background ==
The album was originally titled This Time Around, then it was changed to It Is What It Is and finally to B.A.R.S. The Barry Adrian Reese Story. Cassidy named the album B.A.R.S. after spending 8 months behind bars (in prison). B.A.R.S are also his initials, Barry Adrian Reese [Story]. The album features songs about his accident and his time in jail as well as his relationship with God. He also created a B.A.R.S. Competition Freestyle Battle with finalists, G.O.D. Jewels, 21, of Chicago, IL, Rocky, 17, of Detroit, MI, and Lil' Chugga, 23, of, Columbia, TN on October 10, 2007 live on MTV's Sucker Free.

== Production ==
Producer Swizz Beatz handled some of the production on the album. The album was released on Swizz Beatz's Full Surface Records imprint, a subsidiary of J Records. Other producers involved with the project were Neo Da Matrix, Don Cannon, Kanye West, Bink, Hi-Tek, and others.

Swizz Beatz confirmed before the album's release that Sean Garrett would have production credits on this album:

Swizz and Sean aren't only collaborating on music for world peace — they are also teaming up for some big upcoming albums. "Sean is an incredible talent," Swizz said, "and yes, he and I have formed a partnership to change the game. We have projects we are currently working on from J. Lo to Eve, Beyoncé to Cassidy."

Cassidy himself produced the track "All By Myself" which sampled "Me, Myself & I" by The Dramatics.

Three promotional mixtapes called "The Hustlas Home", "The Hustlas Home Pt.2", and "07-07-07" were released before the CD. The album received mixed reviews from critics. AllMusic described it as inconsistent but credited Cassidy's technical skill as a rapper, noting that his battle rap roots were evident throughout the record. RapReviews gave it a score of 6 out of 10, characterizing the album as competent but unfocused, with too many obligatory club tracks diluting the more personal material inspired by his prison experience and car accident. Rolling Stone awarded it three stars, while XXL gave it an XL rating, reflecting the album's stronger reception among hip-hop-specialist publications than mainstream critics.

== Features ==
Guest appearances include Swizz Beatz, Bone Thugs-N-Harmony, Eve, Angie Stone, Larsiny, Mashonda, Mark Morrison, Rell and John Legend.

"Celebrate" featuring John Legend samples jazz singer Nina Simone's version of the song "Strange Fruit."

== Track listing ==
#	Title	Producer(s)	Featured guest(s)	Time
1	"Intro (B.A.R.S. vs. da Hustla)"	Avenue & Joe Bravo of The Individuals		6:19
2	"My Drink n My 2 Step"	Swizz Beatz & Anthem Frost	Swizz Beatz	3:12
3	"Where My Niggaz At"	Neo Da Matrix		4:51
4	"I Will Never Tell (Uh Uh)"	Lamont "Logic" Coleman & Devon "Gold" Golder		4:38
5	"I Pray"	Lamont "Logic" Coleman & Devon "Gold" Golder	Shizlansky from Larsiny	4:56
6	"Innocent"	Swizz Beatz	Mark Morrison	4:11
7	"Cash Rulez"	Hi-Tek	Bone Thugs-n-Harmony & Eve	3:53
8	"Leanin' on the Lord"	Swizz Beatz	Angie Stone	5:07
9	"Damn I Miss the Game"	Bink	Rell	3:24
10	"Done 4 Me"	Dready		3:29
11	"I Get My Paper"	Nottz	Swizz Beatz	4:40
12	"Take a Trip"	Swizz Beatz	Mashonda	3:33
13	"Celebrate"	Kanye West & Devo Springsteen	John Legend	3:57
14	"All By Myself"	Cassidy		5:02

== Charts ==
=== Weekly charts ===
Chart (2007–2008)	Peak position
US Billboard 200	10
US Top R&B/Hip-Hop Albums (Billboard)	3
US Top Rap Albums (Billboard)	2

=== Year-end charts ===
Chart (2008)	Position
US Top R&B/Hip-Hop Albums (Billboard)	96
