= It's Me Bitches =

2007 single by Swizz Beatz

Single by Swizz Beatz

from the album One Man Band Man
- Released: February 13, 2007
- Recorded: 2006
- Genre: Hip-hop
- Length: 2:42
- Label: Universal Motown
- Songwriter: Kasseem Dean
- Producer: Swizz Beatz

Swizz Beatz singles chronology
"New York Shit" (2006)	"It's Me Bitches" (2007)	"Money in the Bank" (2007)

Music video
- "It's Me Bitches" on YouTube

"It's Me Bitches" (censored as "It's Me Snitches") is a song by American producer and rapper Swizz Beatz. The song, released February 13, 2007, serves as the lead single from his debut studio album, One Man Band Man (2007). The single debuted on the Billboard Hot 100 at number 100 and peaked at number 83.

An edited version of the song was featured on the Madden 2008 soundtrack. The song gained popularity on So You Think You Can Dance when Robert Muraine gave a fairly lengthy audition set to the edited instrumental version of the song, and it was used again in season 6, episode 11 of Entourage.

== Background ==
The unusual beat was created by Swizz Beatz while having fun and felt to make a song. The warping effect was from Crazy Town's Hollywood Babylon. He recalled: "I did the beat because I felt like making the beat."

== Music video ==
The music video was directed by Benny Boom. Cameo appearances include Bone Thugs-n-Harmony, Fabolous, DJ Felli Fel, and DJ Enuff of Hot 97.

== Charts ==
Chart (2007)	Peak position
US Billboard Hot 100	83
US Hot R&B/Hip-Hop Songs (Billboard)	30
US Hot Rap Songs (Billboard)	17

== Remix ==
"It's Me Bitches (Remix)"

Song by Swizz Beatz featuring Lil Wayne, R. Kelly and Jadakiss

from the album One Man Band Man
- Genre: Hip-hop
- Length: 3:29
- Label: Motown
- Songwriters: Kasseem Dean; Jason Phillips; Robert Kelly; Dwayne Carter; Isaac Hayes; David Porter; Beyoncé Knowles; Solange Knowles; Sean Garrett; Makeba Riddick; Angela Beyincé
- Producer: Swizz Beatz

A remix was released entitled "It's Me Bitches (Remix)", which was also included on the album. It features fellow American rappers Lil Wayne and Jadakiss, along with American singer R. Kelly. The track was number 85 on Rolling Stone's 100 Best Songs of 2007 saying

R. Kelly delivers one of the most vivid boasts of all time ("After sex, I beat my chest like King Kong!"), and Swizz brings a freaked-out track that eventually resolves into the Wu-Tang's classic "C.R.E.A.M." beat.

The line on Wayne's verse, "He so sweet make her wanna lick the wrapper, so I let her lick the rapper", was later popularized on his 2008 hit single, "Lollipop", taken from his sixth studio album, Tha Carter III.
