= Blow Ya Mind =

Single by Styles P featuring Swizz Beatz

from the album Super Gangster (Extraordinary Gentleman)
- Released: October 9, 2007 (U.S.); May 10, 2010 (UK)
- Recorded: 2007
- Genre: Hip-hop
- Length: 3:34
- Label: Phantom; Koch; Ruff Ryders
- Songwriters: David Styles; Kasseem Dean
- Producer: Swizz Beatz

Styles P singles chronology
"Kiss Your Ass Goodbye" (2005)	"Blow Ya Mind" (2007)	"B.M.F. (Blowin' Money Fast)" (2010)

Swizz Beatz singles chronology
"C'mon Baby" (2007)	"Blow Ya Mind" (2007)	"Swing Ya Rag" (2008)

Music video
- "Blow Ya Mind" on YouTube

"Blow Ya Mind" is a song by American rapper Styles P featuring vocals and production from Swizz Beatz. The song, taken from his third studio album Super Gangster (Extraordinary Gentleman), was released October 9, 2007 as the album's lead single. "Blow Ya Mind" is considered to be the sequel to his 2002 debut single "Good Times", which was also produced by Swizz Beatz.

== Music video ==
The music video was directed by Todd Angkasuwan and Styles P. Cameo appearances in the video are made by Idris Elba and fellow D-Block member Sheek Louch. In the video, Styles P is sitting on a bench and starts having hallucinations.

== Remix ==
The official remix features Swizz Beatz, along with Styles P's D-Block cohorts Jadakiss and Sheek Louch. The remix appears in the video game Grand Theft Auto IV.

== Chart ==
The song peaked at number 19 on the Billboard Hot Rap Tracks chart, and number 51 on the Hot R&B/Hip-Hop Songs chart.

Chart (2008)	Peak Position
U.S. Billboard Hot R&B/Hip-Hop Songs	51
U.S. Billboard Hot Rap Tracks	19
UK Singles Chart	127
