= Jin discography =

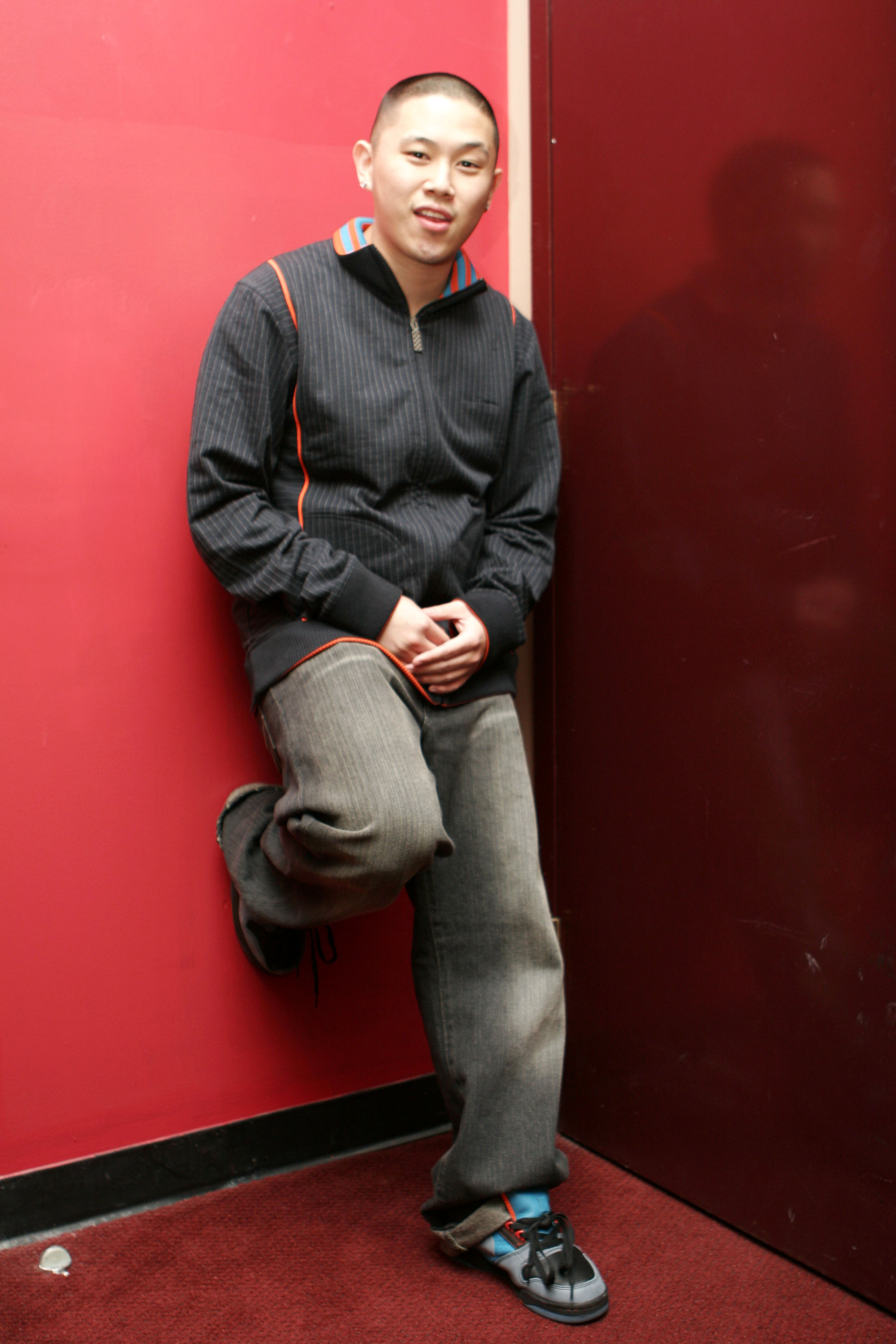
- Jin in the earlier days of his rapping career
- Studio albums: 7
- Extended plays: 3
- Singles: 11
- Music videos: 23
- Collaborative albums: 1

This is the discography of Jin (also known as Jin the Emcee, 100 Grand Jin and MC Jin), a Chinese-American rapper who makes English and Cantonese songs.

== Albums ==
=== Studio albums ===
Title	Album details	Peak chart positions	
Title	Album details	US	US R&B/Hip-Hop
The Rest Is History	Released: October 19, 2004; Label: Ruff Ryders/Virgin Records; Formats: CD, digital download, Vinyl LP	54	12
The Emcee's Properganda	Released: October 25, 2005; Label: Crafty Plugz/Draft Records; Formats: CD, Vinyl LP	—	—
100 Grand Jin	Released: August 29, 2006; Label: Crafty Plugz/Draft Records; Formats: CD	—	—
I Promise	Released: November 1, 2006; Label: Crafty Plugz/Phase One; Formats: CD	—	—
ABC	Released: February 20, 2007; Label: Crafty Plugz/Catch Music Group/Imperial Records/Raptivism Records, Universal Music Hong Kong; Formats: CD	—	—
回香靖	Released: August 8, 2011; Label: Catch Music Group/Universal Music Hong Kong; Formats: CD	—	—
XIV:LIX	Released: October 21, 2014; Label: The Great Company; Formats: CD, digital download	—	—
"—" denotes releases that did not chart.

==== Collaborative albums ====
Title	Album details
買一送一 (With 陳奐仁 aka Hanjin)	Released: July 13, 2010; Label: BBS Records; Formats: CD, digital download

=== Mixtapes ===
List of mixtapes
- 1996 Demo
  - Mixed/Hosted/Presented by:
  - Released: 1996(?)
  - Label:
- Holla-Front
  - Mixed/Hosted/Presented by:
  - Released:
  - Label:
- The Best of MC Battles Vol. 1
  - Mixed/Hosted/Presented by:
  - Released: 2001
  - Label:
- Swallow It Vol. 1
  - Mixed/Hosted/Presented by:
  - Released: 2002
  - Label:
- Best of Jin
  - Mixed/Hosted/Presented by:
  - Released:
  - Label: 2002
- The Next Generation
  - Mixed/Hosted/Presented by:
  - Released:
  - Label:
- Straight Jin No Chaser
  - Mixed/Hosted/Presented by:
  - Released:
  - Label:
- Friends and Family: Almost Famous
  - Mixed/Hosted/Presented by:
  - Released: 2003
  - Label:
- The Yellow Tape
  - Mixed/Hosted/Presented by: DJ Kool Kid
  - Released: 2004
  - Label: Ruff Ryders
- History In The Making
  - Mixed/Hosted/Presented by: DJ LRM
  - Released: 200?
  - Label: Ruff Ryders
- The Definition Of History
  - Mixed/Hosted/Presented by: DJ LRM
  - Released: 200?
  - Label: Ruff Ryders
- Lost History
  - Mixed/Hosted/Presented by: DJ LRM
  - Released: 200?
  - Label: Ruff Ryders
- Asia Tour Mixtape
  - Mixed/Hosted/Presented by: Jin
  - Released: 2005
  - Label: Catch Music Group/Virgin Records/Ruff Ryders
- G.a.R.T.E.E.'s World
  - Mixed/Hosted/Presented by:
  - Released: 2005
  - Label:
- I Quit (The Last Mixtape)
  - Mixed/Hosted/Presented by: DJ Exclusive
  - Released:
  - Label:
- Super-Lyrical: World Champion
  - Mixed/Hosted/Presented by: Sammy Needlz
  - Released: 2005
  - Label:
- Mass Appeal
  - Mixed/Hosted/Presented by: DJ Heat
  - Released: 2006
  - Label:
- Mass Appeal: Vol. 2
  - Mixed/Hosted/Presented by: DJ Heat
  - Released: 200?
  - Label:
- A Couple Songs And Some Freestyles
  - Mixed/Hosted/Presented by:
  - Released: 200?
  - Label:
- 免費Rap
  - Mixed/Hosted/Presented by:
  - Released: January 25, 2009
  - Label: Universal Music Hong Kong/Hennessy Artistry
- VLT Christmas Mixtape (aka:VLT Merry X'mas)
  - Mixed/Hosted/Presented by:
  - Released: 2009
  - Label:
- 2010 Hip Hop Census
  - Mixed/Hosted/Presented by:
  - Released: 2010
  - Label:
- Say Something
  - Mixed/Hosted/Presented by:
  - Released:May 15, 2010
  - Label: Catch Music Group
- Crazy Love Ridiculous Faith
  - Mixed/Hosted/Presented by:
  - Released: 28 August 2012
  - Label: Catch Adventures

== Extended plays ==
Title	EP details
Sincerely Yours	Released: May 2011; Label: Catch Music Group; Formats: digital download
Brand New Me	Released: December 11, 2012; Label: Catch Music Group; Formats: digital download
Hypocrite	Released: December 10, 2013; Label: The Great Company; Formats: CD, digital download

- Jin released an EP named Sincerely Yours 2.0, which was basically the same as Sincerely Yours but re-recorded and remastered.

== Singles ==
Title	Year	Peak chart positions			Album
Title	Year	US	AUS	UK	Album
"Learn Chinese" (featuring Wyclef Jean)	2003	—	40	59	The Rest Is History
"Senorita"	2003	—	—	—	The Rest Is History
"So Afraid"	2003	—	—	—	The Rest Is History
"Get Your Handz Off" (featuring Swizz Beatz)	2003	—	—	—	The Rest Is History
"Top 5 (Dead or Alive)"	2005	—	—	—	The Emcee's Properganda
"ABC"	2007	—	—	—	ABC
"人氣急升"	2011	—	—	—	回香靖
"Charlie Sheen" (with Dumbfoundead & Traphik)	2011	—	—	—	non-album single
"Aiya!" (featuring Toestah)	2011	—	—	—	non-album single
"Shoot for the Moon"	2011	—	—	—	non-album single
"When the Lights Come On" (featuring Joseph Vincent)	2011	—	—	—	non-album single

== Music videos ==
Year	Video	Director	Video Link(YouTube)	Notes
2004	"Learn Chinese" (featuring Wyclef Jean)		Jin – Learn Chinese emimusic	
2004	"Senorita"		Jin – Senorita emimusic	
2005	"Top 5 (Dead or Alive)"	Todd Angkasuwan	Jin - Top 5 (Dead or Alive) (Music Video) joemsyt	Uses a collection of people voting for their top 5 rappers.
2005	"Come Closer (Kohl Aaja)" (with Juggy D)		Juggy D feat Jin – Come Closer (Kohl Aaja) 2Point9Records	
2006	"FYI" (featuring Young Mac)	Todd Angkasuwan		
2007	"Yo Yo Ma" (with Sphere)		JIN Yo Yo Ma CarlChoi	Contains a mix of languages including English, Japanese and Cantonese.
2007	"ABC"	Todd Angkasuwan	Jin 歐陽靖 'ABC' MV universalmusichk	Cantonese. Contains a short appearance of the producers of the song, Far East Movement.
2008	"搵兩餐"(featuring Ken Oak)	Daniel Wu / Jason Tobin	Jin 歐陽靖 '搵兩餐' MV universalmusichk	Cantonese
2008	"飲啖茶"	Evan Jackson Leong	Jin 歐陽靖 '飲啖茶' MV universalmusichk	Cantonese
2008	"香港Superstar"	Jason Tobin	Jin 歐陽靖 '香港Superstar' MV universalmusichk	Cantonese
2008	"上堂時間"		Jin 歐陽靖 '上堂時間' MV universalmusichk	Cantonese
2008	"喂喂搵邊位"	Kim Chan	Jin 歐陽靖 '喂喂搵邊位' MV universalmusichk	Cantonese
2010	"Angels"	Hosanna Wong	JIN "Angels" Official Music Video (2010) AyoJinTV	
2010	"The A List"	Carl Choi& Jin Au-Yeung		Deleted from YouTube.
2010	"711" (featuring KT)		"711" – MC Jin feat. KT ayojinhk	Cantonese. Filmed in 7-Eleven.
2010	"It's About Time"		Romago Presents: MC Jin "It's About Time" ayojinhk	Cantonese
2011	"Charlie Sheen" (with Traphik & Dumbfoundead)	Kevin Boston	"CHARLIE SHEEN" (Official Music Video) Jin x Dumbfoundead x Traphik AyoJinTV	
2011	"人氣急升"	Kevin Boston	MC Jin人氣急升MV ayojinhk	Cantonese
2011	"Aiya!" (featuring Toestah)		AIYA – Jin feat. Toestah AyoJinTV	Song repeated twice to fit all pictures in.
2011	"Shoot for the Moon"	Carl Choi	JIN "Shoot for the Moon" Official Music Video (2011) AyoJinTV	Song edited for video. Uses various images and video from his life and career.
2011	"發咗達"	Benny Lou	MC Jin發咗達MV ayojinhk	Cantonese
2011	"立立亂"	Evan Leong	MC Jin立立亂MV ayojinhk	Cantonese
2011	"紅館見"		MCJin紅館見MV ayojinhk	Cantonese
2011	"When The Lights Come On" (featuring Joseph Vincent)	Duno Tran	"When The Lights Come On" (Official Music Video) - Jin feat. Joseph Vincent AyoJinTV	
2012	"率性" (with KT & Kiki Tam)		MCJin/KT/KikiTam率性MV ayojinhk	Cantonese
