= No Sleep til Shanghai =

- No Sleep til Shanghai film poster
- Directed by: Todd Angkasuwan
- Produced by: Carl Choi; Todd Angkasuwan
- Starring: Jin Au-Yeung
- Distributed by: Raptivism/Imperial/Caroline/EMI
- Release date: May 22, 2007
- Running time: 70 minutes
- Languages: English, Cantonese, Mandarin

No Sleep til Shanghai is a 2007 biographical documentary film based on the life and music career of the Asian-American rapper, Jin Au-Yeung, who goes by "Jin" . The film was directed by Todd Angkasuwan and follows Jin as he navigates and overcomes racial barriers in the rap industry. He gained fame in the early 2000s and is notable for being one of the first Asian-American rappers to achieve mainstream success in the United States.

The film covers various aspects of his personal and professional life, highlighting his challenges and accomplishments in a competitive and evolving music industry.

== Synopsis ==
The film follows Jin and his crew as they tour Asia to promote his debut album The Rest is History. Jin initially gained popularity after winning the "Freestyle Friday" rap battle on BET's 106 and Park, for seven consecutive weeks. The film documents how Jin became the first Asian-American rapper to sign a recording deal with a major label (Virgin Records - Ruff Ryders). It attempts to showcase the life of a rapper and the growing hip-hop communities in Asian cities such as Hong Kong, Shanghai, Taipei and Tokyo.

== Awards and nominations ==
- Atlanta Hip Hop Film Festival - Best Documentary (nominee)
- San Francisco Int'l Asian American Film Festival - Best Documentary (nominee)
