= DJ Iroc =

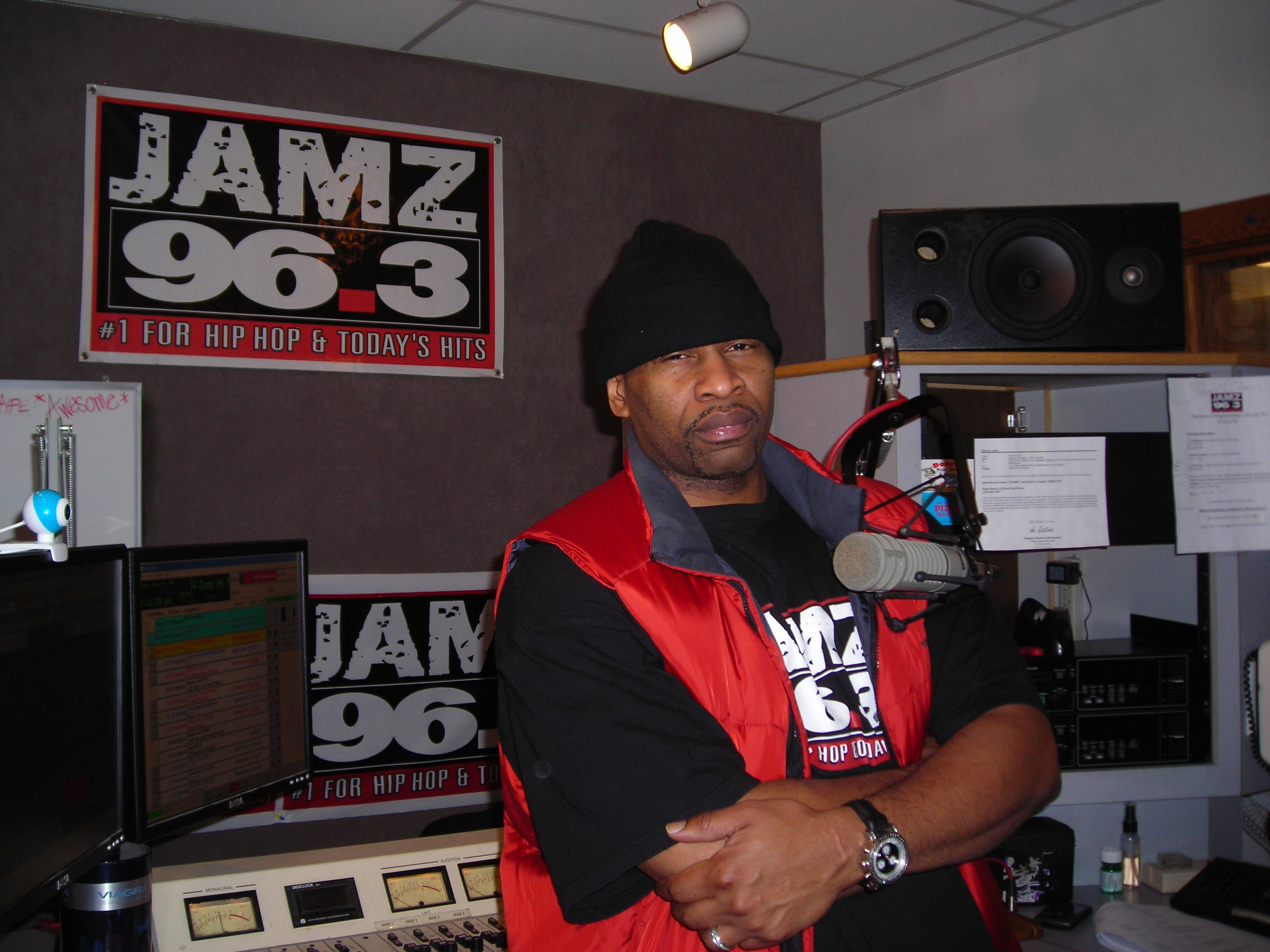
- DJ Iroc

Background information
- Also known as: Iroc
- Born: Brian Angelo
- Origin: The Bronx, New York City, U.S.
- Genres: Hip hop; turntablism
- Occupations: DJ; turntablist; producer
- Years active: 1989—present
- Labels: Ruff Ryders

Brian Angelo, better known as DJ Iroc, is an American DJ and Producer from The Bronx, New York, and co-founder of the DJ groups Amerika's Most Wanted DJs and Europe's Most Wanted DJs. DJ Iroc has performed on many world tours, including touring with Alicia Keys, and a former co-host of 5 radio shows on Jamz 96.3 FM.

== Biography ==
Brian Angelo began his DJ career in the late eighties. Between break dancing and playing basketball, he would stay up late, listening to the legends of that time. Some of the influences he was exposed to include Red Alert, Marley Marl, and Funkmaster Flex. Iroc was also influenced by DJs that he saw in concert, including Jazzy Jeff, Grandmaster Dee, and Master Flash. Iroc would study the work of other DJs, and try to mimic the scratches which he heard. Later, Iroc would be influenced by some of his peers such as Steve Dee, Roc Raida, Ron G, and Kid Capri.

In the late eighties and early nineties, mix tapes in New York City were becoming popular. Iroc fell in love with these mix tapes, and decided to release his own. By the release of his third mix tape people were taking notice of this young new DJ from the Bronx. As Iroc started to have success with his mix tapes he had a chance to meet many stars. In 1993, while in Harlem, Iroc ran into a future Hip-Hop legend Big L. This chance meeting led to a long career as a tour DJ in the music industry. Soon after they met, DJ Iroc started spinning for the young MC on international tours in Japan, Brazil, Germany, and London. Over the next 15 years, Iroc has performed with some of the biggest artists in the Hip-Hop world including: Puff Daddy, DMX, and Alicia Keys. His television appearances include music oriented shows such as Rap City, 106 & Park and MTV, talk shows such as the Late Show with David Letterman, Jimmy Kimmel Live!, and The Carson Daly Show, as well as an appearance at The Grammys with Alicia Keys. DJ Iroc also produces music, contributing to albums with Jay-Z, Sting, and B.I.G. DJ Iroc co-hosted and hosted radio shows on WAJZ, Jamz 96.3 FM from 2008 to 2019.

== Discography ==
=== Production ===
- 1997: Jay-Z "In My Lifetime, Vol. 1"
- 1997: Mase "Harlem World"
- 1998: Big Pun "Capital Punishment"
- 1998: L.O.X "Money, Power & Respect"
- 2000: Drag-On "Opposite of H2O"
