= Andrew Ballen =

American television producer (born 1973)

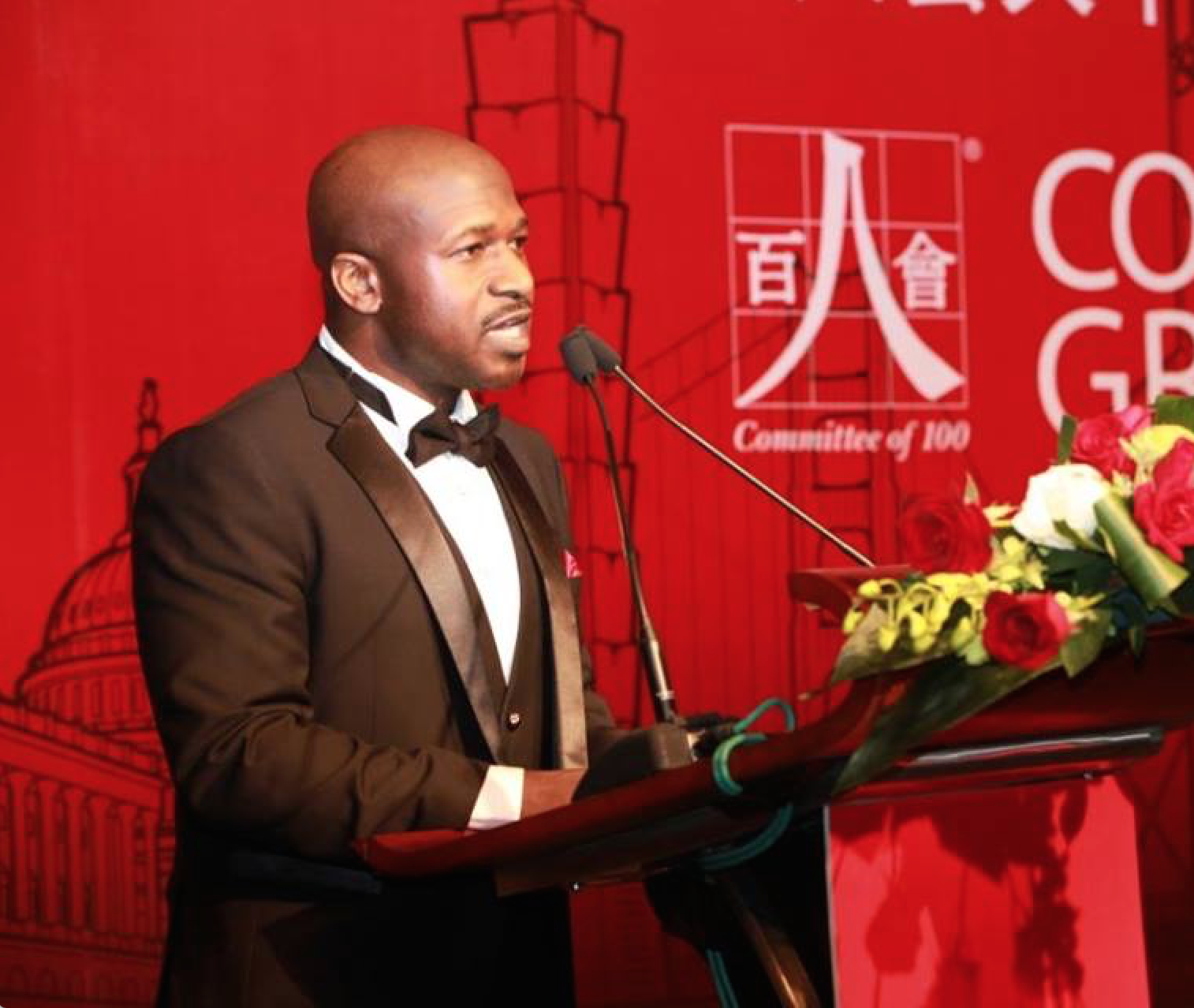
- Ballen in 2013
- Born: Andrew Craig Ballen; April 27, 1973 (age 53); New York City, US
- Education: The University of North Carolina at Chapel Hill
- Occupations: Founder AVD Digital Media, Ad and Marketing Executive, TV Host and Producer
- Years active: 2001–present

Andrew Craig Ballen (born April 27, 1973) is best known in China as Da Long (Chinese: 大龙), or Big Dragon. He is a familiar foreign face on Chinese TV, known for his role as host and producer of China's internationally broadcast travel series, Getaway. Ballen is the first American to produce, host, and syndicate his own TV series in China.

Founder of AVD Digital, headquartered in Shanghai, China, in 2014 Ballen and his team conceived and developed China's seminal interactive in-video touch advertising system, for which he was awarded two China invention patents in 2017.

Brands including Nike, Unilever, Kraft Foods, LVMH Group's Sephora, and Asian TV shopping platform Acorn International employed Ballen's system on a variety of digital campaigns. These in video TOUCH™ to buy mechanisms produced greater than 250% increases in viewer engagement relative to traditional online banner and pre-roll ads. Though patented, Ballen's TOUCH™ mechanism was later back-engineered and duplicated by several of China's larger government-backed online video platforms.

== Early life and education ==
Ballen was born in New York. The son of Belizean and Jamaican immigrants, he was raised by his father Patrick, a surgeon, and step-mother Naomi in Greensboro, North Carolina. Ballen attended Hargrave Military Academy, in Chatham, VA. During his Senior year, he became the first person of color in Academy history to become Battalion Commander, achieving the academy's highest rank. Ballen graduated with Honors in Political Science and International Relations at The University of North Carolina at Chapel Hill.

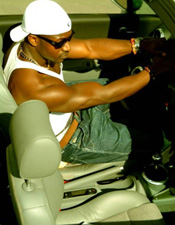
Ballen on China Travel Series Getaway, Dragon TV.

== Career ==
Ballen first arrived in Shanghai, China in August 2001.

Unable to speak a word of Chinese, Ballen taught himself Mandarin. Once fluent, he began making guest appearances on Shanghai Media Group televised programming and was subsequently named host of Shanghai Radio talk show "Live It Up Shanghai".

Initially, no sponsored advertising existed for Ballen's radio talk show, the same later being true for his TV Series Getaway. Viewing the China market as critical to the growth of Western brands, Ballen started his own company to attract global brands aiming to target affluent Chinese consumers. He has advocated for unintrusive digital ad messaging that does not disturb the viewing experience of digital natives. He frequently addresses the topic of interactive content-marketing and in 2014 coined the term "Audience ROI."

Ballen hosted the 2013 Committee of 100 Sino-American Cooperation conference where he gave an address on the state of Sino-US cultural and economic cooperation. Among the gala's keynote speakers was reformist Chairman of the People's Bank of China, Governor Zhou Xiaochuan.

=== Western Entertainment: a China marketing platform ===
Ballen pioneered the usage of Western entertainment as a marketing tool for US brands in China. As his broadcast programming and marketing gained notoriety, Ballen was featured in the fly-on-the-wall documentary No Sleep Til Shanghai. bringing to China for the first time the likes of Sean Kingston, Ice-T, Far East Movement, and MC Jin.

These successes served as a benchmark for the localization of Western brands in Shanghai, Beijing, and other Tier 1 Chinese cities. Ballen's China entertainment marketing success is a case study in the book, Business is War: The Unfinished Business of Black America by Darren J. Perkins.

=== Getaway ===
Ballen was the first American citizen to host and co-produce nationally broadcast TV content in China. His travel series, Getaway, aired across China from 2003 until 2014. On TV, Ballen toured China by car, visiting locals and exploring Chinese history, culture, and cuisine. Getaway appeared on China's Dragon TV and later was syndicated internationally on CCTV News.

=== 2008 Beijing Summer Olympics ===
In July 2008, as China hosted the Beijing Summer Olympics, Ballen was commissioned by Puma AG and the Government of Jamaica to execute Jamaica's Olympic media, marketing, and China public relations activities, including the marketing and event programming related to Jamaican track and field phenomenon, Usain Bolt. That summer, Ballen's company and partners were the only non-Governmental entities permitted to bring foreign performance artists to Beijing for non-IOC sanctioned event programming.

=== REMIX ===
In 2011, Ballen produced China's first-ever, bilingual, Sino-American reality series, REMIX, The judges for REMIX were American, Sean Kingston, Taiwanese recording artists, Jam Hsiao and Wilbur Pan. REMIX first winner was punk rock and ballad crooner, Ping An, now a highly acclaimed Chinese recording artist.

== Awards ==
In April 2015, Ballen was named to China's Digital A-List. an award recognizing China's top 100 digital entrepreneurs in the e-commerce, data, and advertising space. Jack Ma, founder of Alibaba Group, and Pony Ma, Chairman of Tencent were also named to 2015's Digital A-List.

In April 2016 Ballen was again named to Campaign Asia's List.

== Controversy ==
In a PBS interview with Tavis Smiley and Cornel West, Ballen remarked that while China's growth had helped lift 800 million people out of poverty, much of that growth had come at the expense of several million American manufacturing jobs.

== Notes ==
1. While widely known in China as Da Long (大龙), Ballen's formal Chinese name is Bo Dalong (博大龙).
