= Down Bottom =

1999 single by Drag-On featuring Juvenile

Single by Drag-On featuring Juvenile and Swizz Beatz

from the album Ryde or Die Vol. 1
- Released: August 1999
- Genre: Hip hop
- Length: 4:55
- Label: Interscope; Ruff Ryders
- Songwriters: Melvin Smalls; Terius Gray; Kasseem Dean
- Producer: Swizz Beatz

Drag-On singles chronology
"Ryde or Die" (1999)	"Down Bottom" (1999)	"Spit These Bars" (1999)

Juvenile singles chronology
"Ha" (1998)	"Down Bottom" (1999)	"Back That Azz Up" (1999)

Music video
- "Down Bottom" on YouTube

"Down Bottom" is a song by American rapper Drag-On featuring Juvenile. It is the fourth single from American record label Ruff Ryders Entertainment's compilation album Ryde or Die Vol. 1 (1999). An official remix featuring American rapper Yung Wun was also released, and the remix was used for the music video.

== Background ==
Juvenile did not appear on the song when it was released as a single, although he appeared on the album version. Drag-On stated the reason in an interview with RapReviews: "Some real political stuff, I ain't know what was goin' on. I kinda blame me for not being in-tune (with the business) so that's why now I'm really sellin' my music, and plus I'm more in tune with the business side."

In September 2023, it was revealed that at the time the song was created, Drag-On engaged in a rap battle with rapper Pitbull. Drag-On rapped a verse from "Down Bottom", which had not yet been released. Pitbull alleged that Drag-On was disqualified for using previously-written rhymes, making Pitbull the winner.

== Music video ==
A music video was made for the remix featuring Yung Wun. Solé, The LOX, Eve, Sean Cross & Infa-Red, and Gangsta Boo make cameo appearances.

== Critical reception ==
The song received generally positive reviews. John Bush of AllMusic cited "Down Bottom" as among the tracks from Ryde or Die, Vol. 1 with excellent production, praising its "New Orleans horns". Reviewing Ryde or Die, Vol. 1 for Rolling Stone, Kris Ex commented "At its best (the festive "Down Bottom"), the album is pure adrenalin". Mitch Findlay of HotNewHipHop wrote that "Drag-On set 'Down Bottom' off with a truly spectacular opening voice, effortlessly bodying the track in a manner unfamiliar to the modern single" and "Juvenile follows suit with a disparate style, bringing a laid-back yet undeniably menacing sense of charisma to the mix."

== Charts ==
Chart (1999)	Peak position
US Bubbling Under Hot 100 (Billboard)	18
US Hot R&B/Hip-Hop Songs (Billboard)	43
US Hot Rap Songs (Billboard)	5
