= Jigga My Nigga =

Single by Jay-Z

from the album Ryde or Die Vol. 1 and Vol. 3... Life and Times of S. Carter
- Released: May 28, 1999
- Recorded: 1998–1999
- Genre: East Coast hip-hop
- Length: 5:23
- Label: Ruff Ryders; Interscope; Roc-A-Fella; Def Jam
- Songwriters: Shawn Carter; Kasseem Dean
- Producer: Swizz Beatz

Jay-Z singles chronology
"Jigga What, Jigga Who (Originator 99)" (1999)	"Jigga My Nigga" (1999)	"Girl's Best Friend" (1999)

"Jigga My Nigga" (censored as "Jigga") is a single by Jay-Z from the Ruff Ryders Entertainment compilation Ryde or Die Vol. 1. It was released on May 28, 1999. It also appeared as a hidden track on Jay-Z's fourth album, Vol. 3... Life and Times of S. Carter, contained within the final track "Hova Song (Outro)". Produced by Swizz Beatz, it reached number 28 on the Billboard Hot 100. The song interpolates "Just You Just Me" by The Counts and "What's My Name?" by Snoop Dogg, using the line "what's my motherfuckin' name?". The beat was later remade for "Scenario 2000" by Eve featuring Ruff Ryders.

On the "Jigga My Nigga" CD single, three non-Jay-Z tracks are featured: Memphis Bleek's "Memphis Bleek Is...", Rell's "When You Will See" and Beanie Sigel's "What a Thug About".

== Formats and track listings ==
=== CD ===
1. "Jigga My Nigga (LP Version)" (5:23)
2. "Memphis Bleek Is... (LP Version)" (4:19)
3. "When You Will See (LP Version)" (4:47)
4. "What a Thug About (LP Version)" (4:36)

=== Vinyl ===
A-side

1. "Jigga My Nigga (Radio Edit)" (3:50)
2. "Jigga My Nigga (LP Version)" (5:23)
3. "Jigga My Nigga (Instrumental)"

B-side

1. "What a Thug About (Radio Edit)"
2. "What a Thug About (LP Version)"
3. "What a Thug About (TV track)"

== Charts ==
=== Weekly charts ===
Chart (1999)	Peak position
US Billboard Hot 100	28
US Hot R&B/Hip-Hop Songs (Billboard)	6
US Hot Rap Songs (Billboard)	1
US Rhythmic Airplay (Billboard)	31

=== Year-end charts ===
Chart (1999)	Position
US Hot R&B/Hip-Hop Songs (Billboard)	44

== See also ==
- List of songs recorded by Jay-Z
