= Learn Chinese (song) =

Single by Jin featuring Wyclef Jean

from the album The Rest Is History
- Released: December 2, 2003
- Recorded: 2003
- Genre: Hip hop
- Length: 4:33
- Label: Ruff Ryders; Virgin
- Songwriters: Au-Yeung; Wyclef Jean; Jerry Duplessis; James Brown; Charles Bobbitt; Fred Wesley
- Producers: Wyclef Jean; Jerry "Wonda" Duplessis

Jin singles chronology
"Learn Chinese" (2003)	"So Afraid/Senorita" (2004)

Wyclef Jean singles chronology
"Party to Damascus" (2003)	"Learn Chinese" (2003)	"Take Me As I Am" (2004)

"Learn Chinese" is the first single released from Jin's debut album The Rest Is History. The song features Wyclef Jean, who produced and co-wrote the track along with Jerry Duplessis. At first, the song was a buzz song. But, later, it turned into the first single for Jin's debut album due to its success. This single has been said to be Jin's signature song. To date the single is still Jin's most successful song and single in his music career. The single was featured on an episode of The Andy Milonakis Show. It went gold in China and was high at one point in the US but never achieved gold success there.

"Learn Chinese" contains samples from James Brown's "Blind Man Can See It"; it also contains elements of Yellowman's "Mr. Chin". The song has background vocals from Ayeesha.

== Track lists and formats ==
CD

1. "Learn Chinese" (4:06)
2. "Little Hungry" (3:52)
3. "Check the Clock" (5:43)
4. "Learn Chinese" (Video)

2-track promo CD

1. "Learn Chinese" (Radio Edit) (4:04)
2. "Learn Chinese" (Instrumental) (4:30)

5-inch single

1. "Learn Chinese" (4:06)
2. "Little Hungry" (3:52)
3. "Check the Clock" (5:43)
4. "Learn Chinese" [Multimedia Track]

12-inch single

A-side

1. "Learn Chinese" (Radio Edit) (4:04)
2. "Learn Chinese" (Explicit Version) (4:32)

B-side

1. "Learn Chinese" (Instrumental) (4:30)
2. "Learn Chinese" (Acapella [Clean]) (4:27)

== Music video ==
The music video for "Learn Chinese" was shot in Washington DC's Chinatown, using the Friendship gate as a backdrop. The video featured Wyclef Jean and Ayeesha. The video also had a cameo appearance by rapper Yung Mac. In the video Jin plays two characters: one who looks like a mob boss; the other, a normal Chinese food delivery employee. It starts with a man tired of delivering Chinese food who is then hit by a car. A woman then helps him up but at the same time, a mob boss is seen on his way to a restaurant. The guy notices an Asian woman getting kidnapped, the same woman who helped him up after he got hit by the car. He chases the mob boss and his crew, but is caught by the mob boss' body guards. He then is confronted by the mob boss. He manages to get away and is led to a karate lesson. He gets through them and gets the Asian woman out of there. They get out of the restaurant and are confronted again with the mob boss and his crew. Knowing he is out matched, he still begins to fight them. Just before the fighting begins, the video switches to a "To be continued.." screen.

== Charts ==
Chart (2003–04)	Peak position
Australia (ARIA)	40
Australian Urban (ARIA)	14
U.S. Billboard Hot R&B/Hip-Hop Songs	74
UK Singles Chart	59
