= Todd Angkasuwan =

Thai-American music video and documentary film director

Todd Angkasuwan is a Thai-American music video and documentary film director.

== Biography ==
Angkasuwan grew up in Riverside, California and has been making films since he was 9 years old. After college, he worked as a television news reporter for ABC, CBS and Fox. In 2005, he left his career in journalism to pursue filmmaking.

In the 2006 film No Sleep Til Shanghai (Raptivism/Imperial/Caroline/EMI), Angkasuwan follows rapper Jin Au-Yeung, the first Asian American signed to a major hip-hop label, on an eight-city tour of Asia. The film documents the experiences of Jin and his entourage in visiting cities like Shanghai, Tokyo, Taipei and Singapore for the first time. The film screened to a sold out audience at the 2006 San Francisco International Asian American Film Festival, where it was nominated for Best Documentary. It was also nominated for Best Documentary at the 2005 Atlanta Hip Hop Film Festival.

Angkasuwan has written for AllHipHop and cites Stanley Kubrick, Wong Kar-wai, Michel Gondry, Hype Williams and David Fincher as influences.

== Music videos ==
His directing work includes music videos for artists including:

2005

- Jin - "Top 5 (Dead or Alive)"

2006

- The Society of Invisibles - "Watching You"
- Anglo-Saxon - "This Old House"
- Roscoe Umali featuring E-40 - "Live It Up"
- Move.meant - "Good Money"
- Move.meant - "Higher (Breathe)"
- Chan - "Lonely Road"
- Jin - "F.Y.I."/"100 Grand Jin"
- Far*East Movement - "Holla Hey"
- The Society of Invisibles - "Hack Pack"
- Strong Arm Steady feat. Talib Kweli - "One Step"
- Far*East Movement - "Smile"

2007

- Joell Ortiz - "125 Grams"
- Chan - "Street Legends"
- Jin - "ABC"
- Mitchy Slick - "Ain't My Fault"
- KRS-One featuring Marley Marl - "Hip Hop Lives"
- Bizarre - "Fat Boy"
- Styles P feat. Swizz Beatz - "Blow Ya Mind"

2008

- Vox Merger - "Reasons"
- AZ - "Undeniable"
- Sheek Louch - "Good Love"
- Far*East Movement featuring Baby Bash and Lil Rob - "You've Got a Friend"
- RZA feat. Inspectah Deck - "Can't Stop Me Now"
- Wale & Justice - "W.A.L.E.D.A.N.C.E."
- Snoop Dogg/Akshay Kumar/RDB - "Singh Is King"
- Slow Pain - "OG Love"
- DMX - "Already" (Unreleased)
- Ese Daz - "She's Got It"
- RZA feat. Monk & Thea - "Drama"
- Snoop Dogg - "Staxxx in My Jeans"
- Lil Rob - "Let Me Come Back"

2009

- DJ Revolution ft. Kbimean - "Man Or Machine"
- UGK - "Da Game Been Good To Me"
- B-Real ft. Damian Marley - "Fire"
- Reflection Eternal (Talib Kweli & Hi-Tek) - "Back Again"
- Tash - "New Bikini"
- KRS-One & Buckshot - "Robot"
- Marco Polo & Torae - "Double Barrel"
- Skyzoo - "Popularity"
- KRS-One & Buckshot - "Survival Skills"
- Raheem Devaughn ft. Ludacris - "Bulletproof"
- The Dares - "It's Your World"

2010

- Soulja Boy Tell'em - "2 Milli"
- RZA feat. Kinetic - "You Must Be Dreaming"
- Marco Polo & Ruste Juxx - "Nobody"
- B. Taylor ft. Ray J - "Get This Party Started"
- T-Pain ft. Rick Ross - "Rap Song"

2011

- Travis Porter - "Bring It Back"
- Pharoahe Monch feat. Idris Elba - "The Warning"
- Random Axe - "The Hex"
- Random Axe - "Random Call"
- Black Rob - "Celebration"
- Black Rob - "Showin Up"
- Self Scientific - "God's Language"
- Evidence - "You"
- Evidence - "It Wasn't Me"
- DJ Cosla & Tribeca - "The World's Best"
- Statik Selektah ft. Lecrae - "Live and Let Live"
- Statik Selektah ft. Big K.R.I.T. & Freddie Gibbs - "Play The Game"

2012

- Big K.R.I.T. - "I Got This"
- Evidence - "Falling Down"
- Traphik & Dyme-A-Duzin - "Fly Young Gentlemen"
- Traphik ft. Tori Kelly - "Magnetic"
- Kottonmouth Kings - "Hold It In"
- Jin - "Brand New Me"
- MURS & Fashawn - "Slash Gordan"
- Brother Ali - "Mourning in America"
- Chris Webby ft. Bun B & Kid Ink - "Wait A Minute"

2013

- DJ Cosla & Tribeca - "Battle Tested"
- Sean Price - "Genesis of the Omega"
- Sean Price ft. Pharoahe Monch - "BBQ Sauce"

2014

- Mickey Avalon - "Hollywood"
- Marco Polo ft Talib Kweli - "G.U.R.U."
- Kap G ft. Wiz Khalifa & Kirko Bangz - "Tatted Like Amigos"
- Thaitanium ft. Snoop Dogg - "WAKE UP (Bangkok City)"

2015

- R.A. the Rugged Man - "Shoot Me In The Head" never released or finished by director
- Thaitanium ft. Coga - "Sukebe"

== Films ==
- No Sleep Til Shanghai (2007)
