= Vol. 4: The Redemption =

Compilation album by Ruff Ryders
- Released: July 26, 2005
- Recorded: 2004–2005
- Genre: Hip-hop
- Length: 1:08:40
- Label: Ruff Ryders; Artemis
- Producer: Akon; Almighty; Antonio Simmons; DJ Green Lantern; Elite; Ike Dirty; Jelly Roll; LV; Mr. Devine; Neo Da Matrix; Notty; Scott Storch; SPKilla; Steve Skinner; Swizz Beatz

Ruff Ryders chronology
Ryde or Die Vol. 3: In the "R" We Trust (2001)	Vol. 4: The Redemption (2005)	Ruff Ryders: Past, Present, Future (2011)

Professional ratings
Review scores
Source	Rating
AllMusic	3.5/5 stars
HipHopDX	2/5
RapReviews	5/10

Vol. 4: The Redemption is the fourth compilation album by American hip-hop record label Ruff Ryders Entertainment. It was released on July 26, 2005 via Artemis Records.

Production was handled by Mr. Devine, Swizz Beatz, Akon, Almighty, Antonio Simmons, DJ Green Lantern, Elite, Jelly Roll, LV, Neo Da Matrix, Notty, Scott Storch, SPK, Ike Dirty and Steve Skinner.

It features contributions from the L.O.X., Infa-Red, Kartoon, Cross, Flashy, DMX, Drag-On, Chocolate Ty, Snypah, Bunny Wailer, Pirate, Noreaga, Scarlett, Aja Smith, Akon, Cassidy, Jin, J-Hood, and LT.

The album debuted at number 40 on the Billboard 200, selling 24,949 copies in first week (total sold 43,318).

== Track listing ==
No.	Title	Writer(s)	Producer(s)	Length
1.	"Ruff Ryders 4 Life" (The Lox)	Jason Phillips; David Styles; Sean Jacobs; Loren Lunnon	Mr. Devine	4:17
2.	"If It's Beef..." (Jadakiss, Kartoon, Infa-Red and Flashy)	Phillips; Terrell Franklin; Shandel Green; F. Neal; Quaadir Atkinson	Neo Da Matrix	5:01
3.	"Knock Knock" (Chocolate Ty and Drag-On)	Tyrone Williamson; Melvin Smalls; Antonio Simmons	Antonio Simmons; Shizz (co.)	3:42
4.	"What They Want" (Infa-Red and Cross)	Green; Shawn Martin; Kasseem Dean	Swizz Beatz	3:26
5.	"Ghetto Children" (Infa-Red, Cross, Styles P, Snypah and Bunny Wailer)	Green; Martin; Styles; Junior Ricketts; Neville O'Riley Livingston; Levar Coppin	LV; Sean C (co.)	3:16
6.	"Dame Reggaeton" (Skit)			1:38
7.	"Dame Reggaeton" (Pirate and Noreaga)	Alejandro Cintron; Victor Santiago; Edwin Almonte	SPK	4:03
8.	"What Ryders Do" (Scarlett, Kartoon and Aja)	Franklin; I. Ingram; Aja Smith; Lunnon; Oshea Hunter; Bernard Grobman	Mr. Devine; Oshea Hunter (co.); Bernard Grobman (co.)	4:26
9.	"Stay Down" (Flashy and Akon)	Neal; Aliaune Thiam	Akon	4:12
10.	"Get Wild" (DMX, Jadakiss, Kartoon and Flashy)	Earl Simmons; Phillips; Franklin; T. Smith; Scott Storch	Scott Storch	3:12
11.	"Blood in the Streets" (Kartoon)	Franklin; David Drew	Jelly Roll	3:25
12.	"Stupid Bitch" (Aja Smith)	A. Smith; Garnet Walters; Grobman; Anthony Parrino	Elite	3:25
13.	"Aim 4 the Head" (Cassidy, Jin and J-Hood)	Barry Reese; Jin Au-Yeung; Joshua Hood; Dean	Swizz Beatz	3:37
14.	"Throw It Up" (Drag-On)	Smalls; Kevin Bullock; Atkinson	Almighty Aziz; Neo Da Matrix (co.)	3:09
15.	"Keep the Gunz Cocked (If It's Beef... Remix)" (Jadakiss, Kartoon, Infa-Red and Flashy)	Phillips; Franklin; Green; Neal; Atkinson; James D'Agostino	DJ Green Lantern	5:29
16.	"Dale Poppi Dale" (Pirate)	Cintron; R. Rodriguez; Miguel Pabon	Notty	3:14
17.	"100 Bars of Crack" (Flashy)	Neal; Isaac Hayes III	Ike Dirty	5:40
18.	"So Serious" (LT)	Lynne Timmes; Steve Skinner; Arnie Roman	Steve Skinner; Arnie Roman (co.)	3:39
Total length:				1:08:40

Sample credits

- "Ghetto Children" contains sampled elements from "Armageddon", written and performed by Bunny Wailer.

== Charts ==
Chart (2005)	Peak position
US Billboard 200	40
US Top R&B/Hip-Hop Albums (Billboard)	15
US Independent Albums (Billboard)	5
