= Ryde or Die Vol. 3: In the "R" We Trust =

Ryde or Die Vol. 3

Compilation album by Ruff Ryders
- Released: December 18, 2001
- Recorded: 2000–2001
- Genre: Hip hop
- Length: 65:25
- Label: Ruff Ryders; Interscope
- Producer: Swizz Beatz, Jay "Icepick" Jackson, Timbaland, Brian Kidd, P.K., Irv Gotti, A Kid Called Roots, David Banner, Needlz, Mr. Devine, Roc Star (co.), Uncle Ralph (co.), Mike City

Ruff Ryders chronology
Ryde or Die Vol. 2 (2000)	Ryde or Die Vol. 3 (2001)	Vol. 4: The Redemption (2005)

Professional ratings
Review scores
Source	Rating
Allmusic	3/5 stars
HipHopDX.com	3/5 stars

Ryde or Die Vol. 3: In the "R" We Trust is a compilation album from American hip hop record label Ruff Ryders Entertainment, released on December 18, 2001. The album was certified gold by Music Canada in August 2002 for sales of 50,000 units.

== Track listing ==
Credits adapted from the album's liner notes.

No.	Title	Writer(s)	Producer(s)	Length
1.	"Intro" (Swizz Beatz)		Swizz Beatz; Jay "Icepick" Jackson	1:47
2.	"Dirrty" (Drag-On & Petey Pablo)	Melvin Smalls; Moses Barrett III; Brian Kidd	Brian Kidd	4:42
3.	"They Ain't Ready" (Jadakiss & Bubba Sparxxx)	Jason Phillips; Warren Mathis; Timothy Mosley; Lawrence Parker; Scott La Rock	Timbaland	4:21
4.	"U, Me & She" (Eve)	Eve Jeffers; Irving Lorenzo; James Mtume	Irv Gotti	3:53
5.	"Cali Love" (skit) (Swizz Beatz & Icepick)		Jay "Icepick" Jackson	1:54
6.	"Eastside Ryders" (Holiday Styles & Tha Eastsidaz)	David Styles; Keiwan Spillman; Tracy Davis; Patrick Lawrence	A Kid Called Roots	4:11
7.	"Rock Bottom" (Fiend)	Richard Jones Jr.; Lavell Crump	David Banner	3:32
8.	"We Don't Give a Fuck" (Drag-On & Fiend)	Smalls; Khari Cain; Jones Jr.; Jay Jackson	Needlz	4:16
9.	"Some South Shit" (Fiend, Ludacris & Yung Wun)	Jones Jr.; Christopher Bridges; James Anderson; Jackson; Kasseem Dean	Swizz Beatz	3:28
10.	"Street Team" (Infa-Red, Cross & Drag-On)	Shandel Green; Shawn Martin; Smalls; Anthony Fields	P.K.	4:23
11.	"Put It In Your Hole" (skit) (Icepick & Roc Star)		Jay "Icepick" Jackson; Roc Star (co.); Uncle Ralph (co.)	2:14
12.	"Shoot 'em In Tha Head" (Holiday Styles)	Styles; Fields	P.K.	3:42
13.	"Keep Hustlin'" (The L.O.X.)	Phillips; Sean Jacobs; Styles; Loren Lunnon	Mr. Devine	3:54
14.	"Gonna Be Sumthin'" (Infa-Red, Cross & Aja)	Green; Martin; Cain; Jackson	Needlz	4:06
15.	"Friend of Mine" (DMX)	Earl Simmons; Fields	P.K.	4:39
16.	"Can't Let Go" (bonus track) (Parlé)	Michael Flowers	Mike City	3:35
17.	"Ruff Ryders All-Star Freestyle" (bonus track) (The L.O.X., Shizlansky, Keem, Lotto, Rockstar & Cassidy)		Swizz Beatz	6:47

Leftover Tracks

- "We Gonna Make It Remix" Styles feat. Jadakiss and Eve

Notes

- "Rock Bottom" contains background vocals by McAfee.
- "Shoot 'em In Tha Head" does not appear on the clean version of the album.

Samples

- "They Ain't Ready" contains a portion of the composition "Remix for P Is Free", written by Lawrence Parker and Scott La Rock.
- "U, Me & She" contains a portion of the composition "You, Me and He", written by James Mtume.

== Charts ==
=== Weekly charts ===
Chart (2001–02)	Peak position
US Billboard 200	34
US Top R&B/Hip-Hop Albums (Billboard)	9

=== Year-end charts ===
Chart (2002)	Position
Canadian R&B Albums (Nielsen SoundScan)	79
Canadian Rap Albums (Nielsen SoundScan)	40
US Billboard 200	186
US Top R&B/Hip-Hop Albums (Billboard)	57
