= Hell and Back (album) =

Studio album by Drag-On
- Released: February 10, 2004
- Recorded: 2001–2003
- Genre: East Coast hip hop
- Length: 58:57
- Label: Ruff Ryders; Virgin
- Producer: Swizz Beatz; Rockwilder; Tuneheadz; Mr. Devine; Neo da Matrix; Needlz

Drag-On chronology
Opposite of H2O (2000)	Hell and Back (2004)

Hell and Back is the second studio album by rapper Drag-On. Originally scheduled for a September 16, 2003 release, the album was ultimately released February 10, 2004. It was released through Virgin Records and Ruff Ryders and featured production from the likes of Swizz Beatz and Rockwilder. Hell and Back was not as successful as his previous album, only peaking at number 47 on the Billboard 200, however it did fare better on the Top R&B/Hip-Hop Albums, peaking at number 5. The album featured one music video, for the song "Feel My Pain".

== Commercial performance ==
Hell and Back debuted and peaked at number 47 on the Billboard 200, with first week sales nearing 37,000 units.

== Critical reception ==
Professional ratings
Review scores
Source	Rating
AllMusic	2/5 stars
Rolling Stone	2/5 stars
Vibe	3/5 stars

AllMusic editor Andy Kellman found the album to be lackluster compared to Opposite of H2O, criticizing the producers and Drag-On's label mates for crafting uninspired beats and lyrics. Jon Caramanica, writing for Rolling Stone, commended Drag-On for emulating DMX's world-weary flow and fine-tuning his lyricism but felt that he squandered it when either compared to the album's guest artists or delivering generic party tracks. Vibe writer Laura Checkoway praised the combination of Drag-On's vocal delivery over idiosyncratic production and his attempts at lyrical growth on "My First Child" and "Life Is Short", despite diverting away from that established blueprint, concluding that "Hell and Back is still a trip worthwhile."

== Track listing ==
No.	Title	Writer(s)	Producer(s)	Length
1.	"Intro"			0:22
2.	"Feel My Pain"	Melvin Smalls; Franklin Crum; Eriberio Serrano	Tuneheadz	2:58
3.	"Bang Bang Boom" (featuring Swizz Beatz)	Smalls; Kasseem Dean; Thomas Allen; Harold Ray Brown; Morris Dickerson; Lonnie Jordan; Lee Oskar Levitin; Charles Miller; Howard E. Scott	Swizz Beatz	4:22
4.	"Bronx (skit)" (featuring Okre Boy, Bar, Haze and Neo)		Neo	1:33
5.	"Respect My Gangsta" (featuring Styles P)	Smalls; David Styles; Loren Lunnon	Mr. Devine	4:01
6.	"Tell Your Friends" (featuring Jadakiss)	Smalls; Jason Phillips; Quaadir Atkinson; Leonard Green	Neo	3:48
7.	"Put Your Drinks Down"	Smalls; Khari Cain; Shandel Green; Sean Martin; Earl Hayes	Needlz	3:54
8.	"Hector the Killer MC (skit)" (featuring Capone)		Neo	1:45
9.	"Trouble"	Smalls; Leroy Austin; Osei Moreland	Leroy "Tony" Austin; Osei Moreland	3:50
10.	"I'm a Ryder" (featuring Baby and TQ)	Smalls; Mickey Davis; Bryan Williams; Terrence Quaites	Black Key	4:33
11.	"Let's Get Crazy" (featuring DMX)	Smalls; Earl Simmons; Dana Stinson	Rockwilder	3:27
12.	"Busta (skit)" (featuring Capone)		Neo	1:11
13.	"U Had Me" (featuring Eve)	Smalls; Eve Jeffers; Sheldon Harris	Teflon	4:17
14.	"Holla at Your Boy"	Smalls; Eddie White; Carole King; Toni Stern	Dom Flava	3:13
15.	"My First Child"	Smalls; Jerry Stokes; Allen Travis	Jerry Stokes	3:40
16.	"It's a Party"	Smalls; Brian Palmer; Sergio Moore	Lilz; PLX	4:29
17.	"Life Is Short"	Smalls; Anthony Fields	P.K.	3:26
18.	"U Had Me (Part II)" (featuring Eve and Aja Smith)	Smalls; Jeffers; Aja Smith; Crum; Serrano	Tuneheadz	4:04

Sample credits

- "Bang Bang Boom" contains samples from "Nappy Head (Theme from Ghetto Man)", written by Thomas Allen, Harold Ray Brown, Morris Dickerson, Lonnie Jordan, Lee Oskar Levitin, Charles Miller, and Howard E. Scott; and performed by WAR.
- "Holla at Your Boy" contains excerpts from "It's Too Late", written by Carole King and Toni Stern, and performed by Billy Paul.

== Charts ==
=== Weekly charts ===
Chart (2004)	Peak position
US Billboard 200	47
US Top R&B/Hip-Hop Albums (Billboard)	5

=== Year-end charts ===
Chart (2004)	Position
US Top R&B/Hip-Hop Albums (Billboard)	93
