= Brand New Me (EP) =

Brand New Me EP

Studio album by MC Jin
- Released: December 11, 2012
- Genre: Hip hop; Pop; East Coast hip hop
- Label: Catch Music Group LLC
- Producer: Fresh N Famous; STA; Velly

MC Jin chronology
Sincerely Yours (EP) (2011)	Brand New Me EP (2012)

Brand New Me EP is the second EP from Chinese-American rapper MC Jin. It was released on December 11, 2012 under Catch Music Group.

== Track listing ==
No.	Title	Producer(s)	Length
1.	"Brand New Me"	Fresh N Famous	3:46
2.	"Going Places" (featuring Christina K)	STA	4:08
3.	"Number 1" (featuring ZG)		3:07
4.	"Apology" (featuring Joseph Vincent)	Velly	3:18
5.	"State Of Mind" (featuring Christina K)	Velly	4:19
6.	"Feel Good" (featuring Toestah & Joseph Vincent)	Velly	4:04
Total length:			22:41
