= Opposite of H2O =

Studio album by Drag-On
- Released: March 28, 2000
- Genre: East Coast hip-hop, gangsta rap, hardcore hip-hop
- Length: 62:57
- Label: Interscope; Ruff Ryders
- Producer: Swizz Beatz

Drag-On chronology
Opposite of H2O (2000)	Hell and Back (2004)

Opposite of H2O is the debut studio album by American rapper Drag-On. Originally scheduled for a January 25, 2000 release, it was ultimately released on March 28, 2000, through Interscope Records and Ruff Ryders. It was produced by Swizz Beatz, DJ Iroc, and P.K., among others. Critical reception of the album was mixed.

== Critical reception ==
Professional ratings
Review scores
Source	Rating
AllMusic	3/5 stars
The Encyclopedia of Popular Music	3/5 stars
Entertainment Weekly	C+
RapReviews	5/10
Rolling Stone	3/5 stars
The Source	2.5/5 stars

Rolling Stone wrote that "on the darker songs, [Drag-On's] monotone rides stealthily over the album's dismal grooves, casting a morbid spell, and, ironically, when he and DMX actually collaborate, on the invigorating 'Get It Right', Drag more than holds his own."

== Commercial performance ==
Opposite of H2O debuted and peaked at number 5 on the Billboard top 200 and number 2 on the Top R&B/Hip-Hop Albums, with first week sales of over 150,000 copies. It spent 14 weeks on the Billboard 200 before leaving the chart. The album has been certified Gold by the Recording Industry Association of America (RIAA) for selling over 500,000 copies in America.

== Track listing ==
Credits adapted from the album's liner notes.

No.	Title	Writer(s)	Producer(s)	Length
1.	"Parental Advisory (Intro)"		Icepick Jay	0:41
2.	"Opposite of H2O" (featuring Jadakiss)	Mel Smalls; David Styles; Darrin Dean; Kasseem Dean	Swizz Beatz	3:41
3.	"Spit These Bars" (featuring Swizz Beatz)	Smalls; K. Dean; Michael Gomez	DJ Shok	3:43
4.	"Groundhog's Day"	Smalls; Anthony Fields	P. Killer Trackz	3:15
5.	"High Roller (skit)"		Icepick Jay; Swizz Beatz (co.); Sye (co.)	1:08
6.	"Niggas Die 4 Me" (featuring DMX)	Smalls; Earl Simmons; K. Dean	Swizz Beatz	3:52
7.	"Here We Go" (featuring Eve)	Smalls; Eve Jeffers; D. Dean; Fields	P. Killer Trackz	3:54
8.	"Snipe Out"	Smalls; David Starr	David Starr	3:48
9.	"Click, Click, Clack" (featuring P. Killer Trackz)	Smalls; Fields	P. Killer Trackz	3:26
10.	"Get It Right" (featuring DMX)	Smalls; Simmons; K. Dean	Swizz Beatz	3:42
11.	"Shaquita (skit)" (featuring Capone)		Icepick Jay	0:52
12.	"Ladies 2000"	Smalls; Sheldon Harris	Teflon	4:27
13.	"Drag Shit" (featuring Styles P)	Smalls; Styles; D. Dean; K. Dean	Swizz Beatz	3:22
14.	"Ready For War" (featuring The Lox)	Smalls; Jason Phillips; Sean Jacobs; Styles; Brian Angelo; D. Dean	DJ Iroc	3:57
15.	"Hot Dick (skit)"		Icepick Jay; Grimmy (co.)	1:00
16.	"The Way Life Is" (featuring Case)	Smalls; Jay Jackson; K. Dean	Swizz Beatz	4:55
17.	"Pop It" (featuring Icepick Jay)	Smalls; Jackson; K. Dean	Swizz Beatz	4:14
18.	"What's It All About?" (featuring Parlé)	Smalls; D. Dean; K. Dean	Swizz Beatz	4:53
19.	"Life Goes On" (Bonus Track)	Smalls; K. Dean; Gomez	Swizz Beatz; DJ Shok	3:37

== Charts ==
=== Weekly charts ===
Chart (2000)	Peak position
US Billboard 200	5
US Top R&B/Hip-Hop Albums (Billboard)	2

=== Year-end charts ===
Chart (2000)	Position
US Billboard 200	179
US Top R&B/Hip-Hop Albums (Billboard)	65

== Certifications ==
Region	Certification	Certified units/sales
United States (RIAA)	Gold	500,000^{^}
^{^} Shipments figures based on certification alone.
