= NBA Ballers: Phenom =

2006 video game

- Developer: Midway
- Publisher: Midway Home Entertainment
- Series: NBA Ballers
- Engine: RenderWare
- Platforms: PlayStation 2, Xbox
- Release: NA: March 31, 2006
- Genre: Sports (basketball)
- Modes: Single player, Multiplayer

NBA Ballers: Phenom is a basketball video game for the PlayStation 2 and Xbox. It is the sequel to NBA Ballers, which featured Stephon Marbury and Chauncey Billups. In this game, celebrities such as MC Jin, Ludacris, Hot Sauce, and Trikz can be played. The main story is based on the friendship between the player and Hot Sauce. One day, Hot Sauce signs up for a one-man street baller organization and steals the player's girlfriend. The gamer must then get back at him by showing off his streetball skills. The game features four divided sections of Los Angeles: Hollywood, Santa Monica, Beverly Hills and Los Angeles International Airport. Phenom expands on the customization from the first game. Now there are 20,000 customization combinations, with options including haircuts, headgear, tops, bottoms, shoes, jewelry, backpacks, knee pads, elbow pads, watches, shoes, and glasses. The game also introduces the ability for the player to create their own court. An extra disc containing the soundtrack comes with the game.

== Story ==
The story mode feature in NBA Ballers: Phenom is the game's main feature. The player creates a custom character and can choose from a variety of customizations such as height, age, body type, position and more. The story is built around the created player, the Phenom, and his rivalry with former friend Philip "Hot Sauce" Champion. After Hot Sauce convinces the scouts that he and you are indeed a one-man show, Hot Sauce being the one man. Not only does he steal your glory but he steals your girlfriend too. It's NBA Finals week and you are setting out to prove just how good you are. With the million dollars and NBA's number 1 draft position or a lucrative entrepreneur empire up for offer, you must do whatever it takes to become the best. The main games are played in Tournament style the same as NBA Ballers. There are 4 locations in which you can compete in Tournaments. You can go back to your hotel when you are not competing in an event, where you can save the game, exit the game, continue the game, modify your baller and design your mansion. Two of the locations (Beverly Hills and Venice Beach) are explorable. You can walk around the town doing numerous tasks such as collecting the hidden diamonds, play Peja's Hot Hoops and you can talk to certain people and do tasks for them resulting in a generous reward and there is even a ticket stand where you can buy tickets to participate in certain events such as the Freestyle Rap Battle with Jin.

GAMEPLAY

The normal 1-on-1 half court gameplay was kept intact from the previous game. However, Phenom introduces 2-on-2 mode, which somewhat mimics the gameplay of NBA Jam as games are played on a full court with two ballers on both teams.

NBA Ballers: Phenom supports multiplayer. The game had support for up to 2 players online and up to 4 players split screen.

== Reception ==
Reception

Aggregate score
| Aggregator | Score | |
| Aggregator | PS2 | Xbox |
|---|---|---|
| Metacritic | 69/100 | 70/100 |

Review scores
| Publication | Score | |
| Publication | PS2 | Xbox |
|---|---|---|
| Electronic Gaming Monthly | 6.67/10 | 6.67/10 |
| Game Informer | 7.75/10 | 7.75/10 |
| GamePro | 3/5 | N/A |
| GameRevolution | C− | C− |
| GameSpot | 7.2/10 | 7.5/10 |
| GameSpy | 3/5 | 3/5 |
| GameTrailers | 7.6/10 | 7.6/10 |
| GameZone | N/A | 8/10 |
| IGN | 7.9/10 | 7.9/10 |
| Official U.S. PlayStation Magazine | 4/5 | N/A |
| Official Xbox Magazine (US) | N/A | 8/10 |

The game received "average" reviews on both platforms according to the review aggregation website Metacritic.
