= Bloodline Records =

- Founded: 2001
- Founder: Earl "DMX" Simmons
- Defunct: 2021
- Status: Defunct
- Genre: Hip hop, R&B
- Country of origin: United States
- Location: New York City, New York

Bloodline Records was an American hip hop record label, founded by rapper DMX. Bloodline was founded in early 2001 and was under a distribution deal with Def Jam Recordings. In 2006, DMX parted ways with Def Jam and Bloodline became an independent imprint. The label went defunct in 2021 following DMX's death.

== History ==
The label was founded by DMX in 2001, following the commercial success he had with Def Jam Recordings. His first signees were Iceberg (now known as Hitmaka), Loose Cannon and Big Stan. Bloodline acquired Big Stan from Ruff Ryders after Big Stan's deal with Ruff Ryders fell through with no album released.

Iceberg left Bloodline in late 2001 at the request of his parents, who later sent the 16-year-old to military school as punishment for pursuing a rap career. Kashmir joined Bloodline in 2002. Loose Cannon, who appeared on It's Dark & Hell Is Hot, got into a dispute with DMX when he used a recycle verse, previously recorded by Cannon for "Where the Hood At?". He then left the label in early 2004. Bazaar Royale signed with Bloodline in a distribution deal with Koch Records (known today as MNRK Music Group), but was dropped in 2007.

In September 2003, DMX released his fifth studio album, Grand Champ. Though the album was not released through Bloodline, it featured two guest appearances from Big Stan and production from new Bloodline in-house producer Mac-G.

In 2006, Kashmir (known simply as Kash) left the label to pursue a solo career. Big Stan also left Bloodline the following year in 2007 to launch his own label, Live Young Die Rich Entertainment. He maintained in a YouTube interview that he and DMX had been on good terms during and after Stan's departure.

Once Def Jam dropped DMX in 2006, Bloodline lost their partnership with the label; the only album released under the Bloodline/Def Jam deal with the soundtrack to 2003's Cradle 2 the Grave. Since that, the label went idle.

On April 9, 2021, founder DMX died of drug-related heart attack at the age of 50, putting an end to the Bloodline imprint permanently. However, the final album to be released under Bloodline was DMX's posthumous album, Exodus, his planned comeback album and his first on Def Jam after eighteen years of departure, which was released in May, almost over a month after his death.

== Artists ==
- DMX (deceased)
- Yung Berg
- Kashmir
- Big Stan
- Bazaar Royale
- Word One

== In-house producers ==
- Mac G
- DMX

== See also ==
- List of record labels
- Ruff Ryders Entertainment
