= Ryde or Die Vol. 1 =

Compilation album by Ruff Ryders
- Released: April 27, 1999
- Recorded: 1998
- Studios: Platinum Island Studios (New York, NY); Powerhouse Recording Studios (New York, NY); Festival Studios (New Orleans, LA); Soundworks Recording Studio (New York, NY); DMH Studios (New York, NY)
- Genre: Hip-hop
- Length: 54:03
- Labels: Ruff Ryders; Interscope
- Producers: Dave "Jam" Hall; DJ Clue?; Jay "Icepick" Jackson; Joaquin "Waah" Dean; Ken "Duro" Ifill; P. Killer Trackz; Swizz Beatz

Ruff Ryders chronology
| Ryde or Die Vol. 1 (1999) | Ryde or Die Vol. 2 (2000) |

Singles from Ryde or Die Vol. 1
- 1. "Ryde or Die" Released: 1999; 2. "Jigga My Nigga" Released: May 28, 1999; 3. "What Ya Want" Released: June 1999; 4. "Down Bottom" Released: August 1999

Professional ratings
Review scores
| Source | Rating |
|---|---|
| AllMusic | 3/5 stars |
| Entertainment Weekly | B+ |
| Rolling Stone | 3/5 stars |
| The Village Voice | (choice cut) |

Ryde or Die Vol. 1 is the first compilation album by American hip-hop collective and record label Ruff Ryders. It was released on April 27, 1999 via Interscope Records. Recording sessions took place at Platinum Island Studios, Powerhouse Studios, Soundworks Recording Studio and DMH Studios in New York City and at Festival Studios in New Orleans. Production was handled by Swizz Beatz, Dave "Jam" Hall, DJ Clue?, Jay "Icepick" Jackson, Joaquin "Waah" Dean, Ken "Duro" Ifill and P. Killer Trackz.

In the United States, the album debuted atop the Billboard 200 chart, with roughly 285,000 copies sold in its first week. It received a platinum certification by the Recording Industry Association of America on June 2, 1999 for selling 1,000,000 units in the US alone.

== Track listing ==
| No. | Title | Writer(s) | Producer(s) | Length |
|---|---|---|---|---|
| 1. | "Ryde or Die" (performed by The Lox, DMX, Drag-On and Eve) | Earl Simmons; David Styles; Jason Phillips; Sean Jacobs; Eve Jeffers; Melvin Smalls; Ernesto Shaw; Kenneth Ifill | DJ Clue; Duro | 4:01 |
| 2. | "Down Bottom" (performed by Drag-On and Juvenile) | Smalls; Terius Gray; Kasseem Dean | Swizz Beatz | 4:55 |
| 3. | "What You Want" (performed by Eve and Nokio) | Jeffers; Dean | Swizz Beatz | 4:21 |
| 4. | "Jigga My Nigga" (performed by Jay-Z) | Shawn Carter; Dean | Swizz Beatz | 4:39 |
| 5. | "Takin' $" (Skit) | | Waah | 0:40 |
| 6. | "Dope $" (performed by The Lox) | Styles; Phillips; Anthony Fields | P. Killer Trackz | 4:23 |
| 7. | "I'm a Ruff Ryder" (performed by Parlé) | Dave Hall; Keon Bryce | Dave "Jam" Hall | 5:10 |
| 8. | "Bug Out" (performed by DMX) | Simmons; Dean | Swizz Beatz | 1:19 |
| 9. | "Kiss of Death" (performed by Jadakiss) | Phillips; Dean | Swizz Beatz | 3:43 |
| 10. | "The Hood" (performed by Drag-On, Beanie Sigel, Mysonne, Infa-Red, NuChild and Jadakiss) | Smalls; Shandell Green; Phillips; Dwight Grant; Mysonne Linen; Wallace Lynch; Dean | Swizz Beatz | 3:51 |
| 11. | "Platinum Plus" (performed by Jermaine Dupri, Ma$e and Cross) | Jermaine Dupri; Shawn Martin; Mason Betha; Dean | Swizz Beatz | 3:39 |
| 12. | "Buff Ryders" (Skit) | | Jay "Ice Pick" Jackson | 0:33 |
| 13. | "Do That Shit" (performed by Eve) | Jeffers; Dean | Swizz Beatz | 3:51 |
| 14. | "Piña Colada" (performed by Sheek Louch and Big Pun) | Jacobs; Christopher Rios; Dean | Swizz Beatz | 4:11 |
| 15. | "Some X Shit" (performed by DMX) | Simmons; Dean | Swizz Beatz | 4:47 |
| Total length: | | | | 54:03 |

Sample credits

- Track 1 contains a sample from "Head Banger" performed by EPMD.
- Track 8 contains a sample from "Funky Worm".

== Personnel ==
- Jason "Jadakiss" Phillips – performer (tracks: 1, 6, 9, 10)
- Melvin "Drag-On" Smalls – performer (tracks: 1, 2, 10)
- Eve Jeffers – performer (tracks: 1, 3, 13)
- Earl "DMX" Simmons – performer (tracks: 1, 8, 15)
- David "Styles P" Styles – performer (tracks: 1, 6)
- Sean "Sheek Louch" Jacobs – performer (tracks: 1, 14)
- Terius "Juvenile" Gray – performer (track 2)
- Tamir "Nokio the N-Tity" Ruffin – performer (track 3)
- Shawn "Jay-Z" Carter – performer (track 4)
- Parle' – performer (track 7)
- Shandel "Infa-Red" Green – performer (track 10)
- Dwight "Beanie Sigel" Grant – performer (track 10)
- Mysonne Linen – performer (track 10)
- Wallace "New Child" Lynch – performer (track 10)
- Jermaine Dupri – performer (track 11)
- Shawn "Cross" Martin – performer (track 11)
- Mason "Ma$e" Betha – performer (track 11)
- Christopher "Big Punisher" Rios – performer (track 14)
- Kasseem "Swizz Beatz" Dean – producer (tracks: 2-4, 8-11, 13-15)
- Ernesto "DJ Clue" Shaw – producer (track 1)
- Ken "Duro" Ifill – producer & recording (track 1), mixing (tracks: 1, 2, 4, 8, 15)
- Joaquin "Waah" Dean – producer (track 5), executive producer, art direction, design
- Anthony "P. Killer Trackz" Fields – producer (track 6)
- Dave "Jam" Hall – producer (track 7)
- Jay "Icepick" Jackson – producer (track 12), A&R
- Rich Keller – recording (tracks: 2-4, 6, 8-11, 13-15), mixing (tracks: 3, 6, 9-11, 13, 14)
- Dave Hyman – recording (track 7)
- Acar Key – mixing (track 7)
- Blair Wells – digital editing
- Tony Dawsey – mastering
- Darrin "Dee" Dean – executive producer, A&R
- Charles "Sleep" Duffy – art direction, design
- Fred Stewart – art direction, design
- Jonathan Mannion – photography
- L. Londell McMillan – legal

== Charts ==
=== Weekly charts ===
| Chart (1999) | Peak position |
|---|---|
| UK R&B Albums (Official Charts) | 27 |
| US Billboard 200 | 1 |
| US Top R&B/Hip-Hop Albums (Billboard) | 1 |

=== Year-end charts ===
| Chart (1999) | Position |
|---|---|
| US Billboard 200 | 35 |
| US Top R&B/Hip-Hop Albums (Billboard) | 6 |

== Certifications ==
| Region | Certification | Certified units/sales |
|---|---|---|
| United States (RIAA) | Platinum | 1,000,000^{^} |
^{*} Sales figures based on certification alone.^{^} Shipments figures based on certification alone.

== See also ==
- List of Billboard 200 number-one albums of 1999
- List of Billboard number-one R&B albums of 1999
