= Drag-On =

American rapper (born 1980)

- Born: Melvin Jason Smalls; January 4, 1980 (age 46); New York City, U.S.
- Genres: Hip hop
- Occupations: Rapper; songwriter; actor
- Years active: 1997–present
- Labels: Virgin; Interscope (former); Ruff Ryders; Full Surface

Melvin Jason Smalls (born January 4, 1980), known professionally as Drag-On, is an American rapper. He is best known for his time on Ruff Ryders, through whom he released his debut album, Opposite of H2O (2000). The album was successful, debuting at number five on the US Billboard 200 chart and eventually sold over 500,000 copies and earning a Gold certification from the Recording Industry Association of America (RIAA). Drag-On released his second album Hell and Back, in 2004.

Drag-On has appeared in the 2001 film Exit Wounds and the 2003 Cradle 2 the Grave, both of which stars his then-Ruff Ryders label-mate DMX.

== Early life ==
Drag-On was born Melvin Jason Smalls, was raised in The Bronx, New York City, New York. He was raised in the Bronxdale Houses. Smalls developed an interest in rapping at the age of nine, influenced by artists such as Rakim, Big Daddy Kane, and Slick Rick, and found early creative expression through music. Smalls has had a stutter since childhood.

His father left shortly after his birth, and his mother struggled with drug addiction, leading to frequent absences. As a result, Smalls was often locked out of his apartment and spent periods sleeping in hallways, on trains, and rooftops. In 1995, at age 15, he was involved in a violent altercation that left him with a permanent scar from his left temple to his cheekbone.

He eventually went to live with his grandmother, whom he credited with providing stability and support that allowed him to continue pursuing music.

== Musical career ==
Around 1997, at age 17, Smalls was discovered selling bootleg clothes and music by Darrin "Dee" Dean, the co-founder of Ruff Ryders Entertainment. After performing for Dean at Ruff Ryders studio, Smalls was signed to Ruff Ryders. Drag-On was mentored by DMX, with whom he developed a close friendship. He subsequently signed with B.A.R. Management, the management company owned by DMX’s uncle, Ray Copeland, who also represented DMX. Smalls's original stage name was "Sabretooth Dragon" but was shortened to Drag-On, reflecting his skill at delivering powerful and high-quality lyrics, a quality often described in hip-hop as ‘spitting fire.’

At age 17, Drag-On recorded his first commercial track, appearing on DMX’s May 1998 debut studio album, It's Dark and Hell Is Hot, on the song "For My Dogs". That year, Ruff Ryders signed a joint-venture deal with Interscope Records, which placed Drag-On under the Interscope umbrella. He subsequently appeared on DMX's second studio album as well, Flesh of My Flesh, Blood of My Blood, released in December 1998.

Drag-On appeared prominently on Ruff Ryders' debut compilation album, Ryde or Die Vol.1, released in April 1999. He appeared on three songs: "Ryde or Die", "The Hood", and "Down Bottom", the latter being released as the fourth single from the album. Drag-On also made a guest appearance on DMX's December 1999 third studio album, ...And Then There Was X, appearing on the song "D-X-L (Hard White)".

Drag-On's debut album, Opposite of H2O, was released on March 28, 2000 through Interscope and Ruff Ryders. Featuring the single Spit These Bars, the album debuted and peaked in the top 5 on the Billboard 200. Selling over 150, 000 copies in its first week, the album was ultimately certified gold by the RIAA for sales of over 500,000 copies, making it Drag-On's bestselling album. Critical reception to the album was mixed to average. In July, Drag-On appeared on Ruff Ryders' second compilation album, Ryde or Die Vol.2, appearing on the songs "Twisted Heat" and "Weed, Hoes, Dough".

== Discography ==
=== Studio albums ===
List of albums, with selected chart positions
Title	Album details	Peak chart positions		Certifications
Title	Album details	US	US R&B	Certifications
Opposite of H2O	Released: March 28, 2000; Label: Ruff Ryders, Interscope; Format: CD, cassette, digital download	5	2	RIAA: Gold
Hell and Back	Released: February 10, 2004; Label: Ruff Ryders, Virgin; Format: CD, digital download	47	5	
Hood Environment	Released: September 4, 2007; Label: Hood Environment; Format: CD, digital download	–	—	

=== Singles ===
==== As lead artist ====
List of singles, with selected chart positions
Title	Year	Peak chart positions		Album
Title	Year	US R&B	US Rap	Album
"Down Bottom" (featuring Juvenile)	1999	43	5	Ryde or Die
"Spit These Bars" (featuring Swizz Beatz)	1999	80	–	Opposite of H2O
"Niggaz Die 4 Me" (with DMX)	2000	—	—	Opposite of H2O

=== Guest appearances ===
List of non-single guest appearances, with other performing artists, showing year released and album name
Title	Year	Artist(s)	Album
"For My Dogs"	1998	DMX, Big Stan, Loose, Kasino	It's Dark and Hell Is Hot
"Ruff Ryders' Anthem" (Remix)	1998	DMX, Eve, Jadakiss, Styles P	The Professional
"No Love 4 Me"	1998	DMX, Swizz Beatz	Flesh of My Flesh, Blood of My Blood
"100 Shiesty's"	1999	Harlem World	The Movement
"Ryde or Die"	1999	The Lox, DMX, Eve	Ryde or Die Vol. 1
"Down Bottom"	1999	Juvenile	Ryde or Die Vol. 1
"The Hood"	1999	Swizz Beatz, Beanie Sigel, Infa-Red, NuChild, Mysonne	Ryde or Die Vol. 1
"We Got That"	1999	Warren G, Eve, Shadow	I Want It All
"I Want It All" (Remix)	1999	Warren G, Memphis Bleek, Tikki Diamond	I Want It All
"Pay Per View"	1999	Jadakiss, Eve, Styles P	WCW Mayhem: The Music
"D-X-L (Hard White)"	1999	DMX, The Lox	... And Then There Was X
"Move Right Now"	2000	Swizz Beatz, Eve	Music from the Motion Picture Any Given Sunday
"If You Know"	2000	The Lox, Eve, Swizz Beatz	We Are the Streets
"You Was Wrong"	2000	Big Pun, Fat Joe, Remy Ma	Yeeeah Baby
"Weed, Hoes, Dough"	2000	—N/a	Ryde or Die Vol. 2
"Twisted Heat"	2000	Swizz Beatz, Twista	Ryde or Die Vol. 2
"Call Me Drag-On"	2000	—N/a	60 Minutes of Funk, Volume IV: The Mixtape
"Got What You Need"	2001	Eve, Swizz Beatz	Scorpion
"Thug in the Street"	2001	Eve, The Lox	Scorpion
"It's Time I See You"	2001	The Lox, Eve, Infa-Red, Cross	Kiss tha Game Goodbye
"It Was Written"	2001	Damian Marley, Stephen Marley, Capleton	Halfway Tree
"Dirrty"	2001	Petey Pablo	Ryde or Die Vol. 3: In the "R" We Trust
"We Don't Give a Fuck"	2001	Fiend	Ryde or Die Vol. 3: In the "R" We Trust
"Street Team"	2001	Infa-Red, Cross	Ryde or Die Vol. 3: In the "R" We Trust
"Untouchable"	2003	DMX, Syleena Johnson, Cross, Infa-Red, Sheek Louch	Grand Champ
"Move Back"	2005	Ol' Dirty Bastard, The Lenox Ave. Boys, Jae Millz, Cardan, Terra Blacks	Osirus
"BMW (Bronx Most Wanted)"	2005	Lord Tariq	The Barcode
"Knock Knock"	2005	Chocolate Ty	Vol. 4: The Redemption
"Throw It Up"	2005	—N/a	Vol. 4: The Redemption
"Bust Ya Gunz"	2007	Swizz Beatz	One Man Band Man
"Cook It Up"	2007	Big Sha, Iveta	Хляб И Амфети
"World's Greatest"	2011	Mook, DMX, The Lox, Swizz Beatz	Ruff Ryders: Past, Present, Future
"Hip Hop"	2011	Swizz Beatz	Ruff Ryders: Past, Present, Future
"Say Word"	2015	Sy Ari da Kid, K Camp, DC Young Fly, Snootie Wild, OG Maco, Kap G, Tha Joker, Jarren Benton, Zach Farlow, Nyemiah Supreme, Scotty ATL, Mike Fresh, Zuse, Royce Rizzy, Wave Chapelle, Katie Got Bandz, Rich the Kid, A1 the Supergroup, Yowda, Bandit Gang Marco, Translee, Zip K, Fat Bax, D Chamberz, Math Hoffa	S.O.O.N (Somethin Out of Nothin)
"Rolling 110 Deep"	2021	DJ Kay Slay, Sheek Louch, Styles P, Dave East, Crooked I, Black Thought, Conway the Machine, Raekwon, Ghostface Killah, Inspectah Deck, Papoose, Loaded Lux, AZ, Bun B, Fred the Godson, Jim Jones, Ransom, Rah Digga, M.O.P., Trae tha Truth, Joell Ortiz, Lord Tariq and Peter Gunz, Cory Gunz, Shaquille O'Neal, Roy Jones Jr., Kool DJ Red Alert, Redman, Young Buck, MC Serch, Big Daddy Kane, MC Shan, KRS-One, Jon Connor, Twista, Chris Rivers, Nino Man, Locksmith, 3D Na'Tee, Trick Trick, Tragedy Khadafi, E-A-Ski, Cassidy, Freddie Foxxx, Gillie da King, Ice-T, Treach, Kool G Rap, Lil' Cease, RJ Payne, J.R. Writer, Shoota 93, Ms. Hustle, Vado, Mysonne, Mistah F.A.B., Saigon, Melle Mel, Grandmaster Caz, Havoc, Tracey Lee, E.D.I. Mean, Young Noble, McGruff, Stan Spit, Sickflo, Onyx, Ras Kass, Termanology, DJ Doo Wop, Junior Reid, Oun P, Merkules, Wais P, Maino, Uncle Murda, PT Capone Mobstyle, Mike Cee, Royal Flush, Super Lover Cee, Page Kennedy, Rockness, Gunplay, Brand Nubian, Sonja Blade, Coke La Rock, Nice & Smooth, Consequence, Millyz, OT the Real, Ron Artest, Kaflow, Tone Trump, Hocus 45th, Omar Epps, Bodega Bamz, Bynoe, PTKNY, Aobie, Sporty Thievz, Tony Moxberg, Styleon, Chuck D, Sauce Money	Accolades
"Bae-Cation"	2020	James Artissen	Kaleidoscopes
