= The Emcee's Properganda =

Jin Presents: The Emcee's Properganda

Studio album by Jin
- Released: October 25, 2005
- Genre: Hip hop
- Length: 48:12
- Label: Draft; Crafty Plugz
- Producer: Kamel Pratt (exec.); Howie McDuffie (exec.); Graham Oliver (exec.); Golden Child; Demo

Jin chronology
The Rest Is History (2004)	Jin Presents: The Emcee's Properganda (2005)	100 Grand Jin (2006)

Singles from The Emcee's Properganda
- 1. "Top 5 (Dead or Alive)"

Professional ratings
Review scores
Source	Rating
Allmusic	3/5 stars
FFWD	3/5 stars
HipHopDX	3.5/5 stars
hoodstars.net	4.5/5 stars
Okayplayer	4/5 stars
RapReviews.com	7/10 stars

The Emcee's Properganda is Jin's second studio album. It was released on October 25, 2005. The whole album was produced by Golden Child with the exception of "Properganda", which was produced by Demo. The album was recorded at No Mystery Studios and engineered by Vinny Nicoletti. The album was mixed at Storm Studios by Storm. "Top 5 (Dead or Alive)" was released as a 12" vinyl single with "Perspectives" as the B-side. The music video for "Top 5 (Dead or Alive)" was directed by Todd Angkasuwan. The song "G.O.L.D.E.N." was used on the soundtrack of the video-game Saints Row on the fictional radio station KRHYME 95.4.

== Track listing ==
All tracks produced by Golden Child, with the exception of track 6 "Properganda" produced by Demo.

No.	Title	Writer(s)	Producer(s)	Length
1.	"The Emcee" (skit)	Jin Au-Yeung, Sean Mannan	Golden Child	0:21
2.	"Perspectives"	J. Au-Yeung, S. Mannan	Golden Child	4:02
3.	"Top 5 (Dead or Alive)"	J. Au-Yeung, S. Mannan	Golden Child	4:55
4.	"Mr. Popular"	J. Au-Yeung, S. Mannan	Golden Child	4:43
5.	"My First Time"	J. Au-Yeung, S. Mannan	Golden Child	2:07
6.	"Properganda"	J. Au-Yeung, Juanita, Jefforey	Demo	4:12
7.	"No More Fans"	J. Au-Yeung, S. Mannan	Golden Child	4:00
8.	"G.O.L.D.E.N."	J. Au-Yeung, S. Mannan	Golden Child	3:29
9.	"Foolish Little Girls"	J. Au-Yeung, S. Mannan	Golden Child	3:52
10.	"The Craftiest" (skit)	J. Au-Yeung, S. Mannan	Golden Child	2:56
11.	"100 Thousand Sold Pt. 2"	J. Au-Yeung, S. Mannan	Golden Child	3:16
12.	"No Concept" (featuring Yung Mac & LS)	J. Au-Yeung, S. Mannan, Christopher Lui, Michel Luu	Golden Child	2:51
13.	"Carpe Diem"	J. Au-Yeung, S. Mannan	Golden Child	3:36
14.	"It's All Over"	J. Au-Yeung, S. Mannan	Golden Child	3:48

== Samples ==
The Emcee

- Samples speech said by KRS-One in the DVD "The MC: Why We Do It"

Perspectives

- Contains additional sampled speech from KRS-One
- Contains lyrics from "I Can" by Nas

Top 5 (Dead or Alive)

- Contains vocal samples from Nas as performed in "Ether"
- Contains vocal samples from Jadakiss as performed in "Made You Look (Remix)" by Nas

Mr. Popular

- Contains vocal samples from Big L as performed in "Put It On"
- Contains vocal samples from James Brown as performed in "Hot Pants"

Properganda

- Contains an interpolation of "If I Ruled the World (Imagine That)" by Nas

No More Fans

- Contains an interpolation of "Urvashi Urvashi" by Humse hai Muqabala

G.O.L.D.E.N.

- Contains lyrics from "We Gonna Make It" as performed by Jadakiss,
- Contains Just Blaze's phrase

Foolish Little Girls

- Samples "Foolish Little Girl" by The Shirelles

The Craftiest

- Voice clips of fans

No Concept

- Contains an interpolation of "Check the Rhime" by A Tribe Called Quest
