= I Promise (album) =

Studio album by Jin
- Released: November 1, 2006
- Recorded: 2006
- Genre: East Coast hip hop
- Length: 50:36
- Label: Crafty Plugz
- Producer: Jin (exec.); Roy P. Perez© (exec.); Kamel Pratt (exec.); Pluto; Flaco Da Great; Obi & Josh; Hektic; Music Mystro

Jin chronology
100 Grand Jin (2006)	I Promise (2006)	ABC (2007)

Singles from I Promise
- 1. "36-24-36 (Applebottom Jeans)"

Professional ratings
Review scores
Source	Rating
Music For America	(favorable) link
RapReviews.com	link

I Promise also known as the MySpace Album is a 2006 album by Chinese-American rapper Jin. It was released on November 1, 2006.

== Background ==
It is his third official CD and was sold through MySpace.com only. It became available on November 1 to November 27 for his fans on MySpace. People who ordered the album on those days got the album just in time for Christmas and specially autographed by Jin himself writing "PEACE JIN". It was then sold on CDBaby.com with limited copies being pressed and not autographed for people who were unable to purchase it before. Jin claims his reasons for selling it through MySpace only is because people don't buy CDs in the stores anymore. On top of that he wanted to avoid the hassles of putting the record in stores and get it to the public before the end of 2006. The first single from the CD is "36-24-36 (Applebottom Jeans)" and the project was executive produced by Roy P. Perez© .

== Track listing ==
#	Title	Songwriters	Producer(s)	Performer (s)
1	"Name Calling"	J. Au-Yeung	Pluto	Jin
2	"Yeah"	J. Au-Yeung	Pluto	Jin
3	"Determination"	J. Au-Yeung	Flaco Da Great	Jin
4	"Doin' What I Do"	J. Au-Yeung, D. Rae	Pluto	Jin, Dina Rae
5	"MySpace Collabo"	J. Au-Yeung	Pluto	*Interlude*
6	"I Download"	J. Au-Yeung	Pluto	Jin
7	"36-24-36 (Applebottom Jeans)"	J. Au-Yeung	Obi & Josh	Jin
8	"Perfect Strangers"	J. Au-Yeung, B. Ellis	Pluto	Jin, Bryan Ellis
9	"Clap Your Hands"	J. Au-Yeung	Pluto	Jin
10	"Can't Wait"	J. Au-Yeung, M. Luu, D. Rae	Pluto & Music Mystro	Jin, Yung Mac, Dina Rae
11	"Crafty Awards (Skit)"	J. Au-Yeung	Pluto	*Interlude*
12	"Award Show"	J. Au-Yeung	Pluto	Jin
13	"Chinese Food"	J. Au-Yeung	Hector Mendoza Jr.	Jin
14	"I Promise"	J. Au-Yeung	Music Mystro	Jin
15	"Goodbye"	J. Au-Yeung	Music Mystro	Jin
