= The Rest Is History (Jin album) =

Studio album by Jin
- Released: October 19, 2004
- Recorded: 2003–2004
- Genre: Hip-hop
- Length: 65:53
- Labels: Ruff Ryders; Virgin
- Producers: Bernard Grobman; Bink!; Denaun Porter; Elite; Jerry "Wonda" Duplessis; J. R. Rotem; Just Blaze; Kanye West; Ken Lewis; Kwame "K1 Mil"; Mr. Devine; Neo Da Matrix; Swizz Beatz; Tuneheadz; Wyclef Jean

Jin chronology
The Rest Is History (2004)	The Emcee's Properganda (2005)

Singles from The Rest Is History
- 1. "Learn Chinese"; 2. "Senorita"; 3. "So Afraid"; 4. "Get Your Handz Off"

The Rest Is History is American rapper Jin's debut studio album. It was released on October 19, 2004, by Ruff Ryders and Virgin Records.

== Background ==
Originally titled Almost Famous, the album was delayed for over a year. Originally slated for a summer 2003 release it was pushed back to an October 2003 date. After plans did not materialize due to disputes with Virgin Records, the album's release date was pushed back once more to March 23, 2004. However, the release date got pushed back twice more, to August 24, 2004, until it finally arrived, with a completely new title, on October 19, 2004.

During the year-long delay, Jin released the two mixtapes called History in the Making and Definition of History. After the album was released Jin released the last in the History mixtape series Lost History.

A promotional track, Chinatown featuring fellow Chinese-American rapper L.S. was thought to be the first single. The first official single, "Learn Chinese", came out in late 2003. "Get Your Handz Off", another promotional single (second overall) was released online and impacted radio on June 29, 2004. The second single for the album was slated to be "I Got A Love", but Roc-A-Fella Records blocked the decision, fearing too many singles would over-expose Kanye West.

Kanye West included an extra verse in "I Got a Love (Remix)", which was later used in his song "I Wonder" on his album, Graduation. Due to the decision of the executives at Roc-A-Fella,"Señorita" and "So Afraid" were the second and third singles respectively, both released on August 31, 2004.

=== Promotional singles ===
- Chinatown was released on the first and only promo single. It was rumored to be the first single from the album. It features Jin's close friend and fellow Chinese American rapper, L.S.

=== Miscellaneous ===
- The tracks "A Little Hungry" and "Check the Clock" were omitted from the North American release.
- There is an alternate version of "Thank You", however, it did not make the final cut, but was used in his later mixtape I Quit.
- "C'Mon" contains a sample from Eminem's song, "Sing for the Moment", which in turn samples the Aerosmith song, "Dream On".

== Reception ==
Professional ratings
Review scores
Source	Rating
AllHipHop	2.5/5 stars
AllMusic	3/5 stars
Blender	3/5 stars
MSN Music	3/5 stars
RapReviews	7.5/10

The album had favorable to mixed reviews. AllMusic has stated "The Rest Is History showcases Jin's talents at length, but its stilted moments are as plentiful as its impressive ones, if not more so, perhaps explaining why it took the album a year to see the light of day." RapReviews.com has stated "Thankfully, these tracks are exceptions as opposed to the rule, so The Rest is History works quite well as a whole. Above all else Jin has proved that his Freestyle Friday victories and his signing to Ruff Ryders was not a joke - and if anything is the best thing to happen to that crew in a long time. So what ultimately is history here? All of the haters who are swinging on Jin's nuts."

== Chart performance ==
The album debuted at the #54 on the Billboard 200 selling 20,000 copies in its first week and spent 3 weeks on the charts, peaking at #54. The album also spent 7 weeks on the Billboard Top R&B/Hip-Hop Albums debuting at #12. It also spent two weeks at the Billboard Top Rap Albums debuting at #8. The album to date has sold over 100,000 units in the United States and over 250,000 worldwide.

== Track listing ==
No.	Title	Writer(s)	Producer	Length
1.	"Intro / The Signing" (skit)	Jin Au-Yeung; Joaquin "Wash" Dean; Anthony Parrino; Franklin Crum; Eriberio Serrano	Tuneheadz	1:15
2.	"Here Now"	Au-Yeung; Earl Hayes; Bashir Fida-i; Crum; Serrano	Tuneheadz	3:44
3.	"Get Your Handz Off" (featuring Swizz Beatz)	Au-Yeung; Quaadir Atkinson; Carlos Wilson; Lou Wilson; Ric Wilson; Alfred V. Brown	Neo Da Matrix	3:08
4.	"Club Song"	Au-Yeung; Justin Smith	Just Blaze	4:16
5.	"The Come Thru" (featuring Twista)	Au-Yeung; Carl Mitchell; Roosevelt Harrell	Bink!	3:52
6.	"So Afraid"	Au-Yeung; Siddiq Booker; Kwamé Holland	Kwame "K1 Mil"	3:35
7.	"I Got a Love" (featuring Kanye West)	Au-Yeung; Kanye West; Hayes; Fida-i; Lenny Williams; Michael Bennett	Kanye West	3:59
8.	"Chinese Beats" (skit)	Au-Yeung; Atkinson	Neo Da Matrix	1:57
9.	"Learn Chinese" (featuring Wyclef Jean)	Au-Yeung; Wyclef Jean; Jerry Duplessis; James Brown; Charles Bobbitt; Fred Wesley	Wyclef Jean; Jerry "Wonder" Duplessis	4:32
10.	"The Good, the Bad, and the Ugly"	Au-Yeung; Hayes; Fida-i; Jonathan Rotem	J. R. Rotem	4:01
11.	"Señorita"	Au-Yeung; Sean Martin; Fida-i; Atkinson; Gerald Florio; Rupert Holmes	Neo Da Matrix	3:50
12.	"Love Story" (featuring Aja Smith)	Au-Yeung; Loren Lunnon; Ernie Isley; O'Kelly Isley; Marvin Isley; Ronald Isley; Rudolph Isley; Chris Jasper	Mr. Devine	4:42
13.	"Cold Outside" (featuring Lyfe Jennings)	Au-Yeung; Hayes; Chester Jennings; Atkinson; Ken Lewis	Neo Da Matrix; Ken Lewis	3:58
14.	"C'mon"	Au-Yeung; Hayes; Fida-i; Rotem	J. R. Rotem	4:07
15.	"Karaoke Night" (featuring Styles P)	Au-Yeung; David Styles; Parrino	Elite	3:28
16.	"Same Cry" (featuring L.T.)	Au-Yeung; Fida-i; Lynne Timmes; Lunnon; Bernard Grobman	Mr. Devine; Bernard Grobman (add.)	4:37
17.	"Thank You"	Au-Yeung; Lunnon	Mr. Devine	6:22

Bonus Tracks
No.	Title	Producer	Length
18.	"A Little Hungry"	Elite	3:53
19.	"Check the Clock" (featuring Swizz Beatz)	Swizz Beatz	3:11

== Samples and interpolations ==
"Get Your Handz Off"

- contains a sample from "Children Of The Sun" by Mandrill

"I Got a Love"

- contains a sample from Lenny Williams's "Cause I Love You"

"Learn Chinese"

- contains samples from James Brown's "Blind Man Can See It"
- contains elements of Yellowman's "Mr. Chin"
- contains added vocals by Ayeesha

"Senorita"

- contains replayed elements from the composition "Give Up Your Guns" written by Gerald Florio and Rupert Holmes

"Love Story"

- contains interpolation from "Groove With You" by Isley Brothers

"C'mon"

- contains a sample from Eminem's song, "Sing for the Moment", which in turn samples the Aerosmith song, "Dream On"

== Personnel ==
- Ayeesha – additional vocals (9)
- Jerry Barnes – guitars (12)
- Dragon "Chach" Cacinovic – mixing (1–3, 5–8, 10–17)
- Firon "4-Ron" Chisholm – engineer (4, 15, 17)
- Tony Dawsey – mastering
- Caryn Golonka – additional vocals (13)
- Bernard Grobman – guitars (16)
- Jef Lee Johnson – guitars (12)
- Gimel "Young Guru" Keaton – mixing (4)
- Brent Kolatalo – engineer (13)
- Ken Lewis – acoustic guitar and strings (11), instrumentation (13)
- Chris Steinmetz – Twista vocal engineer (5)
- Serge "Sergical" Tsai – engineer and mixing (9)
- Randy "Ogre Boy" Williams – engineer (1–3, 5–8, 10–14, 16)

== Album chart positions ==
Chart performance for The Rest Is History
Chart (2004)	Peak position
US Billboard 200	54
US Top R&B/Hip-Hop Albums (Billboard)	12
