= ABC (Jin album) =

Studio album by MC Jin
- Released: February 20, 2007; August 6, 2008 (HK Edition)
- Recorded: 2006
- Venue: United States; Hong Kong
- Genre: Hong Kong hip hop
- Length: 32:22
- Language: Cantonese
- Label: Imperial; Raptivism; Crafty Plugz; Catch Music Group; Universal Music Hong Kong
- Producer: Carl Choi "Catch" (exec.); Kamel Pratt (exec.); Bionik; Far*East Movement; Riot

MC Jin chronology
| I Promise (2006) | ABC (2007) | 買一送一 (2010) |

Singles from ABC
- 1. "ABC"; 2. "Yum Dum Cha"

ABC (Hong Kong Edition)
- Cover for Hong Kong re-release in 2008.

Professional ratings
Review scores
| Source | Rating |
|---|---|
| XXL Magazine | (M) link |

ABC is a 2007 album by Chinese-American rapper MC Jin. ABC is Jin's fourth studio album, and his first Cantonese studio album. It was released on February 20, 2007. In 2008 the album was re-released by Universal Music Hong Kong with different album art.

== Background ==
The album is almost entirely in Cantonese and produced by American hip-hop group Far East Movement. "ABC" stands for "American Born Chinese".

The first single from this album is "ABC." A music video was shot for it and debuted on MTV Chi on January 26, 2007.

The second single is "Yum Dum Cha" and Jin filmed a music video for it on May 16. Yum Dum Cha was released on YouTube on July 18, 2007.

The song "HK Superstar" featuring Daniel Wu was included in the soundtrack of the 2013 movie Fast & Furious 6.

== Track listing ==
| # | Title | Songwriters | Producer(s) | Performer(s) |
|---|---|---|---|---|
| 1 | "ABC" | J. Au-Yeung | Riot, Far*East Movement, Bionik | Jin |
| 2 | "真正 Hip Hop" (It's Hip Hop) | J. Au-Yeung | The Far*East Movement, Bionik | Jin |
| 3 | "香港 Superstar" (HK Superstar) featuring Daniel Wu | J. Au-Yeung | The Far*East Movement, Bionik | Jin, Daniel Wu |
| 4 | "識講唔識睇" (Speak Can't Read) | J. Au-Yeung | The Far*East Movement, Bionik | Jin |
| 5 | "Ape Shall Never" | J. Au-Yeung | The Far*East Movement, Bionik | Jin |
| 6 | "飲啖茶" (Yum Dum Cha) | J. Au-Yeung | The Far*East Movement, Bionik | Jin |
| 7 | "喂喂搵邊位" (Who are you looking for?) | J. Au-Yeung | The Far*East Movement, Bionik | Jin |
| 8 | "即食面" (Instant Noodle) | J. Au-Yeung | The Far*East Movement, Bionik | Jin |
| 9 | "1997" | J. Au-Yeung | The Far*East Movement, Bionik | Jin |
| 10 | "搵兩餐" (Making a Living/Earn Two Meals) featuring Ken Oak | J. Au-Yeung | The Far*East Movement, Bionik | Jin, Ken Oak |

=== Hong Kong Edition Bonus ===
| # | Title | Songwriters | Producer(s) | Performer(s) |
|---|---|---|---|---|
| 11 | "上堂時間" (Class Time) | J.Au-Yeung | | Jin |

==== HK Edition DVD ====
1. ABC [Music Video]
2. 香港 Superstar (ft. 吳彥祖) [Music Video]
3. 飲啖茶 [Music Video]
4. 喂喂搵邊位 [Music Video]
5. 搵兩餐 (ft. Ken Oak) [Music Video]
6. 上堂時間 [Music Video]
