= Joseph Vincent =

American singer-songwriter

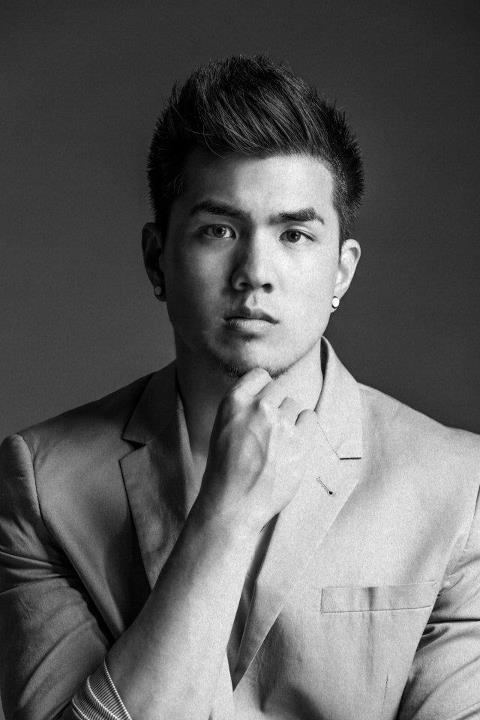

Background information
- Born: August 15, 1989 (age 37)
- Origin: Los Angeles, California
- Genres: Acoustic, pop
- Instruments: Guitar, Vocals, Ukulele, Oboe
- Website: www.josephvincentmusic.com

Joseph Vincent is a Filipino-American guitarist, singer, and songwriter. Joseph has been twice featured on NBC's The Ellen DeGeneres Show and has performed at well-known Los Angeles venues, such as The House of Blues, The Knitting Factory, Roxy Theatre, El Rey Theatre, The Troubadour, among international venues in Australia, Singapore, and Canada.

== Early life ==
Joseph Vincent was born on August 15, 1989, in Los Angeles, California, United States. He is of Filipino descent. Vincent picked up his first guitar when he was 15 and started by playing song covers of some of his main musical influences, such as Jack Johnson and Jason Mraz. He began writing and composing his own original songs at the age of 16. Vincent graduated from the University of California-Irvine in 2011.

== Career ==
Vincent entered the music scene in June 2008 by uploading cover songs to YouTube, where he became widely recognized. As of March 27, 2022, he has over 1.67 million subscribers and over 324 million views. Vincent has often collaborated with other well-known Youtube artists, such as Jason Chen and Clara C. Although he is best known in the United States, Vincent has become internationally popular, having performed sold out shows in Singapore, Canada, and Australia, and being voted Australia’s "Youtube Artist of the Year" by Star Central magazine.

Outside of his YouTube success, Vincent was the winner of Kababayan LA's first 'Kababayan Superstar' contest in 2009 and has been featured twice on NBC's The Ellen DeGeneres Show; he was featured first for their Wonderful Web of Wonderment, and later as a performer on April 29 and May 27, 2010.

On September 14, 2010, Vincent signed to Catch Adventures and was managed by Tom Ngo, releasing his debut album, Blue Skies, in late 2012. Vincent performed on the main stage at California food festival 626 Night Market on August 16, 2014, at their Santa Anita Park, Arcadia location and again on June 6, 2015, at their OC Fair & Event Center, Costa Mesa location.

== Discography ==
=== Albums ===
- Blue Skies (2012)

=== Singles ===
Title	Year	Album
"If You Stay"	2011	Blue Skies
"Bumblebee"	2011	Blue Skies
"S.A.D."	2012	Blue Skies
"All I Wanted"	2015	Non-album single
