= Ruff Ryders Entertainment =

American hip-hop record label

- Parent company: Universal Music Group
- Founded: 1988; 38 years ago
- Founder: Joaquin "Waah" Dean; Darrin "Dee" Dean; Chivon Dean
- Status: Active
- Distributors: Interscope Records (1998–2003); Def Jam Recordings (DMX; 1997–2006); Virgin Records (July 14, 2003–2005)
- Genre: Hip-hop; hardcore hip-hop; R&B
- Country of origin: United States
- Location: 33 S Broadway, Yonkers, New York, U.S.; 303 McLean Ave, Yonkers, New York, U.S.
- Official website: ruffryders.com

Ruff Ryders Entertainment is an American hip-hop record label and management company founded in 1988 by siblings and record executives Joaquin "Waah", Darrin "Dee" and Chivon Dean. It operated as a subsidiary of Universal, and distributed by Interscope Records, with Def Jam Recordings serving as the distributor for DMX albums.

The label went on to launch the careers of several successful artists such as their flagship artist DMX, Eve, The LOX (Jadakiss, Sheek Louch , and Styles P), Drag-On, MC Jin, producers Dame Grease and the Deans' nephew, Swizz Beatz among others. The Ruff Ryders namesake also referred to a loose-knit hip-hop collective composed of the core signees of the label. Ruff Ryders and its main studio Powerhouse Studios are headquartered at 33 South Broadway in Yonkers, New York.

== History ==
=== 1988–99: Rise and success ===
Joaquin "Waah" Dean was a hustler trying to transition to entertainment, Puff Daddy and Waah knew each other from both being raised in Mount Vernon, New York, Waah asked him for advice on the industry and was introduced to producer Chad Elliott as a result. The initial group started with Waah's nephew Swizz Beatz as a child, a preteen Jadakiss, and DMX. In 1988,

The label's operational roots began in the Schlobohm housing projects in Yonkers, New York, where music executive Irv Gotti first met DMX alongside the Dean brothers. This local meeting led to the recording of DMX's earliest demos and established the groundwork for his management deal with Ruff Ryders.

Irv Gotti was roommates with Elliott who later introduced him in Yonkers to DMX and brothers Waah and Darrin "Dee" Dean, who had mentioned they were creating a company called Ruff Ryders together. Elliott produced a beat in 1989 called Born Loser which became one of DMX's first music demo's and later became his debut single in 1992. Dean represented DMX after he was featured as DMX The Great in the Unsigned Hype column of The Source magazine in January 1991.

An advance for Born Loser of $50,000—$75,000 allowed the Deans to build the Ruff Ryders headquarters in Yonkers, which includes Powerhouse studios and offices. Gotti convinced Waah to buy him a Akai MPC60 drum machine to produce records for DMX which resulted in the 1995 single Make a Move.

Ruff Ryders began as a management company, representing DMX and The LOX. The company managed The LOX during the release of their first album, Money, Power & Respect, released in 1998. The album featured a guest appearance from DMX and production from Ruff Ryders producer Dame Grease.

In 1997, through Def Jam A&R executive Irv Gotti, Def Jam signed Ruff Ryders artist DMX. Following DMX's signing to Def Jam, Ruff Ryders was launched as a record label, though they would not get a label deal until a year later. DMX's first studio album, It's Dark and Hell Is Hot was released on May 12, 1998 and was the first release from Ruff Ryders as a record label. Portions of the album were recorded at Ruff Ryders' main studio, Powerhouse studios, in Yonkers. The album featured guest appearances from fellow Ruff Ryders artists Loose and Big Stan, as well as a then 17-year old Drag-On, who signed in 1997. It also featured production from in-house Ruff Ryders producers P.K. and Dame Grease as well as the Deans' then teenage nephew Swizz Beatz, who was relatively unknown at the time. It's Dark And Hell Is Hot debuted at number 1 on the Billboard top 200 and sold over 250,000 copies in its first week. The album went on to sell four million copies in America, being certified quadruple platinum by the RIAA, and sold five million copies worldwide.

DMX's success lead to Ruff Ryders signing a joint venture deal with The Universal Music Group's Interscope Records in 1998 before the release of DMX's second album. The strong success of It's Dark and Hell Is Hot catapulted Ruff Ryders and DMX into mainstream superstardom and prompted Def Jam's leader Lyor Cohen to challenge DMX to record another album quickly to have another album released within the same calendar year. DMX's second studio album, Flesh of My Flesh, Blood of My Blood, was released on December 22, 1998 through Ruff Ryders. Much of the album featured production from Swizz Beatz, who began to produce more for the label's roster. Flesh Of My Flesh, Blood Of My Blood debuted at number one and sold over 670,000 units in its first week of release. It went on to sell over three million copies. By this time, Ruff Ryders enlisted Jay Jackson and Amelia Moore as A&R coordinators. Waah and Dee remained executive producers and A&Rs, with Dee also being the stylist for the label.

On April 27, 1999, Ruff Ryders released its debut compilation album, Ryde or Die Vol. 1. It featured the first appearance of rapper Eve as a Ruff Ryder, as well as introduced new Ruff Ryders artists Infa-Red & Cross, and Raleigh, North Carolina Contemporary R&B group Parlè. The LOX and its solo members greatly contributed to the album, though the group was still signed to Bad Boy Records at the time. Swizz Beatz produced a significant portion of the album, with Waah, P.K. and Ice Pick contributing production to other songs and skits. Ryde or Die, Vol.1 debuted and peaked at number one on the Billboard 200, and was ultimately certified Platinum by the RIAA. It featured the moderately successful lead single Down Bottom, credited mainly to Drag-On. Though the album version of Down Bottom featured rapper Juvenile, the music video version (only included on the Spit These Bars CD single) features a verse from new Ruff Ryders affiliate Yung Wun. Yung Wun, an Atlanta, Georgia native, began affiliating with Ruff Ryders in 1999 after his label, Dark Society, presented his music to Swizz Beatz, who in turn presented the music to Ruff Ryders executives.

Though not present on Ryde or Die Vol.1, Yung Wun would make appearances on subsequent albums. Ruff Ryders began working with him and were prepping to release his debut album. Though a Yung Wun album was released, it was not under Ruff Ryders.

Ruff Ryders closed out the year 1999 with DMX's third studio album, ...And Then There Was X. Featuring production from Ruff Ryders producers Swizz Beatz, P. Killer Trackz, and DJ Shok, it also featured guest appearances from Drag-On and The LOX. The album debuted atop the Billboard 200, selling close to 700,000 copies in its first week. With over five million copies sold in total, the album remains the best selling album for both DMX and Ruff Ryders.

=== 2000–04: Continued success ===
On March 28, 2000, Ruff Ryders released Drag-On's debut studio album, Opposite of H2O. The album featured production from Ruff Ryders in house producers DJ Iroc, P.K./P. Killer Trackz, DJ Shok, Jay "Icepick Jay" Jackson, and Swizz Beatz as well as guest appearances from Ruff Ryders acts Parle, Eve, The LOX, Styles, Swizz Beatz, Jadakiss, and DMX. Critical reception was mixed to average, but was nonetheless a commercial success. Supported by the moderately successful lead single Spit These Bars, the album debuted and peaked in the top 5 on the Billboard 200 and was certified Gold in America.

On July 4, 2000, Ruff Ryders released their second compilation album, Ryde or Die Vol. 2. The project featured production from core in-house producers Swizz Beatz, Icepick, and P. Killer Trackz, along with contributions from new Ruff Ryders producers Mahogany, Teflon, and TJ Beatz. Executive production was handled by Darrin and Joaquin Dean, Chivon Dean, and Ruff Ryders marketing executive Leota Blacknor. The album included appearances from regular Ruff Ryders artists such as DMX, Eve, The LOX, and Parlè, while also introducing new affiliates like Yung Wun and Larsiny. Larsiny, a Philadelphia-based rap group discovered by Swizz Beatz’s father, Terrence Dean, signed with the Ruff Ryders subsidiary label TD Entertainment in 1999. One of its members, Cassidy, would later achieve solo success under Swizz Beatz’s Full Surface Records in the 2000s. Although Ryde or Die Vol. 2 didn’t receive the same critical acclaim as its predecessor, it was a commercial success, earning platinum certification in the U.S.

Around 2000, Ruff Ryders began experiencing with film and launched Ruff Ryders Television & Film. Ruff Ryders had hopes of releasing a film titled My Brother's Keeper with an accompanying soundtrack. However, both the film and the accompanying soundtrack were never released.

The label promoted the idea of all its acts being part of the "Ruff Ryders family", as evidenced when DMX won Best Rap Album at the 2000 Billboard Music Awards and was joined on stage by other Ruff Ryders when he went to accept his award. That same year, Ruff Ryders toured with Cash Money Records from February to April.

In August 2001, Jadakiss released his debut album, Kiss Tha Game Goodbye, through Interscope and Ruff Ryders. The album was a critical and commercial success, being certified Gold by the RIAA. It featured guest appearances by Ruff Ryders label-mates DMX, Sheek, Styles, Drag-On, Eve, Parlè, Infa-Red, Cross, new signee Fiend, and Yung Wun, who by this time was signed to Ruff Ryders' subsidiary independent label, Ryde or Die Records. Production was handled by Jay "Icepick" Jackson, Swizz Beatz, Mahog, P.K., Jadakiss, Sheek, and DJ Shok, with Dee and Waah Dean and Icepick handling executive production. In October of that year, Ruff Ryders Television & Film released the Ruff Ryders Documentary, which detailed the launching of the company as well as following the lives of the artists signed to the label.

In 2002, Ruff Ryders signed Jin, a Miami, Florida born Chinese rapper who rose to prominence through winning many Freestyle Fridays rap battles on BET's 106 & Park.

In 2003, Ruff Ryders' deal with Interscope Records ended, though Jadakiss, Eve and Styles remained on Interscope. On July 14, 2003, it was announced and confirmed that Ruff Ryders signed a joint venture deal with Virgin Records. As a result of the transition, the lone release from Ruff Ryders that year was DMX's Grand Champ, which was released as DMX's deal was with Def Jam. The album featured guest appearances from Swizz Beatz, Styles P, Infa-Red & Cross, Drag-On, Eve, Jadakiss, Sheek, and former Ruff Ryders artist Big Stan, who left the label to sign to DMX's Bloodline Records. Among others, production was handled by Ruff Ryders producers Swizz Beatz and Mr. Devine, and former Ruff Ryders producer Dame Grease, with executive production by Ruff Ryders executives Joaquin "Waah" and Darrin "Dee" Dean, Craig Brodhead, and Jay "Icepick" Jackson. The album continued DMX's streak of number one albums. Grand Champ was certified platinum by the RIAA, with over one million copies sold in America. It was the final album by Ruff Ryders to achieve platinum status. Around this time, rumors began to circulate that there was turmoil in the Ruff Ryders camp. This was due to Swizz Beatz and DMX focusing more on their own record labels, Full Surface Records and Bloodline Records, as well as The LOX pushing their D-Block movement. Eve, at this time, became more involved in acting and signed to Dr. Dre's Aftermath Entertainment in a joint deal with Ruff Ryders; Drag-On hadn't released an album since 2000's Opposite of H2O, and Sheek Louch had released his album, 2003's Walk Witt Me through D-Block instead of Ruff Ryders. These rumors were to put to rest by Sheek, Waah, and Dee, who insisted that there were no issues inside the camp.

The first release from Ruff Ryders under the Virgin deal was Drag-On's second studio album, Hell and Back, released in February 2004. The album featured appearances from Ruff Ryders artists Eve, DMX, Styles, Jadakiss and Swizz Beatz, who also provided production on the album. As a result of low promotion, Hell and Back was a commercial failure, only peaking at number 47 on the Billboard top 200 and failing to achieve gold status in America. Jin's debut album, The Rest Is History, was delayed multiple times before its October 2004 release. Upon release, the album was also a commercial failure, only selling 20,000 units in its first week and peaking at number 54 on the Billboard top 200. Contributing factors to the album failing were lack of promotion from Virgin Records and the online music piracy crisis of the 2000s. The failure of both albums led to Ruff Ryders parting ways with Virgin Records.

Ruff Ryders also had other albums that were scheduled to be released but were ultimately shelved. These albums include Love and War by Parlè (which was scheduled to be released on April 4, 2000, as found in the booklet of Drag-On's Opposite of H2O), and Emergency by Infa-Red and Cross (as found in the booklet of DMX's Grand Champ). Fiend was also going to release The Addiction on the label, but left Ruff Ryders in 2002, and released the album independently in 2006.

=== 2005–09: Decline ===
2005 saw two releases from Ruff Ryders, with the first being Vol. 4: The Redemption, released through independent record company Artemis Records. The album peaked at number 40 on the Billboard top 200 and sold around 25,000 copies in its first week. It was the only Ruff Ryders album released through Artemis. The other album released through Ruff Ryders in 2005 was Sheek Louch's After Taxes. The album fared better than Vol.4, but failed to achieve an RIAA certification.

That same year, DMX began working on his sixth studio album, then titled Here We Go Again. Though the album was initially scheduled to be release through Def Jam, tension between DMX and then-Def Jam president Jay-Z led to DMX leaving Def Jam. The album, now titled Year of the Dog... Again, was released in August 2006 through Ruff Ryders, Sony Urban Music and Columbia Records. The album debuted at number 2 on the Billboard top 200 but failed to achieve the same success that DMX previously achieved, only selling 345,000 copies. Also in 2006, Jin left the label as well as Drag-On who left to join Swizz Beatz's Full Surface Records.

Ruff Ryders released Styles P's Super Gangster (Extraordinary Gentleman) in 2007 and Jadakiss's The Last Kiss in 2009 through Interscope Records and Def Jam Recordings, respectively The Last Kiss was the last album released by Ruff Ryders before going on a 12-year hiatus. With not having a distribution deal and changing musical trends, the label paused releasing music and instead focused on the Ruff Ryders Lifestyle motorcycle brand and other business ventures.

=== 2021–present: Resurgence ===
In April 2021, Ruff Ryders' first artist, DMX, collapsed and died of a cocaine induced heart attack. At the time of his passing, he was working on his eighth studio album, Exodus. The album was released in May 2021 through Ruff Ryders, with primary production from Swizz Beatz and guest appearances by The LOX. It was the first release by the label after Jadakiss' 2009 album The Last Kiss, and was a top 10 release on the Billboard 200. Angela Simmons signed a contract with the label and released her debut single, titled "Run To", in 2026.

== Headquarters ==
Ruff Ryders centralized its creative operations in Yonkers by establishing its landmark Powerhouse Studios facility at 33 South Broadway there. The studio served as the primary recording hub for the collective's early regional compilation projects and solo tracking sessions for native talent.

== Roster ==
The label's early strategy relied heavily on the Yonkers street-rap scene, drawing directly from a local pipeline of talent that grew up together in the municipality. This local proximity allowed the Dean siblings to secure management over hometown native flagship acts like DMX and the hip-hop trio The LOX simultaneously.

Artists

- DMX (1991–2021) (deceased) (RAL/Island Def Jam/Def Jam/Ruff Ryders)
- Eve (Interscope/Ruff Ryders)
- The LOX
- Drag-On (Virgin/Interscope/Ruff Ryders)
- Fiend (Interscope/Ruff Ryders)
- Murda Ma$e
- Swizz Beatz
- Angela Simmons
- Infa-Red & Cross (Interscope/Def Jam/Ruff Ryders)
- MC Jin
- Yung Wun (through Ruff Ryders' subsidiary label Ryde or Die Records)
- J.Life (unreleased)
- Big Stan
- Loose
- Parlè (Interscope/Ruff Ryders)
- Larsiny (Akbar, Shiz Lansky, and Cassidy) (through Ruff Ryders' subsidiary label TD Entertainment)
- Jadakiss (D-Block/Def Jam/Roc Nation/Interscope/Ruff Ryders)
- Styles P (D-Block/Roc Nation/Koch/Nature Sounds/Interscope/Ruff Ryders)
- Sheek Louch (D-Block/Roc Nation/Def Jam/Koch/Ruff Ryders)

=== In house producers ===
- DJ Iroc
- DJ Shok/Shok
- P.K./P. Killer Trackz
- Dame Grease (Vacant Lot/Ruff Ryders)
- Icepick Jay (deceased)
- Swizz Beatz
- Teflon
- Mahogany
- TJ Beatz
- Wayne-O
- Darrin Dean (exec.)
- Joaquin "Waah" Dean (exec.)
- Chivon Dean (exec.)

=== Staff ===
- Keisha Gibbs
- Ignatius "Icepick Jay" Jackson (deceased)
- Leota Blacknor
- Joaquin "Waah" Dean (founder, executive producer)
- Darrin "Dee" Dean (founder, executive producer, stylist)
- Chivon Dean (founder, executive producer)

== Releases ==
=== Studio albums ===
| Artist | Album | Details |
|---|---|---|
| DMX | It's Dark And Hell Is Hot | Released: May 12, 1998; Chart position: #1 U.S.; RIAA certification: 4× Platinum |
| DMX | Flesh of My Flesh, Blood of My Blood | Released: December 22, 1998; Chart position: #1 U.S.; RIAA certification: 3× Platinum |
| Eve | Let There Be Eve...Ruff Ryders' First Lady | Released: September 14, 1999; Chart position: #1 U.S.; RIAA certification: 2× Platinum |
| DMX | ...And Then There Was X | Released: December 21, 1999; Chart position: #1 U.S.; RIAA certification: 5× Platinum |
| The Lox | We Are the Streets | Released: January 25, 2000; Chart position: #5 U.S.; RIAA certification: Gold |
| Drag-On | Opposite of H2O | Released: March 28, 2000; Chart position: #5 U.S.; RIAA certification: Gold |
| Eve | Scorpion | Released: March 6, 2001; Chart position: #4 U.S.; RIAA certification: Platinum |
| Jadakiss | Kiss tha Game Goodbye | Released: August 7, 2001; Chart position: #5 U.S.; RIAA certification: Gold |
| DMX | The Great Depression | Released: October 23, 2001; Chart position: #1 U.S.; RIAA certification: Platinum |
| Styles P | A Gangster and a Gentleman | Released: July 9, 2002; Chart position: #6 U.S.; RIAA certification: Gold |
| Eve | Eve-Olution | Released: August 27, 2002; Chart position: #6 U.S.; RIAA certification: Gold |
| DMX | Grand Champ | Released: September 16, 2003; Chart position: #1 U.S.; RIAA certification: Platinum |
| Drag-On | Hell and Back | Released: February 10, 2004; Chart position: #47 U.S. |
| Jadakiss | Kiss of Death | Released: June 22, 2004; Chart position: #1 U.S.; RIAA certification:Platinum |
| Jin | The Rest Is History | Released: October 19, 2004; Chart position: #54 U.S. |
| Sheek Louch | After Taxes | Released: November 8, 2005; Chart position: #23 U.S. |
| DMX | Year of the Dog... Again | Released: August 1, 2006; Chart position: #2 U.S. |
| Styles P | Time is Money | Released: December 19, 2006; Chart position: #79 U.S. |
| Styles P | Super Gangster (Extraordinary Gentleman) | Released: December 4, 2007; Chart position: #52 U.S. |
| Jadakiss | The Last Kiss | Released: April 7, 2009; Chart position: #3 U.S. |
| DMX | Exodus | Released: May 28, 2021; Chart position: #8 U.S. |

=== Compilations ===
| Artist | Album | Details |
|---|---|---|
| Ruff Ryders | Ryde or Die Vol. 1 | Released: April 27, 1999; Chart position: #1 U.S.; RIAA certification: Platinum |
| Ruff Ryders | Ryde or Die Vol. 2 | Released: July 4, 2000; Chart position: #2 U.S.; RIAA certification: Platinum |
| Ruff Ryders | Ryde or Die Vol. 3: In the "R" We Trust | Released: December 18, 2001; Chart position: #34 U.S. |
| Ruff Ryders | Vol. 4: The Redemption | Released: July 26, 2005 |
| DMX | The Definition of X: The Pick of the Litter | Released: June 12, 2007 (US); Chart position: #26 U.S.; BPI: Silver |
| DMX | The Best of DMX | Released: January 26, 2010 (US); Chart position: #2 U.S.; BPI: Silver |
| Ruff Ryders | Ruff Ryders: Past, Present, Future | Released: November 21, 2011 (US) |

== See also ==
- Bloodline Records founded by DMX
- Full Surface Records founded by Swizz Beatz
- D-Block Records founded by The LOX
