= Cassidy discography =

- Studio albums: 4
- Extended plays: 1
- Compilation albums: 1
- Singles: 15
- Music videos: 7
- Mixtapes: 12

The discography of American rapper Cassidy, consists of four studio albums, one compilation album, one extended play (EP), 12 mixtapes and 15 singles (including five as a featured artist).

== Albums ==
=== Studio albums ===
List of albums, with selected chart positions, sales figures and certifications
Title	Album details	Peak chart positions				Sales	Certifications
Title	Album details	US	US R&B	US Rap	UK	Sales	Certifications
Split Personality	Released: March 16, 2004; Label: Full Surface, J; Format: CD, LP, cassette, digital download	2	1	*	104	118,000 (First Week)	RIAA: Gold
I'm a Hustla	Released: June 28, 2005; Label: Full Surface, J; Format: CD, LP, digital download	5	2	2	—	93,000 (First week)	
B.A.R.S. The Barry Adrian Reese Story	Released: November 6, 2007; Label: Full Surface, J; Format: CD, LP, digital download	10	3	2	—	63,000 (First Week)	
C.A.S.H.	Released: November 16, 2010; Label: Kross Over, Larsiny Family, E1 Music; Format: CD, digital download	145	19	11	—	5,198 (First Week)	
Da Science	Released: October 6, 2020; Label: Mayhem Music; Format: CD, digital download	—	—	—	—		
Da Formula	Released: December 8, 2020; Label: Mayhem Music; Format: CD, digital download	—	—	—	—		
Da Wiseman	Released: February 18, 2021; Label: Mayhem Music; Format: CD, digital download	—	—	—	—		
"—" denotes a recording that did not chart or was not released in that territory.

=== Compilation albums ===
Title	Album details
The Best of the Hustla	Released: July 17, 2007; Label: CMP; Format: CD, LP, digital download

== Extended plays ==
Title	EP details
Face 2 Face EP	Released: August 24, 2010; Label: E1 Music; Format: Digital download

== Mixtapes ==
Title	Mixtape details
The Hustlas Home	Released: June 5, 2007; Format: Digital download; Hosted by DJ Big Mike & DJ Thoro
07-07-07 (Happy Birthday)	Released: July 7, 2007; Format: Digital download; Hosted by DJ Green Lantern
Put Ya L in the Sky (with Larsiny Family)	Released: January 18, 2008; Format: Digital download; Hosted by DJ Big Mike & DJ Thoro
07-07-08 (Happy Birthday Extended Edition)	Released: July 7, 2008; Format: Digital download; Hosted by DJ Green Lantern
Back to the Problem	Released: July 21, 2008; Format: Digital download; Hosted by DJ Big Mike & DJ Thoro
Apply Pressure (Raw & Uncut)	Released: May 23, 2009; Format: Digital download; Hosted by Carmelo Anthony, DJ Big Mike & DJ Thoro
The Problem Is Back	Released: December 11, 2009; Format: Digital download; Hosted by DJ Big Mike & DJ Thoro
Apply Pressure 2	Released: February 5, 2010; Format: Digital download; Hosted by DJ Big Mike & DJ Thoro
Mayhem Music: AP3	Released: July 8, 2012; Format: Digital download; Hosted by DJ Thoro
Don't Trust Anyone	Released: August 13, 2013; Format: Digital download; Hosted by DJ YJ
Don't Trust Anyone 2 (Raw & Uncut)	Released: January 26, 2015; Format: Digital download; Hosted by DJ YJ
Don't Trust Anyone 3	Released: December 28, 2015; Format: Digital download; Hosted by DJ YJ
Da BARbarian	Released: October 12, 2016; Format: Digital download
Banana Clips Vol. 1	Released: July 13, 2018; Format: Digital download
Banana Clips Vol. 2	Released: April 26, 2019; Format: Digital download
Numbers	Released: July 7, 2019; Format: Digital download

== Singles ==
=== As lead artist ===
List of singles, with selected chart positions and certifications, showing year released and album name
Title	Year	Peak chart positions										Certifications	Album
Title	Year	US	US R&B	US Rap	AUS	GER	IRE	NL	SWE	SWI	UK	Certifications	Album
"Hotel" (featuring R. Kelly)	2003	4	6	2	25	22	16	70	24	28	3	BPI: Silver	Split Personality
"Take It"	2003	—	—	—	—	—	—	—	—	—	—		Non-album single
"Get No Better" (featuring Mashonda)	2004	79	51	25	—	76	21	—	—	—	24		Split Personality
"I'm a Hustla"	2005	34	8	5	—	38	—	—	—	—	—	RIAA: Platinum (Mastertone); Gold (Digital)	I'm a Hustla
"B-Boy Stance" (featuring Swizz Beatz)	2005	—	75	—	—	64	—	—	—	—	—		I'm a Hustla
"My Drink n My 2 Step" (featuring Swizz Beatz)	2007	33	11	6	—	—	—	—	—	—	—		B.A.R.S. The Barry Adrian Reese Story
"Innocent Man (Misunderstood)" (featuring Mark Morrison)	2007	—	103	—	—	—	—	—	—	—	—		B.A.R.S. The Barry Adrian Reese Story
"Stand Up (The Sean Bell Tribute Song)" (with Swizz Beatz, Maino, Styles P, Talib Kweli and Drag-On)	2008	—	—	—	—	—	—	—	—	—	—		Non-album single
"Face 2 Face"	2010	—	—	—	—	—	—	—	—	—	—		C.A.S.H.
"Drumma Bass"	2010	—	77	—	—	—	—	—	—	—	—		C.A.S.H.
"We Workin'" (featuring Jag)	2013	—	—	—	—	—	—	—	—	—	—		Mayhem Music: AP3
"1 Foot In the Grave" (featuring BishopMakeItKnock)	2018	—	—	—	—	—	—	—	—	—	—		Non-album single
"—" denotes a recording that did not chart or was not released in that territory.	2018												

=== As featured artist ===
List of singles, with selected chart positions and certifications, showing year released and album name
Title	Year	Peak chart positions				Album
Title	Year	US	US R&B	US Rap	UK	Album
"Bigger Business" (Swizz Beatz featuring Baby, Jadakiss, P. Diddy, Snoop Dogg, Ronald Isley, Cassidy and TQ)	2002	—	72	—	—	Swizz Beatz Presents G.H.E.T.T.O. Stories
"Don't Care Who Knows" (Keisha White featuring Cassidy)	2005	—	—	—	29	Seventeen
"Come and Get Me" (Swizz Beatz featuring Cassidy)	2007	—	—	—	—	Non-album singles
"If You Love Me" (DJ Absolut featuring Havoc, Sheek Louch, Joell Ortiz and Cassidy)	2010	—	—	—	—	Non-album singles
"En Off Shore" (Prince Negaafellaga featuring Cassidy)	2010	—	—	—	—	L'Etoffe des Héros
"Coast to Coast" (Infamous Haze featuring Cassidy, Joell Ortiz, Dominic, Nipsey Hussle and Dro Pesci)	2013	—	—	—	—	Non-album single
"—" denotes a recording that did not chart or was not released in that territory.

== Guest appearances ==
List of non-single guest appearances, with other performing artists, showing year released and album name
Title	Year	Other performer(s)	Album
"Nahmeanuheard" (Remix)	2002	N.O.R.E., Capone, Cam'ron, Fat Joe	God Favorite
"Salute Me" (Remix)	2002	Nas, Fat Joe	Swizz Beatz Presents G.H.E.T.T.O. Stories
"My Love Is Like...Wo" (Remix)	2003	Mýa	—N/a
"Celebrate"	2003	Wyclef Jean, Patti LaBelle	The Preacher's Son
"Ride Out"	2003	Swizz Beatz	—N/a
"If There's Any Justice" (Remix)	2004	Lemar	—N/a
"One More Day in the Hood"	2004	Yung Wun	The Dirtiest Thirstiest
"State Your Name, Gangsta"	2004	The Game, Lil Flip	Westside Story: the Compton Chronicles
"18"	2004	Mario	Turning Point
"Aim For the Head"	2004	The Game, Swizz Beatz	—N/a
"Shawty"	2004	ATL	The ATL Project
"Where You Are/Glamarous Life"	2005	Naam Brigade, E-Ness	—N/a
"Liberty Bell"	2006	DJ Clue, Beanie Sigel, Freeway	The Professional 3
"Can You Handle It"	2006	Merlino, Bipper	—N/a
"Psycho (Get Hype)"	2007	Busta Rhymes, Papoose	—N/a
"No One" (Remix)	2007	Alicia Keys	—N/a
"No Rules"	2007	DJ Drama, Beanie Sigel	—N/a
"How Do I Breathe" (Remix)	2007	Mario	—N/a
"No Hook"	2007	DJ Khaled, Jim Jones, Rob Cash, Styles P	We the Best
"We Hit Um (N.W.A.)"	2007	Maino, Uncle Murda	—N/a
"Girlfriend" (Remix)	2007	Bow Wow, Omarion, Soulja Boy Tell 'Em, Swizz Beatz	—N/a
"Nobody Do It Better" (Remix)	2007	Keith Murray, Tyrese	—N/a
"Set It Off" (Remix)	2007	N.O.R.E., Swizz Beatz, Red Café, Busta Rhymes, Talib Kweli	—N/a
"Down 2 Ride"	2008	Shelley	—N/a
"Hustler's Poster Child"	2008	Fabolous	There Is No Competition
"Hop Out"	2008	Frankie Krutches	—N/a
"Lookin Boy" (Remix)	2008	Hot Stylz, Yung Joc, R. Kelly	—N/a
"Nowhere Left to Go"	2008	Leona Lewis	—N/a
"Keepin' It Gangsta"	2008	Getto	—N/a
"Big Chips"	2008	Deemi	—N/a
"Gun Shopping"	2008	Tuge, Uncle Murda	—N/a
"Monster Music (G.H.E.T.T.O.)"	2010	Mos Def	—N/a
"Gold Digger"	2010	112	—N/a
"In the Ghetto"	2010	DJ Kay Slay, Fat Joe, Jim Jones, Shaq Diesel, Sheek Louch	—N/a
"Get Cake"	2010	Tyrese	—N/a
"Go Hard"	2010	Vado	Slime Pays
"Cheese and Crackers" (Remix)	2010	Ron Browz, J.R. Writer	—N/a
"G.O.A.T."	2010	J.R. Writer	—N/a
"Parachute"	2010	STS, RL (of Next)	Demand More 2
"I'm So Crazy" (Remix)	2010	Junior Reid	—N/a
"7 Days"	2010	Water	—N/a
"Fresh Fly"	2010	Waka Flocka Flame	—N/a
"That Work (For The Streets)"	2010	DJ Suss-One Uncle Murda, French Montana, Joell Ortiz, Vado	—N/a
"Goin' Back"	2010	1982 (Statik Selektah & Termanology), Xzibit	1982
"Wake Up Fucked Up"	2011	DJ Thoro, D-Lo, Jadakiss	—N/a
"My Hood"	2011	Jim Jones, Juelz Santana	Monster Mondays Vol. 1
"Personal"	2012	Murda Mook	Street Smart
"Get Cake"	2012	Tyrese	Invisible Bully: The Lost Tapes
"How to Grind"	2012	Su Da Boss	Air Bossin
"Bars on Deck"	2012	J.R. Writer	ET:Extra-Terrestrial Musik
"Homicide"	2012	J.R. Writer	ET:Extra-Terrestrial Musik
"She Got It All"	2012	Bobby V	Dusk Till Dawn
"Gun Charge"	2012	Compton Menace	Menace 2 Society Vol.2
"Million Dollar Dreams"	2012	DJ Kay Slay, Murda Mook, Loaded Lux, J.R. Writer	Grown Man Hip-Hop
"La recette"	2012	Swift Guad, Haitem	The Narvalow Tape
"Whenever You See Me"	2014	Lil' Kim	Hard Core 2k14
"Bars"	2014	Mani Miles, Murda Mook	—N/a
