= Brothers of Soul =

- Origin: Detroiit, Michigan, U.S.
- Genres: Soul
- Years active: 1967–1975
- Labels: Zodiac Records; Boo Records
- Past members: Fred Bridges; Richard Knight; Robert Eaton; Ben Knight

Brothers of Soul was an American soul trio composed of Fred Bridges, Richard Knight, and Robert Eaton, who were also a songwriting team involved with around 50 singles. Based in Detroit in the 1960s and 1970s, they recorded a number of songs, mainly with producer Ric Williams for Zodiac Records and Boo Records. Their biggest hit was "I Guess That Don't Make Me a Loser," which peaked at No. 32 on the R&B chart in May 1968.

== History ==
Bridges and Knight, who had met at the Dodge assembly plant in Detroit, did some writing for La Beat Records, where they began working with Eaton. The first song the three are credited on together is James Shorter's "Modern Day Woman". They then wrote a song named "Dream." While doing some freelance work for Drew Records, writing for The Precisions, they met Chicago-based producer Williams, who became interested in showcasing them as a group. Williams began Zodiac sometime in the 60s or 70s. They chose to record under the name Brothers of Soul, a name inspired by the Detroit riots of '67. Under the coordination of Williams, they wrote for Zodiac, producing many Ruby Andrews hits. Their most successful period was from 1968 to 1969, with their last recordings in 1971. Sometime during this period, Ben Knights replaced Richard Knight, who was serving time in prison in New York. They continued to work together, providing vocal accompaniment for a few years and eventually split. A hits compilation named I Guess That Don't Make Me a Loser was released on CD in 1995 by Collectables Records and digitally in 2008 by S.D.E.G. Records.

== Partial discography ==
=== Chart singles ===
Year	A-side	Chart Positions
Year	A-side	US R&B
1968	"I Guess That Don't Make Me a Loser"	32

=== Compilation album ===
- I Guess That Don't Make Me a Loser
