= Tear It Up (Yung Wun song) =

Single by Yung Wun featuring DMX, Lil' Flip and David Banner

from the album The Dirtiest Thirstiest
- Released: April 6, 2004
- Recorded: 2004
- Genre: Hardcore hip-hop
- Length: 3:25
- Label: Full Surface; J
- Songwriters: Hal Davis; Don Fletcher; Dean Parks; Lavell William Crump; Bernard Freeman; Lil Flip; James L Anderson; Dallas Austin; Jasper Cameron; Luis Matos; Todd Shaw; Earl Simmons
- Producer: Faust

Yung Wun singles chronology
"Yung Wun Anthem" (2004)	"Tear It Up" (2004)	"Walk It, Talk It" (2004)

David Banner singles chronology
"Crank It Up" (2004)	"Tear It Up" (2004)	"Walk It, Talk It" (2004)

DMX singles chronology
"Get It on the Floor" (2003)	"Tear It Up" (2004)	"We in Here" (2006)

Lil' Flip singles chronology
"Like a Pimp" (2003)	"Tear It Up" (2004)	"Never Really Was" (2004)

"Tear It Up" is the second single from rapper Yung Wun's debut album, The Dirtiest Thirstiest. It features DMX, Lil' Flip and David Banner.

The song samples and interpolates "Dancing Machine" by the Jackson 5 taken from the performance in the film Drumline without credit.

== Reception ==
Pedro 'DJ Complejo' Hernandez of Rap Reviews admired the album's ability to "captures everything good about Swizz' production" and the high-energy performances by Yung Wun, and guests David Banner and Lil' Flip. Hernandez concluded that the album didn't have anything "overly impressive on paper, but Yung Wun's style and energy are what should really sell him as an emcee".

Yahoo Entertainment, ranking "20 Best DMX Features" in 2023, placed "Tear It Up" at number seventeenth.

== Charts ==
It peaked at No. 76 on the Billboard Hot 100, making it his only single to chart there and his most successful single to date.

Chart (2004)	Peak position
US Billboard Hot 100	76
US Hot R&B/Hip-Hop Songs (Billboard)	39
US Hot Rap Songs (Billboard)	21
US Rhythmic Airplay (Billboard)	26

== Release history ==
Region	Date	Format(s)	Label(s)	Ref.
United States	March 29, 2004	Rhythmic contemporary radio	J	
United States	April 19, 2004	Urban contemporary radio	J	
