= Grand Champ =

Studio album by DMX
- Released: September 16, 2003
- Genre: East Coast hip-hop
- Length: 74:40
- Labels: Ruff Ryders; Def Jam; Island Def Jam
- Producers: DMX (also exec.); Tony Pizarro; DJ Salam Wreck; Kanye West; No I.D.; Tuneheadz; Rockwilder; Ron Browz; Swizz Beatz; Dame Grease; PK; Darrin Dean (exec.); Joaquin "Waah" Dean (exec.); Jay "Icepick" Jackson (exec.); Craig Brodhead (exec.); Tina M. Davis (exec.)

DMX chronology
The Great Depression (2001)	Grand Champ (2003)	Year of the Dog… Again (2006)

Singles from Grand Champ
- 1. "Where the Hood At?" Released: August 5, 2003; 2. "Get It on the Floor" Released: December 30, 2003

Grand Champ is the fifth studio album by American rapper DMX. It was released on September 16, 2003 by The Island Def Jam Music Group, Def Jam Recordings, and Ruff Ryders Entertainment. The album was produced by multiple producers, including Swizz Beatz, Dame Grease, Kanye West, and No I.D. It features guest appearances from 50 Cent, Cam'ron, Eve, Styles P, Monica, and Jadakiss, among others.

Grand Champ was supported by two singles: "Where the Hood At?" and "Get It on the Floor". Despite receiving generally mixed reviews from music critics, the album was a commercial success. It debuted at number one on the US Billboard 200 chart, selling 312,000 copies in its first week.

== Singles ==
The album was supported by two singles. The first single, "Where the Hood At?" was released on August 5, 2003. The single peaked at number 68 on the US Billboard Hot 100 and number 24 on the US Hot R&B/Hip-Hop Songs charts respectively. The single also peaked at number 16 on the UK Singles Chart, becoming his second top 20 song on that chart. The second single, "Get It on the Floor" was released on December 30, 2003. The song was produced by and features a guest appearance by Swizz Beatz. The single failed to chart on the Billboard Hot 100 but managed to peak at number 57 on the US Hot R&B/Hip-Hop Songs and number 34 on the UK Singles Chart, becoming his fifth UK top 40.

=== Other songs ===
On the international version of the album "X Gon' Give It to Ya" was added as a bonus track. The single was originally released on December 10, 2002. It served as the theme song for the 2003 film "Cradle 2 the Grave" which DMX also starred in. The song peaked at number 60 on the US Billboard Hot 100 and number 23 on the US Hot R&B/Hip-Hop Songs charts respectively. The song also peaked at number six on the UK Singles Chart, becoming his only UK top-ten hit.

== Critical reception ==
Professional ratings
Aggregate scores
Source	Rating
Metacritic	58/100
Review scores
Source	Rating
AllMusic	3.5/5 stars
Blender	3/5 stars
E!	C+
Entertainment Weekly	C−
Mojo	3.5/5 stars
Playlouder	2/5 stars
RapReviews	7/10
Rolling Stone	3/5 stars
USA Today	3/4 stars
Vibe	3.5/5 stars

Grand Champ received generally mixed reviews from music critics. At Metacritic, which assigns a normalized rating out of 100 to reviews from professional publications, the album received an average score of 58, based on twelve reviews. Jason Birchmeier of AllMusic praised DMX's effort stating that, "It's a well-crafted and thought-out album but feels like a sequel, and as such, it serves its purpose: to satisfy fans and move units." But Birchmeier also stated that it was "Not quite the big comeback DMX needed at this point in his quietly sagging rap career." In addition, he stated that, "Longtime fans may decide to drop off at about this point, if they hadn't already, while those content with the usual—or new to DMX—should find plenty to savor on Grand Champ." Birchmeier ultimately give the album a 3.5 star rating out of 5.

== Commercial performance ==
Grand Champ debuted at number one on the US Billboard 200 chart, selling 312,000 copies in its first week, according to Nielsen Soundscan. This became DMX's fifth and final US number one debut on the chart. In its second week, the album dropped to number seven on the chart, selling an additional 150,000 copies. On November 7, 2003, the album was certified platinum by the Recording Industry Association of America (RIAA) for shipments and sales of over one million copies in the US. As of October 2009, the album has sold 1,204,000 copies in the United States. To date, it is DMX's final album to achieve a certification from the RIAA.

== Track listing ==
Credits adapted from the album's liner notes.

No.	Title	Writer(s)	Producer(s)	Length
1.	"Dog Intro" (featuring Bashir Fadai)	Earl Simmons; Darold Trotter	Darold "Pop" Trotter	3:32
2.	"My Life" (featuring Chinky)	Simmons; John Parker; Talia Burgess	Dart La	3:09
3.	"Where the Hood At?"	Simmons; Franklin Crum; Eriberio Serrano; Antonio Hardy	Tuneheadz	4:46
4.	"Dogs Out"	Simmons; Kanye West; Ralph Bass; Lowman Pauling	Kanye West	4:03
5.	"Get It on the Floor" (featuring Swizz Beatz)	Simmons; Kasseem Dean	Swizz Beatz	4:22
6.	"Come Prepared" (Skit)		Joaquin "Waah" Dean; Jay "Icepick" Jackson	0:35
7.	"Shot Down" (featuring 50 Cent and Styles P)	Simmons; Salaam Nassar; David Styles; Curtis Jackson	DJ Salam Wreck	3:42
8.	"Bring the Noize"	Simmons; Crum; Serrano	Tuneheadz	3:30
9.	"Untouchable" (featuring Syleena Johnson, Cross, Infa-Red, Sheek and Drag-On)	Simmons; Tony Pizarro; J. Lucien; Sean Jacobs; Shandel Green; Shawn Martin; Melvin Smalls	Tony Pizarro; Black Moses^{[a]}	6:05
10.	"Fuck Y'all"	Simmons; Rondell Tuner; Lou Courtney	Ron Browz	3:43
11.	"Ruff Radio" (Skit)		Joaquin "Waah" Dean; Jay "Icepick" Jackson	0:43
12.	"We're Back" (featuring Eve and Jadakiss)	Simmons; Crum; Serrano; Eve Jeffers; Jason Phillips	Tuneheadz	4:25
13.	"Ruff Radio 2" (Skit)		Joaquin "Waah" Dean; Jay "Icepick" Jackson	0:18
14.	"Rob All Night (If I'm Gonna Rob)"	Simmons; Dana Stinson	Rockwilder	3:27
15.	"We Go Hard" (featuring Cam'ron)	Simmons; Dion Wilson; Cameron Giles; Fred Bridges; Richard Knight; Robert Eaton; Ric Williams	No I.D.	3:36
16.	"We 'Bout to Blow" (featuring Big Stan)	Simmons; Damon Blackman; Dennis Joyner; Clarence Reid	Dame Grease	3:31
17.	"The Rain"	Simmons; George Spivey; Leonard Perry; Katie Davis; Mallory Cowart	DJ Scratch	3:27
18.	"Gotta Go" (Skit)		Joaquin "Waah" Dean; Jay "Icepick" Jackson	1:07
19.	"Don't Gotta Go Home" (featuring Monica)	Antoine Macon; Ryan Bowser; Simmons	Antoine "Bam" Macon; Ryan Bowser; Mr. Devine^{[b]}; Victor Flowers^{[b]}	4:17
20.	"A'Yo Kato" (featuring Magic and Val)	Simmons; Dean; Floyd Massey; Valerie Rangel	Swizz Beatz	3:46
21.	"Thank You" (featuring Patti LaBelle)	Simmons; Ron Holden; Niem Washington	DMX; Ron H; Nemo; Gerald Flowers^{[b]}; Victor Flowers^{[b]}; Reggie Flowers^{[b]}	3:01
22.	"Prayer V"	Simmons	DMX	1:47
23.	"On Top" (featuring Big Stan)	Simmons; Jermaine Russ; Joyner	Mac G	3:34
24.	"X Gon' Give It to Ya" (International Bonus Track)	Simmons; Shatek King	Shatek	3:38

Notes

- ^{^[a]} signifies a co-producer.
- ^{^[a]} signifies an additional producer.

Sample credits

- "Where the Hood At?" contains an interpolation of "Young, Gifted & Black", written by Antonio Hardy.
- "Dogs Out" contains a sample of "Dedicated to the One I Love", written by Ralph Bass and Lowman Pauling, and performed by Stacy Lattisaw.
- "Untouchable" contains an interpolation of "Why You Treat Me So Bad", written by Jay King, Denzil Foster, and Thomas McElroy.
- "Fuck Y'all" contains a sample of "What Do You Want Me To Do", written by Lou Courtney, and performed by Ben E. King.
- "We Go Hard" contains a sample of "Didn't I Fool You", written by Fred Bridges, Richard Knight, Robert Eaton, and Ric Williams, and performed by Ruby Andrews.
- "We 'Bout to Blow" contains a sample of "Sesame Street", written by Clarence Reid, and performed by Blowfly.
- "The Rain" contains a sample of "Will She Meet The Train in the Rain", written by Leonard Perry, Katie Davis, and Mallory Cowart, and performed by Greg Perry.
- "Thank You" contains a sample of "Make the Music With Your Mouth", written by Marcel Hall and Marlon Williams, performed by Biz Markie. It also contains a sample of "I Want To Thank You" written by Kevin McCord, and performed by Alicia Myers.

== Charts ==
=== Weekly charts ===
Chart (2003)	Peak position
Australian Albums (ARIA)	32
Austrian Albums (Ö3 Austria)	20
Belgian Albums (Ultratop Flanders)	38
Canadian Albums (Billboard)	2
Canadian R&B Albums (Nielsen SoundScan)	13
Dutch Albums (Album Top 100)	28
French Albums (SNEP)	16
German Albums (Offizielle Top 100)	6
Irish Albums (IRMA)	8
New Zealand Albums (RMNZ)	7
Scottish Albums (Official Charts)	6
Swedish Albums (Sverigetopplistan)	42
Swiss Albums (Schweizer Hitparade)	10
UK Albums (Official Charts)	6
UK R&B Albums (Official Charts)	1
US Billboard 200	1
US Top R&B/Hip-Hop Albums (Billboard)	1

=== Year-end charts ===
Chart (2003)	Position
Swiss Albums (Schweizer Hitparade)	96
UK Albums (OCC)	172
US Billboard 200	76
US Top R&B/Hip-Hop Albums (Billboard)	39
Chart (2004)	Position
US Top R&B/Hip-Hop Albums (Billboard)	97

== Certifications ==
Region	Certification	Certified units/sales
Canada (Music Canada)	Platinum	100,000^{^}
Germany (BVMI)	Gold	100,000^{‡}
United Kingdom (BPI)	Gold	187,401
United States (RIAA)	Platinum	1,000,000^{^}
^{^} Shipments figures based on certification alone.^{‡} Sales+streaming figures based on certification alone.
