= The Little Prince (soundtrack) =

The Little Prince (Original Motion Picture Soundtrack)

Soundtrack album by Hans Zimmer, Richard Harvey and Camille
- Released: March 11, 2016
- Recorded: 2015
- Studios: AIR; Battery
- Genre: Film soundtrack
- Length: 69:59
- Label: WaterTower Music
- Producers: Hans Zimmer; Richard Harvey; Stephen Lipson

Hans Zimmer chronology
Kung Fu Panda 3 (2015)	The Little Prince (Original Motion Picture Soundtrack) (2016)	Batman v Superman: Dawn of Justice (2016)

Richard Harvey chronology
Curse of the Phoenix (2014)	The Little Prince (2016)	Swung (2018)

The Little Prince (Original Motion Picture Soundtrack) is the soundtrack to the 2015 film The Little Prince, directed by Mark Osborne. The film's original score is composed by Hans Zimmer and Richard Harvey and featured original songs performed by Camille. The soundtrack was released through WaterTower Music on March 11, 2016.

== Critical reception ==
Brian Tallerico of RogerEbert.com wrote "the score, co-composed by Hans Zimmer, is a lyrical, lovely piece of work. It carries the viewer along, fluidly tying together the worlds of The Little Prince (both the girl's and the story of the prince)." Katy Waldman of Slate wrote "Richard Harvey and Hans Zimmer's twinkling celestial score sounds like a childhood music box heard through internal fog." Tim Grierson of Screen International summarized that the score "emphasises the film's big emotions".

Scott Foundas of Variety wrote "In lieu of traditional musical numbers, composers Hans Zimmer and Richard Harvey provide a suitably wispy, wistful underscore, interlaced with a few original ballads performed by French chanteuse Camille and several classic chansons francises from the immortal Charles Trenet." Leslie Felperin of The Hollywood Reporter wrote "The score credited to Hans Zimmer and Richard Harvey, featuring the voice of Camille has sweep without overwhelming the action". Stephen Holden of The New York Times called it as a "jazzy period score", while Aja Romano of Vox called it as a "lush score". Pete Hammond of Deadline Hollywood wrote "Hans Zimmer and Richard Harvey's score hits all the right notes in setting a sweet tone."

In contrast, Filmtracks criticized the soundtrack, writing: "the culmination of all these composers' efforts is a score that is sufficient in its pleasant, light-hearted tone but has frightfully little substance or narrative cohesion to its themes, the songs only throwing the soundtrack further into disarray."

== Track listing ==
The Little Prince (Original Motion Picture Soundtrack) track listing
No.	Title	Music	Artist	Length
1.	"Preparation"	Hans Zimmer; Richard Harvey		2:09
2.	"Turnaround"	Zimmer; Camille	Camille	3:26
3.	"The Life Plan"	Zimmer; Harvey		1:12
4.	"Driving"	Zimmer; Harvey		1:40
5.	"Equation"	Zimmer; Camille; Clément Ducol	Camille	2:03
6.	"The Interview"	Zimmer; Harvey		2:15
7.	"Le Tour de France en Diligence"	Zimmer; Camille; Nathan Stornetta	Camille	1:16
8.	"Plan B"	Zimmer; Harvey		0:36
9.	"Getting On with It"	Zimmer; Harvey		1:43
10.	"Amongst the Coins"	Zimmer; Harvey		2:36
11.	"Top Floor Please"	Zimmer; Harvey		0:57
12.	"Ascending"	Zimmer; Harvey		3:14
13.	"Parachutes"	Zimmer; Harvey		3:48
14.	"Draw Me a Sheep"	Zimmer; Harvey		3:39
15.	"Stars"	Zimmer; Harvey		0:25
16.	"The Fox"	Zimmer; Harvey		0:54
17.	"The Journey"	Zimmer; Harvey		2:35
18.	"The Absurd Waltz"	Zimmer; Harvey		4:07
19.	"Turnaround" (Reprise)	Zimmer; Camille	Camille	3:09
20.	"Recovery"	Zimmer; Harvey		1:47
21.	"Trapped Stars"	Zimmer; Harvey		4:00
22.	"Farewell"	Zimmer; Harvey		1:58
23.	"Escape"	Zimmer; Harvey		3:13
24.	"Finding the Rose"	Zimmer; Harvey		4:22
25.	"Growing Up"	Zimmer; Harvey		4:17
26.	"Suis-moi" (French version)	Zimmer; Camille	Camille	3:26
27.	"Equation" (French version)	Zimmer; Camille	Camille	2:03
28.	"Suis-moi" (Reprise; French version)	Zimmer; Camille	Camille	3:09
Total length:				69:59

== Personnel ==
Credits adapted from liner notes.

- Music – Hans Zimmer, Richard Harvey
- Additional music – Benjamin Wallfisch, Czarina Russell, Dominic Lewis, Ed Buller, Nathan Stornetta
- Producer – Hans Zimmer, Richard Harvey, Stephen Lipson
- Synth programming – Hans Zimmer
- Additional synth programming – David Fleming
- Technical score engineer – Alex Lamy, Stephanie McNally
- Additional score engineer – Edd Hartwell
- Recording – Geoff Foster
- Additional recording – Alan Meyerson
- Mixing – Stephen Lipson
- Mastering – Nick Watson
- Music editor – Catherine Wilson
- Music consultant – Nick Glennie-Smith

Orchestra

- Orchestration – Bill Connor
- Additional orchestration – Adam Langston, Andrew Kinney, Philip Klein, Richard Harvey, Stephen Coleman
- Orchestra leader – Thomas Bowes
- Conductor – Nick Glennie-Smith
- Contractor – Isobel Griffiths
- Additional contractor – Susie Gillis
- Copyist – Ann Miller, Jill Streater

Soloists

- Accordion – Graham Preskett
- Piano – John Lenehan
- Recorder, strings – Richard Harvey
- Violin – Ann Marie Simpson
- Vocals – Gabriel Kuti

== Accolades ==
Accolades for The Little Prince (Original Motion Picture Soundtrack)
Year	Award	Category	Recipient(s)	Result	Ref(s)
2016	Hollywood Music in Media Awards	Best Original Score – Animated Film	Hans Zimmer and Richard Harvey	Nominated	
2017	Annie Awards	Outstanding Achievement for Music in an Animated Production	Hans Zimmer, Richard Harvey and Camille	Won	
