= The Dirtiest Thirstiest =

Studio album by Yung Wun
- Released: December 7, 2004
- Recorded: 2000–2004
- Studios: Basement Studios (Cliffside Park, NJ); Doppler Studios (Atlanta, GA); Sony Music Studios (New York, NY); Greenhouse Studios (Atlanta, GA); PatchWerk Recording Studios (Atlanta, GA)
- Genre: Hip hop
- Length: 53:28
- Labels: Full Surface; J
- Producers: Bangladesh; David Banner; Faust; Jay-Mac; Swizz Beatz; The Koul Kats; Tony "V.I.P." Lopez; Vizion

Singles from The Dirtiest Thirstiest
- 1. "Tear It Up" Released: 2004; 2. "Walk It, Talk It" Released: 2004

Professional ratings
Review scores
Source	Rating
Blender	4/5 stars
Entertainment Weekly	B
RapReviews	7/10
The Michigan Daily	1/5 stars

The Dirtiest Thirstiest is the only studio album by American rapper Yung Wun. It was released on December 7, 2004, via Full Surface/J Records. Recording sessions took place at Basement Studios in New Jersey, at Doppler Studios, Greenhouse Studios and PatchWerk Recording Studios in Atlanta, and at Sony Music Studios in New York City. Production was handled by Vizion, David Banner, Jay-Mac, The Koul Kats, Bangladesh, Faust, Swizz Beatz and Tony "V.I.P." Lopez, with Lauren Lake, Eric McCaine and Laferron Miles serving as co-producers. It features guest appearances from David Banner, Cassidy, DMX and Lil' Flip.

In the United States, the album did not reach the Billboard 200, however, it peaked at number 50 on the Top R&B/Hip-Hop Albums, number 24 on the Top Rap Albums and number 11 on the Heatseekers Albums charts. Its lead single, "Tear It Up" became Yung Wun's most successful song, peaking at number 76 on the Billboard Hot 100, number 39 on the Hot R&B/Hip-Hop Songs, number 21 on the Hot Rap Songs and number 26 on the Rhythmic Airplay charts in the US. The second and final single off of the album, "Walk It, Talk It", made it to number 97 on the Hot R&B/Hip-Hop Songs.

== Track listing ==
No.	Title	Writer(s)	Producer(s)	Length
1.	"I Can't Take It No More" (Intro)	James Anderson; James Beard	Jay-Mac; Vizion (co.); Lauren Lake (co.)	1:29
2.	"I Tried to Tell Ya"	Anderson; Shondrae Crawford	Bangladesh	3:23
3.	"Tear It Up" (featuring DMX, Lil' Flip and David Banner)	Anderson; Earl Simmons; Wesley Weston; Lavell Crump; Luis Matos; Weldon Dean Parks; Dallas L. Austin; Hal David; Donald Eddie Fletcher; Bernard J. Freeman; Jasper Tremaine Cameron; Todd Anthony Shaw	Faust	3:25
4.	"Yung Wun Anthem"	Anderson; Kaseem Dean; Jack Marshall; Bob Mosher	Swizz Beatz; Eric McCaine (co.)	4:35
5.	"One More Day in the Hood" (featuring Cassidy)	Anderson; Barry Reese; James Seawood; Sekou Davis; Kenneth Gamble; Leon Huff	The Koul Kats	4:28
6.	"Sad Song"	Anderson; Santana Lambert; Marcus Williams; Torrence Scott; Chrishaun Maurice Sinclair	Vizion	4:18
7.	"Starvin' & Robbin'"	Anderson; Beard; Sinclair; Lauren Lake	Jay-Mac; Vizion; Lauren Lake (co.)	4:42
8.	"Load 'Em Up"	Anderson; Taronda Hamilton; Sinclair	Vizion	4:29
9.	"Cadillac Doors"	Anderson; Tony Lopez Jr.; Leo Graham Jr.; Paul Richmond	Tony "V.I.P." Lopez	4:20
10.	"Walk It, Talk It" (featuring David Banner)	Anderson; Crump	David Banner	4:56
11.	"Let It Bump"	Anderson; Seawood; Davis; Norman Whitfield	The Koul Kats	4:20
12.	"Represent/Georgia Waters"	Anderson; Dean; Scott; Sinclair; Laferron Miles	Swizz Beatz; Vizion; Laferron Miles (co.)	11:33
Total length:				53:28

Sample credits

- Track 3 contains excerpts from "Shout It Out" written by Weldon Dean Parks, Dallas Austin, Hal David, Donald Fletcher, Bernard Freeman, Jasper Cameron and Todd Shaw and performed by the A&T Marching Band from Drumline.
- Track 4 contains replayed elements from "The Munsters Theme" written by Jack Marshall and Bob Mosher.
- Track 5 contains samples from "Ship Ahoy" written by Kenneth Gamble and Leon Huff and performed by The O'Jays.
- Track 9 contains samples from "Just One Moment Away" written by Leo Graham Jr. and Paul Richmond and performed by The Manhattans.
- Track 11 contains a sample of the recording "I Need You" written by Norman Whitfield and performed by The Temptations.

== Personnel ==
- James "Yung Wun" Anderson – vocals
- Bazaar Royale – background vocals (track 1)
- D.O. Deville – background vocals (track 2)
- Trillville – background vocals (track 2)
- Earl "DMX" Simmons – vocals (track 3)
- Wesley "Lil' Flip" Weston – vocals (track 3)
- Lavell "David Banner" Crump – vocals (track 3), background vocals & producer (track 10)
- Kasseem "Swizz Beatz" Dean – background vocals (tracks: 4, 9, 12), producer (tracks: 4, 12), executive producer
- Barry "Cassidy" Reese – vocals (track 5)
- Santana "Skinny King" Lambert – additional vocals (track 6)
- Marcus "Big Marc" Williams – additional vocals (track 6)
- Lauren Lake – background vocals & violin (track 7), co-producer (tracks: 1, 7)
- Carl Phipps – additional vocals (track 7)
- Taronda "Pist Off" Hamilton – additional vocals (track 8)
- Shawty The Pimp – background vocals (track 12)
- James "Jay-Mac" Beard – electric guitar (track 1), producer (tracks: 1, 7)
- Steven Hoffman – acoustic guitar (track 6)
- Torrence Scott – bass (tracks: 6, 12), lead guitar (track 12)
- Laferron Miles – additional keyboards (tracks: 6, 12), co-producer & recording (track 12)
- Larry Phillabaum – organ & additional keyboards (track 7), acoustic guitar (track 9), mixing (tracks: 6, 7, 11), recording (tracks: 9, 11)
- Charles Pettaway – guitar (track 10)
- Michael Hardnanett – bass (track 10)
- Shondrae "Bangladesh" Crawford – producer (track 2)
- Luis "Faust" Matos – producer (track 3)
- James Seawood – producer (tracks: 5, 11)
- Sekou Davis – producer (tracks: 5, 11)
- Chrishaun "Vizion" Sinclair – producer (tracks: 6–8, 12), co-producer (track 1)
- Tony "V.I.P." Lopez Jr. – producer (track 9)
- Eric McCaine – co-producer (track 4)
- Robert Brown – recording (track 1)
- E-Plugg – mixing (track 1)
- Matt Atkinson – recording (tracks: 2, 12)
- Greg Fisher – recording assistant (tracks: 2, 12)
- Rich Keller – mixing (tracks: 2–4, 9, 10, 12), recording (track 4)
- Joe Davis – recording (track 3)
- Steve Conover – recording assistant & mixing assistant (track 4)
- Glen Marchese – recording & mixing (track 5)
- Geoff Rice – recording assistant (track 5), mixing assistant (tracks: 5, 10)
- Tech – recording (tracks: 6–8)
- Carlisle Young – mixing (tracks: 8, 12)
- Kevin Wilson – recording assistant (tracks: 9, 11), mixing assistant (track 11)
- Steve Fisher – recording (track 10)
- Jason Agel – mixing assistant (track 12)
- Chris Athens – mastering
- Alli Truch – art direction, design
- Chris LeBeau – art direction
- Marc Baptiste – photography
- Trevor Jerideau – A&R
- Grady Spivey – A&R
- Karl Washington – legal
- Aisha Williams – stylist
- Andre' Aarons – management

== Charts ==
Chart (2004)	Peak position
US Top R&B/Hip-Hop Albums (Billboard)	50
US Top Rap Albums (Billboard)	24
US Heatseekers Albums (Billboard)	11
