= Got It All =

Got It All may refer to:

- "Got It All" (Eve song)
- "Got It All", a song by Blxst and Dom Kennedy from the EP No Love Lost
- "Got It All", a song by Professor Green from the EP M.O.T.H
- "Got it all", a song by Yeat from the EP Lyfe
