= Deadpool (soundtrack) =

Original score and songs used in the film

Deadpool: Original Motion Picture Soundtrack

Soundtrack album by Junkie XL
- Released: February 12, 2016
- Genres: Film score; hip hop; electronic rock
- Length: 1:08:12
- Labels: Milan Records; Fox Music
- Producer: Tom Holkenborg

Junkie XL chronology
Point Break (2015)	Deadpool: Original Motion Picture Soundtrack (2016)	Batman v Superman: Dawn of Justice (2016)

The soundtrack for the 2016 American superhero film Deadpool, based on the Marvel Comics character of the same name and distributed by 20th Century Fox, consists of an original score composed by Tom Holkenborg and a series of songs featured in the film. An album featuring these, named Deadpool: Original Motion Picture Soundtrack, was released on February 12, 2016. It reached number 30 on the US Billboard 200, and topped the soundtrack list from Billboard.

== Development ==
In October 2015, Holkenborg confirmed that he would compose the score for Deadpool. The composition mainly utilized 80's synthesizers that added to the immersion.

Holkenborg used an ARP 2600 and a Synclavier, for Deadpool's 'riffs' and battles, while an Oberheim is mainly for more emotional scenes. A complete orchestra was mainly used for Colussus and Negasonic Teenage Warhead, to give feeling and honor from previous films.

=== Additional songs ===
The soundtrack also includes "Deadpool Rap" by YouTube personalities TeamHeadKick, featuring updated lyrics that reference the film rather than the video game, "Shoop" by Salt-N-Pepa, "X Gon' Give It to Ya" by DMX, and more.

== Release ==
The soundtrack album was released digitally on February 12, 2016, featuring both Holkenborg's score and the additional songs. Physical copies of the soundtrack became available through Milan Records and Fox Music on March 4, 2016.

== Commercial performance ==
The soundtrack debuted at number 30 on the Billboard 200, selling 18,000 units in the first week.

== Track listing ==
All tracks composed by Holkenborg unless where noted.

Track listing
No.	Title	Writer(s)	Performed by	Length
1.	"Angel of the Morning"	Chip Taylor	Juice Newton	4:12
2.	"Maximum Effort"			2:08
3.	"Small Disruption"			1:12
4.	"Shoop"	Cheryl James; Otwane Roberts; Johnathon Marc Blount; Sandra Denton; Ike Turner	Salt-N-Pepa	4:08
5.	"Twelve Bullets"			2:50
6.	"Man in a Red Suit"			2:20
7.	"Liam Neeson Nightmares"			1:56
8.	"Calendar Girl" (1999 Remastered Version)	Neil Sedaka; Howard Greenfield	Neil Sedaka	2:37
9.	"The Punch Bowl"			5:55
10.	"Back to Life"			2:12
11.	"Every Time I See Her"			0:54
12.	"Deadpool Rap"	Todd Andrew; Mason Storm	TeamHeadKick	3:25
13.	"Easy Angel"			2:31
14.	"Scrap Yard"			1:02
15.	"This Place Looks Sanitary"			6:50
16.	"Watership Down"			4:10
17.	"X Gon' Give It to Ya" (Radio Edit)	Earl Simmons; Shatek King; Kasseem Dean	DMX	3:37
18.	"Going Commando"			3:46
19.	"Let's Try to Kill Each Other"			1:00
20.	"Stupider When You Say It"			2:24
21.	"Four or Five Moments"			0:54
22.	"A Face I Would Sit On"			3:07
23.	"Careless Whisper"	George Michael; Andrew Ridgeley	George Michael	5:02
Total length:				1:08:12

Performed by The Hollywood Studio Symphony. Conducted by Nick Glennie-Smith.

Songs not included in the soundtrack, but featured in the film include the following:

- Mukesh — "Mera Joota Hai Japani" (from film Shree 420)
- The Chordettes – "Mr. Sandman"
- Ray Charles – "Hit the Road Jack"
- Flo Rida featuring Sage the Gemini and Lookas – "G.D.F.R."
- Chicago – "You're the Inspiration"

== Chart performance ==
=== Weekly charts ===
Chart (2016)	Peak position
Australian Albums (ARIA)	18
Austrian Albums (Ö3 Austria)	66
Belgian Albums (Ultratop Flanders)	123
Belgian Albums (Ultratop Wallonia)	198
Canadian Albums (Billboard)	48
Swiss Albums (Schweizer Hitparade)	97
US Billboard 200	30
US Soundtrack Albums (Billboard)	1

=== Year-end charts ===
Chart (2016)	Position
US Soundtrack Albums (Billboard)	12
