= X Gon' Give It to Ya =

Single by DMX

from the album Cradle 2 the Grave
- Released: December 10, 2002
- Recorded: 2002
- Genre: Gangsta rap; hardcore hip-hop
- Length: 3:40
- Label: Ruff Ryders; Def Jam
- Songwriters: Earl Simmons; Shatek King; Kasseem Dean
- Producer: Shatek

DMX singles chronology
"I Miss You" (2001)	"X Gon' Give It to Ya" (2002)	"Where the Hood At?" (2003)

Music video
- "X Gon' Give It to Ya" on YouTube

"X Gon' Give It to Ya" is a song by American rapper DMX, released as the lead single from the soundtrack to the film Cradle 2 the Grave (2003). The song is also a hidden track on DMX's greatest hits album, The Definition of X: The Pick of the Litter (2007) and is a bonus track on European releases of his then-current album Grand Champ (2003) (from whose sessions the song is taken). It was written by DMX and produced by co-soundtrack organizer Shatek. It was his most successful international single. In 2016, the single was included on the album Deadpool: Original Motion Picture Soundtrack, a soundtrack for the film Deadpool (2016).

== Commercial performance ==
The song found success on the charts, peaking at number 60 on the Billboard Hot 100, number 30 on the Hot R&B/Hip-Hop Songs and number 13 on the Hot Rap Songs. "X Gon' Give It to Ya" later saw a resurgence in popularity following its inclusion in the 2016 film Deadpool and in its trailers, along with prominent spots in its marketing campaign. Following the movie's release, the song bested its 2003 performance on the Hot R&B/Hip-Hop Songs chart with a peak position of number 23, rose 403 percent in sales with 26,000 downloads, and rose 104 percent in streams to 2.6 million US clicks. As of May 2017, the single has officially been certified platinum by the Recording Industry Association of America (RIAA).

== Music video ==
The song's music video, directed by Joseph Kahn, was nominated for Soundtrack Video of the Year at the 2003 Music Video Production Association Awards.

== Charts ==
=== Weekly charts ===
Chart (2003)	Peak position
Germany (GfK)	23
Ireland (IRMA)	18
Scotland Singles (OCC)	7
Switzerland (Schweizer Hitparade)	14
UK Hip Hop/R&B (OCC)	2
UK Singles (OCC)	6
US Billboard Hot 100	60
US Hot R&B/Hip-Hop Songs (Billboard)	23
US Hot Rap Songs (Billboard)	13

Chart (2016)	Peak position
Australia (ARIA)	54
Austria (Ö3 Austria Top 40)	62
Canada (Nielsen SoundScan)	46
France (SNEP)	48
Hungary (Single Top 40)	12

Chart (2021)	Peak position
Canada Hot 100 (Billboard)	35
Canada (Nielsen SoundScan)	7
Slovakia Singles Digital (ČNS IFPI)	46
Sweden Heatseeker (Sverigetopplistan)	4
US Billboard Hot 100	46
US Hot R&B/Hip-Hop Songs (Billboard)	21

=== Year-end charts ===
Chart (2003)	Position
Germany (Official German Charts)	77
Switzerland (Schweizer Hitparade)	94
UK Singles (Official Charts Company)	80

== Certifications ==
Region	Certification	Certified units/sales
Denmark (IFPI Danmark)	Gold	45,000^{‡}
Germany (BVMI)	3× Gold	450,000^{‡}
Italy (FIMI)	Gold	25,000^{‡}
New Zealand (RMNZ)	2× Platinum	60,000^{‡}
Spain (Promusicae)	Gold	30,000^{‡}
United Kingdom (BPI)	2× Platinum	1,200,000^{‡}
United States (RIAA)	2× Platinum	2,000,000^{‡}
^{‡} Sales+streaming figures based on certification alone.
