= AR-Ab =

American rapper

AR-AB
- Also known as: King AB, Top Goon of Philly, El Patron, The Goon
- Born: Abdul Ibrahim West; September 26, 1982 (age 44); North Philadelphia, Pennsylvania, U.S.
- Genres: Hip hop, gangsta rap, trap
- Occupation: Rapper
- Years active: 2003–2018
- Member of: Original Block Hustlaz
- Formerly of: Larsiny Family
- Criminal information
- Status: Incarcerated at United States Penitentiary, Big Sandy
- Convictions: Conspiracy to distribute drugs and related drug trafficking crimes
- Penalty: 45 years' incarceration, 10 years supervised release, $5,000 fine

Abdul Ibrahim West (born September 26, 1982), better known by his stage name AR-Ab (also referred to as King AB), is a former American rapper from Philadelphia, Pennsylvania and a convicted drug trafficker. He is a member of OBH (Original Block Hustlaz), a rap group he co-founded with frequent collaborator Dark Lo.

West is best known for being involved in the Drake-Meek Mill feud, and for the extensive legal troubles he has faced across his career. In 2021, West was sentenced to 45 years in prison for drug trafficking. Federal authorities stated that his rap crew and label, OBH, was a gang that partook in drug trafficking, murder, and other crimes across North Philadelphia.

== Early life ==
Abdul West was born on September 26, 1982, in Philadelphia, Pennsylvania. West grew up in North Philadelphia. He states in his music that his childhood was marked by domestic and drug abuse from his father.

== Music career ==
West began his career as a battle rapper and went on to become a member of Cassidy's Larsiny Family, appearing as a featured artist on his mixtapes throughout 2007, namely 07-07-07 (Happy Birthday) and Put Ya L In The Sky. He continued working features for artists during this time until the release of his debut mixtape Welcome to Trap Street on May 1, 2008.

In 2008, West and Cassidy appeared on the Cocaine City street DVD, where the two collaborated on "City of Dreams" alongside a young French Montana. This would be Ab's first music video before concentrating on his solo career. He released his second mixtape I See Dead People on January 8, 2009, and his third mixtape Allegheny AB on May 26, 2010.

In late 2010, West and Dark Lo formed their label and rap collective OBH (Original Block Hustlaz), which also includes his brother Lik Moss among other rappers.

West began making waves following the release of his fourth mixtape Who Harder Than Me, released on February 13, 2011. In 2012, West began working on his fifth mixtape Who Harder Than Me II, which was released on October 5, 2012. The record included features from fellow Philadelphia rapper Freeway, and New York rapper and producer Swizz Beatz who had previously worked with Cassidy during the latter's stint with Ruff Ryders Entertainment. The collaboration, during which Swizz Beatz referred to Ab as "most important new artist in rap", prompted speculation whether he would be signed to his label.

The following year saw the release of his sixth mixtape MUD Musik on February 28, 2013. This would be his last release before his latest round of legal trouble which saw West turning himself into authorities and incarcerated in March of that same year. Complex named him one of "15 Unsigned Rappers Who Should Get a Deal After SXSW" in 2013.

In 2015, West became involved in the Drake-Meek Mill feud after Drake referenced West on his diss track "Back to Back", where he raps, "I drove here in the Wraith playin' AR-Ab". West later appeared on VladTV in August 2015 saying that while he hasn't signed on to Drake's OVO Sound and sided with him saying he was disappointed in Mill's response. Mill responded on August 6 during a performance in Camden, New Jersey where he said "Fuck AR-Ab" and questioned his allegiance to an out-of-town rapper. West responded by releasing his own version of "Back to Back" freestyle on August 8 which dissed Mill and also contained violent lyrics where he threatened to unleash his "shooters" upon Mill. In response, Meek's cousin Omelly released his own version of "Back to Back" freestyle which dissed AR-Ab and also contained violent lyrics. West stated he wouldn't respond to Omelly's diss because he's a "worker". In January 2016, West revealed that he and Meek Mill had reconciled.

In 2024, West released the extended play Road to Glory, presumably containing music recorded before his 2018 incarceration.

== Personal life ==
In 2012, West's grandmother died and his mother died the following month. He describes this as a traumatic moment in his life, having already lost an elder brother prior. West is a practicing Muslim.

== Legal issues ==
West has been embroiled in a spate of legal issues throughout his career, and prior to his involvement in the music industry, including charges related to drug trafficking, possession, and violent crimes. According to interviews, he has served time in jail on four separate occasions prior to his most-recent 2013 sentencing related to crack cocaine.

=== 2005 homicide case ===
In 2005, West was one of three men wanted by police in connection to an April 15 shooting that left one man dead and two others injured. Prominent rapper Cassidy was the main suspect, with Ab and a third unidentified man being wanted as accomplices. In a December 3, 2008, interview with PhillyHeatTV, AR-Ab revealed he was found "not guilty", having spent two years fighting the case. Cassidy had surrendered to Philadelphia police on the afternoon of June 17, 2005. The case took a turn when the primary witness withdrew his confession. On January 25, 2006, Cassidy was convicted of involuntary manslaughter, two counts of aggravated assault and possession of an instrument of crime for his involvement in the shooting. He was sentenced to 11 to 23 months in prison plus probation, and was credited with the 7 months he had already served. He was released after serving 8 months in prison, and went on to relaunch the Larsiny Family which included then-member AR-Ab.

=== 2011 shootings ===
During an incident late-September 2011, West survived being shot ten times. A tweet dated September 24, 2011, showed a bandaged West lying in bed recuperating with the caption "10 shots couldn't stop me!!!" A previous Tweet confirmed he was in the hospital receiving treatment. He is reported to have suffered two shots to the stomach, two to the hand, five to the glutes and one shot to the thigh.

=== 2013 prison sentence ===
On April 13, 2013, media outlets reported on a tweet from rapper AR-Ab referring to a past crime which caught up to him. "3 years ago I got caught up in a big drug trafficking raid, it just caught up to me. Now I gottta pay da price. I'm doing my final show tonite", claimed the tweet. Speculations were abound whether he would be going to jail soon. On April 26, videographer Gil Videos uploaded a video with Ab revealing he will be turning himself in to the authorities. Following his prison sentence, music videos from AR-Ab and OBH members prominently featured the "Free AR-Ab" slogan, and urged fans to write to Abdul West while he's in prison. He was released on parole in November 2014, having served 18 months. According to interviews, Ab was booked for charges related to crack cocaine and faced up to 3 years, which was hastened to 18 months through his participation in the boot camp program.

=== 2018 drug trafficking and conspiracy ===
In October 2018, West, alongside eight others said to be members of a drug trafficking organization, were arrested and indicted on charges of distributing drugs in North Philadelphia. His charges include a conspiracy to distribute, the possession, and the distribution of cocaine, crack, methamphetamine, and heroin. The indictment identified West as the leader of the gang, and that the gang obtained high-end properties in Philadelphia to protect their supply. Lyrics and social media posts made by West and his affiliates were used by authorities in their case against him and his gang, which authorities identified as his rap crew and label, the Original Block Hustlaz. Authorities stated that OBH was a drug dealing gang led by West.

On November 19, 2019, West was found guilty of several counts of conspiracy and distribution of crack cocaine, heroin, and methamphetamine in his federal conspiracy case. While awaiting sentencing, he was allegedly attacked and stabbed in prison in 2020.

On April 15, 2021, West was sentenced to 45 years in prison, with ten years of supervised release and a $5,000 fine. His final OBH co-defendant was sentenced in October of that year.

== Discography ==
Mixtapes

- Welcome to Trapstreet (2008)
- I See Dead People (2009)
- Allegheny AB (2010)
- Who Harder Than Me (2011)
- Who Harder Than Me II (2012)
- Mud Musik (2013)
- Mud Musik II (2015)
- Who Harder Than Me III (2016)
- Protocol Vol 1 (2017)
- Protocol Vol 2 (2017)
- Protocol Vol 3 (2017)
- Protocol Vol 4 (2018)
- Road to Glory (2024)

== Filmography ==
- Next Day Air (2009)
