= Ryde or Die Vol. 2 =

Compilation album by Ruff Ryders
- Released: July 4, 2000
- Recorded: 1999-2000
- Studios: Chung King Studios (New York City, New York); Sony Music Studios (New York City, New York); The Record Plant (Los Angeles, California); The Hit Factory Criteria Miami (Miami, Florida); Battery Studios (New York City, New York); Westlake Audio (Los Angeles, California); Enterprise (Los Angeles, California); Powerhouse Studios (Yonkers, New York)
- Genre: Hardcore hip hop
- Length: 59:31
- Labels: Interscope; Ruff Ryders
- Producers: Darrin Dean (exec.); Joaquin "Waah" Dean (exec.); Chivon Dean (exec.); Leota Blacknor (exec.); Swizz Beatz; Mahogany; Teflon; Icepick; P. Killer Trackz; TJ Beatz

Ruff Ryders chronology
Ryde or Die Vol. 1 (1999)	Ryde or Die Vol. 2 (2000)	Ryde or Die Vol. 3: In the "R" We Trust (2001)

Singles from Ryde Or Die Vol. 1
- 1. "WW III" Released: 2000; 2. "Got It All" Released: 2000

Professional ratings
Review scores
Source	Rating
AllMusic	3/5 stars
RapReviews	5.5/10
USA Today	3/4 stars

Ryde or Die Vol. 2 is the second compilation album by American hip hop collective and record label Ruff Ryders. It was originally scheduled for release on March 7, 2000 under the name Swizz Compilation Vol.2, but was delayed to July 4, 2000 and released via Interscope Records and Ruff Ryders. Recording sessions took place at Chung King Studios, Sony Music Studios, Battery Studios, Powerhouse Studios in New York City, at the Record Plant, the Enterprise, Westlake Audio in Los Angeles, at the Hit Factory Criteria in Miami. Production was handled by Swizz Beatz, Mahogany, Teflon, Icepick, P. Killer Trackz and TJ Beatz, with Darrin Dean, Joaquin Dean, Chivon Dean and Leota Blacknor serving as executive producers. It features guest appearances from Busta Rhymes, Method Man & Redman, Scarface, Snoop Dogg, Trick Daddy, Twista, and Yung Wun.

The album debuted at number two on Billboard 200, selling 254,000 copies in its first week in stores and was certified Platinum by the Recording Industry Association of America on August 18, 2000.

== Track listing ==
#	Title	Songwriters	Producer(s)	Performer (s)	Length
1	"WW III"	Calvin Broadus; James Anderson; Brad Jordan; Jason Phillips; Kasseem Dean	Swizz Beatz	Intro & outro: Cross; Interlude 1: Swizz Beatz & Snoop Dogg; Verse 1: Snoop Dogg; Interlude 2: Swizz Beatz & Yung Wun; Verse 2: Yung Wun; Interlude 3: Swizz Beatz & Scarface; Verse 3: Scarface; Interlude 4: Swizz Beatz & Jadakiss; Verse 4: Jadakiss	5:15
2	"2 Tears In A Bucket"	Sean Jacobs; Clifford Smith; Reggie Noble; K. Dean; Jay Jackson	Swizz Beatz	Intro: Sheek Louch backing vocals by Method Man; Chorus: Sheek Louch, Redman & Method Man; Verse 1: Sheek Louch; Verse 2: Redman; Verse 3: Method Man	4:10
3	"Got It All"	Eve Jeffers; Phillips; Sheldon Harris; Barry Reese; Sean Lassiter	Teflon	Chorus: Eve; Verse 1: Eve; Verse 2: Jadakiss; Verse 3: Eve; Verse 4: Jadakiss; Outro: Jadakiss & Eve	3:47
4	"Ryde Or Die Boyz"	Anderson; Lassiter; R. Jean-Jacques; Reese; Imsomie Leeper; Eddie Hazel; George Clinton, Jr.	Mahogany	Chorus: Yung Wun; Verse 1: Shiz Lansky; Verse 2: Akbar; Verse 3: Cassidy	3:22
5	"It's a Holiday (Skit)"		Jay "Icepick" Jackson; Grimmy (co.); Styles P (co.)		1:48
6	"Holiday"	David Styles; K. Dean	Swizz Beatz	Intro & all verses: Styles P; Chorus: Jadakiss & Styles P	3:50
7	"Weed, Hoes, Dough"	Melvin Smalls; Harris	Teflon	Drag-On	4:00
8	"Fuck Da Haters (Skit)"		Jay "Icepick" Jackson; Swizz Beatz (co.)		1:28
9	"Fright Night"	Trevor Smith; K. Dean; Reese; Lassiter	Swizz Beatz	Intro & chorus: Busta Rhymes; Verse 1: Swizz Beatz; Verse 2: Busta Rhymes; Verse 3: Swizz Beatz; Outro: Swizz Beatz	4:56
10	"My Name Is Kiss"	Phillips; Anthony Fields; Darrin Dean	P.K.	Intro & all verses: Jadakiss; Chorus: Styles P & Jadakiss	4:07
11	"Twisted Heat"	Carl Mitchell; Smalls; K. Dean	Swizz Beatz	Intro: Swizz Beatz; Chorus: Twista; Verse 1: Twista; Verse 2: Drag-On; Interlude: Swizz Beatz; Verse 3: Twista; Verse 4: Drag-On	4:22
12	"Go Head"	Phillips; Jacobs; Styles	TJ Beatz	Intro: Styles P; Chorus: Styles P & Sheek Louch; Verse 1: Jadakiss; Verse 2: Sheek Louch; Verse 3: Styles P	4:26
13	"I'm a H-O-E (Skit)"		Jay "Icepick" Jackson; Grimmy (co.)		1:20
14	"Stomp"	Anderson; Maurice Young; K. Dean	TJ Beatz	Intro: Yung Wun; Chorus: Yung Wun backing vocals by Swizz Beatz; Verse 1: Yung Wun; Verse 2: Trick Daddy; Verse 3: Yung Wun	4:13
15	"The Great"	Earl Simmons; Leeper	Mahogany	DMX	4:07
16	"It's Going Down" (Bonus Track)	Derek Jones; Juano Creary; Ted Cheek; Oliver Scott; Ronnie Wilson	Juano Creary; Ted Cheek	Parlé	4:22

== Samples ==
- Track 4 embodies an interpolation from "I'm Holding You Responsible" written by George Clinton and Eddie Hazel
- Track 16 embodies an interpolation from "Yearning for Your Love" written by Oliver Scott and Ronnie Wilson

== Charts ==
=== Weekly charts ===
Chart (2000)	Peak position
German Albums (Offizielle Top 100)	56
US Billboard 200	2
US Top R&B/Hip-Hop Albums (Billboard)	1

=== Year-end charts ===
Chart (2000)	Position
US Billboard 200	78
US Top R&B/Hip-Hop Albums (Billboard)	27

== Certifications ==
Region	Certification	Certified units/sales
United States (RIAA)	Platinum	1,000,000^{^}
^{^} Shipments figures based on certification alone.
