= Where the Hood At? =

Single by DMX

from the album Grand Champ
- Released: August 5, 2003
- Genre: Hip hop; gangsta rap
- Length: 4:46
- Label: Ruff Ryders; Def Jam
- Songwriter: E. Simmons
- Producer: Tuneheadz

DMX singles chronology
"X Gon' Give It to Ya" (2003)	"Where the Hood At?" (2003)	"Get It on the Floor" (2003)

"Where the Hood At?" is a song by American rapper DMX, released as the lead single from his 2003 studio album Grand Champ. AllMusic stated "The anthemic lead single, 'Where the Hood At,' is precisely modeled after previous DMX rallying calls like 'Ruff Ryders' Anthem', 'What's My Name?', and 'Who We Be.'" The music video is set in DMX's hometown neighborhood in Yonkers, New York.

"Where the Hood At?" peaked at #68 on the Billboard Hot 100, and would become the last DMX song to chart on it with DMX as the lead artist, before his death in April 2021.

== Release ==
=== Production ===
The song was recorded in a studio in Chicago. DMX's close friend Rudy "Kato" Rangel was also there while DMX was recording it. When DMX first heard the beat, he immediately came up with the lyrics for what would later be the first line of the chorus for the song, which also became the title of the song. The song's first verse criticizes homosexuals, with lyrics including "Last I heard ya niggas was havin' sex/With the same sex/I show no love/To homo thugs". Ironically, DMX says "You hold my dick while he's sucking it" later in the song's third verse.

The clean version does not have the third verse, unlike the explicit version. The producers for the song were the production group Tuneheadz. Recorded in 2003, it was one of the first singles to be available as a digital download via Amazon.com.

The song samples "I'll Play the Blues for You" by Albert King. That song was originally sampled by Big Daddy Kane for the song "Young, Gifted and Black". DMX stated that he was "in love with that beat when Kane did it".

=== Music video ===
The music video is set in DMX's neighborhood in Yonkers, New York. There are appearances from rappers Drag-On, Swizz Beatz (who performs the intro for the clean and music video version of the song), Fat Joe and Busta Rhymes, as well as deceased Ruff Ryders affiliate William 'Tiny' Jacobs. In the second half of the video, a song entitled "A'Yo Kato", produced by Swizz Beatz, was added to pay tribute to his fallen friend Rudy "Kato" Rangel. Rangel's widow Valerie, who appears on the outro of the song, appears at the end of the video.

== Critical reception ==
Rolling Stone described the song as "an exhilarating dose of fight music." In a review for PopMatters, critic Matt Cibula took issue with the song's homophobic first verse, inquiring "What year is it that we have to hear shit like this? 1987 on an Ice-T record? 1939 in Germany? The Middle fucking Ages?"

== Track listing ==
=== US version ===
1. "Where the Hood At?"
2. "Where the Hood At?" (Instrumental)
3. "Ruff Ryders' Anthem"

=== UK version ===
1. "Where the Hood At?"
2. "Ruff Ryders' Anthem"
3. "Who We Be"
4. "Where the Hood At?" (Video CD-ROM)

== Charts ==
Chart (2003–2005)	Position
U.S. Billboard Hot 100	68
U.S. Hot R&B/Hip-Hop Singles & Tracks (Billboard)	1
U.S. Hot Rap Singles (Billboard)	1
UK Singles (Official Charts Company)	16
UK R&B (Official Charts Company)	1
German Singles (Media Control Charts)	29
New Zealand (Recorded Music NZ)	13

== Certifications ==
Region	Certification	Certified units/sales
United Kingdom (BPI)	Gold	400,000^{‡}
United States (RIAA)	Platinum	1,000,000^{‡}
^{‡} Sales+streaming figures based on certification alone.
