= Ruby Andrews =

American soul singer (1947–2026)

- Andrews, c. 1971.

Background information
- Born: Ruby Mae Stackhouse; March 12, 1947; Hollandale, Mississippi, U.S.
- Origin: Chicago, Illinois, U.S.
- Died: August 13, 2026 (aged 79) Chicago, Illinois, U.S.
- Education: Hyde Park Academy High School
- Genres: R&B; Soul; Deep Soul; Soul Blues
- Occupation: Singer
- Instrument: Vocals
- Years active: 1965–2019
- Labels: Kelmac; Zodiac; MCA; ABC
- Spouse: Robert "Squirrel" Lester (d. 2010)
- Website: https://myspace.com/rubyandrews

Ruby Mae Stackhouse (March 12, 1947 – August 13, 2026), known professionally as Ruby Andrews, was an American R&B/soul singer from Chicago, Illinois. Beginning her professional career in the mid–1960s, Andrews was best known for her songs: "Casanova (Your Playing Days Are Over)" (1967), "You Made a Believer (Out of Me)" (1969) and "Everybody Saw You" (1970).

== Life and career ==
=== Early life and education ===
Ruby Mae Stackhouse was born one of three children in Hollandale, Mississippi on March 12, 1947 to Florence Daniel. Around 1953, Andrews' family relocated to Chicago. Andrews attended Hyde Park Academy High School, graduating in 1966. Around her senior year in high school, Andrews started singing with a vocal group called The Vondells.

=== Career ===
Andrews made her debut on the Kelmac label, recording with the Vondells although the record was released as "by Ruby Stackhouse". Andrews third release for the label was her biggest seller, "Casonova [sic] (Your Playing Days Are Over)" in 1967. A crossover hit, the song went to number 9 in the R&B charts and number 51 in the pop charts. The song, co-written and produced by Joshie Jo Armstead, featured a typical Chicago-style mid-tempo arrangement, but was recorded and arranged by Mike Terry in Detroit. Some later reissues of the track used the (historically correct) spelling "Casanova". Follow-ups included "You Can Run (But You Can't Hide)", "You Made a Believer (Out of Me)" (no. 18 on the R&B chart and no. 96 on the pop chart in 1969), "Everybody Saw You" (no. 34 R&B in 1970) and "You Ole Boo You". Andrews' releases on Zodiac were produced and written by the team of Fred Bridges, Robert Eaton and Richard Knight, who also performed as the vocal group Brothers of Soul. Andrews later cut some bluesy material for Ichiban, with producer Swamp Dogg.

=== Later years, personal life and death ===
Andrews later founded and served as the CEO of Genuine Ruby Records LLC. Andrews was married at least once and had no children. Andrews was married to Robert "Squirrel" Lester, a member of the Chicago-based singing group The Chi-Lites until his death in January 2010. Andrews died at her home in Chicago, on August 13, 2026, at the age of 79.

== Partial discography ==
=== Chart singles ===
Year	A-side	Chart positions	
Year	A-side	US Pop	US R&B
1967	"Casonova (Your Playing Days Are Over)"	51	9
1968	"Hey Boy Take A Chance On Love"	92	-
1968	"The Love I Need"	-	48
1969	"You Made A Believer (Out Of Me)"	96	18
1970	"Everybody Saw You" / "Can You Get Away"	118 -	34; 41
1971	"You Ole Boo Boo You"	-	47

=== Albums ===
- Everybody Saw You (1970)
- Black Ruby (1972)
- Genuine Ruby (1977)
- Kiss This (1991)
- Ruby (1993)
- Hip Shakin Mama (1998)

==== Compilations ====
- Casanova (Your Playing Days Are Over) (1994)
- Hip Shakin Mama (1998)
- Casanova - Your Playing Days Are Over (Her Greatest Hits) (2000)
- Just Loving You (The Zodiac Sessions 1967 - 1973) (2004)
- Swamp Dogg Presents: The Boss Ladies of Soul (2007)
- Hits Anthology (2013)
