= WW III (song) =

Song by Ruff Ryders featuring Snoop Dogg, Scarface, Jadakiss and Yung Wun

Promotional single by Ruff Ryders featuring Snoop Dogg, Scarface, Jadakiss and Yung Wun

from the album Ryde or Die Vol. 2
- Released: 2000
- Length: 5:15
- Label: Ruff Ryders; Interscope
- Songwriters: Calvin Broadus; Brad Jordan; Jason Phillips; James Anderson; Kasseem Dean
- Producer: Swizz Beatz

Music video
- "WW III" on YouTube

"WW III" (pronounced "world war three") is a song by American hip-hop collective and record label Ruff Ryders and promotional single from their second compilation album Ryde or Die Vol. 2 (2000). It features American rappers Snoop Dogg, Scarface, Jadakiss and Yung Wun. The song was produced by Swizz Beatz.

== Background ==
In an interview with Complex, Swizz Beatz said about the song:

I definitely envisioned that whole song 100%. My uncles had input in it because they were hands on with everything, but at that point we were on autopilot. Everybody knew I knew what I was doing. I was comfortable in my craft because we were making hits. I knew this was going to be big. We were making a statement by having Scarface and Snoop. Me and Snoop had been kicking it so that phone call went through and the Scarface call went through [and we got them]. Then you've got Jadakiss on there and a new artist named Yung Wun that I had from Atlanta. That covered a lot.

While hanging out in the studio, Swizz came up with an intro along the lines of "State your name, gangsta. Where you from?" The intro was used in the song as an alternative for a chorus after each verse. A chorus was added to the end of the song and sung by Ruff Ryders artist Cross.

== Critical reception ==
In a review of Ryde or Die Vol. 2, Steve "Flash" Juon of RapReviews commented that the technique of including guest rappers on tracks to overcome inconsistency is "especially effective" on "WW III", which he described as "a Swizz Beatz uber-coastal wet dream with Snoop Dogg, Yung Wun, Scarface and the aforementioned 'Kiss on a track specially guaranteed to rattle your boxes. For the testosterone impaired; play with caution – it WILL put hair on your chest." Jason Birchmeier of AllMusic mentioned the song as one of the album's "moments when Beatz's music almost goes too far with its excessive synth use", but also regarded Snoop Dogg's performance on the song as "stunning rapping".

== Charts ==
Chart (2000)	Peak position
US Hot R&B/Hip-Hop Songs (Billboard)	77
