= I'm a Hustla (song) =

Single by Cassidy

from the album I'm a Hustla
- Released: February 28, 2005
- Genre: East Coast hip-hop
- Length: 4:19
- Label: Full Surface, J
- Songwriters: Barry A. Reese, Shawn C. Carter, Timothy Mosley
- Producer: Swizz Beatz

Cassidy singles chronology
"Get No Better" (2004)	"I'm a Hustla" (2005)	"B-Boy Stance" (2005)

"I'm a Hustla" is a song by American rapper Cassidy released in the United States on February 28, 2005, as the lead single from his second studio album of the same name (2005). The song, which was produced by American musician Swizz Beatz, contains a vocal sample from "Dirt off Your Shoulder" as performed by American rapper Jay-Z. The song reached number 34 on the US Billboard Hot 100 chart.

Several remixes have been produced, featuring various alternate guests including Joe Budden and Jay-Z, however the official remix features Mary J. Blige. Rapper Missy Elliott also made a freestyle version with DJ Khaled. In 2018, Beyoncé sampled "I'm a Hustla" for her Beychella performance.

== Music video ==
The music video was directed by Benny Boom and features a cameo appearance by Swizz Beatz, Mashonda, and Growing Up Gotti stars Carmine Agnello and John Agnello. In the music video Cassidy dances the hustla dance later popularized as the motorcycle in Yung Joc's video for "It's Goin' Down", the following year.

== Charts ==
=== Weekly charts ===
Chart (2005)	Peak position
Germany (GfK)	38
Netherlands (Urban Top 100)	98
US Billboard Hot 100	34
US Hot R&B/Hip-Hop Songs (Billboard)	8
US Hot Rap Songs (Billboard)	5
US Pop 100 (Billboard)	69

=== Year-end charts ===
Chart (2005)	Position
US Hot R&B/Hip-Hop Songs (Billboard)	32

== Release history ==
Region	Date	Format(s)	Label	Ref.
United States	February 28, 2005	Rhythmic contemporary radio	J, RMG	
United States	February 28, 2005	Urban contemporary radio	J, RMG	
