= Cradle 2 the Grave (soundtrack) =

Soundtrack album by various artists
- Released: February 18, 2003
- Recorded: 2002
- Studio: Various: Quad Recording Studios (Times Square, NY); Unique Recording Studios (Times Square, NY); Teamwork Music Studios (New York, NY); The Room Lab (Hackensack, NJ); The Studio (Philadelphia, PA); Chung King Studios (New York, NY); Soundcastle (California); Right Track Recording (Manhattan, NY); Sony Music Studios (New York, NY); Enterprise (Burbank, CA); Sound On Sound (New York, NY); The Hit Factory (New York, NY); Soul Clap Studios (New York, NY); Larrabee West (West Hollywood, CA); Battery Studios (Chicago, IL); Gold Mine Studios (Queens, NY)
- Genre: East Coast hip hop; hardcore hip hop; gangsta rap
- Label: Bloodline; Ruff Ryders; Def Jam; Warner Bros.
- Producer: Jazz Young (exec.); DMX (exec.); Shatek King; Antwan "Amadeus" Thompson; Dame Grease; DJ Envy; Elite; Eminem; Flip Matrix; Gavin Marchand; Jay Funk; Kato; Konkrete Kaos; Lost Spirit; Mac G; Mannie Fresh; Mono; Paperchase Inc; Reemo; The Arkitects; Tony Pizarro; White Boy; Leroy Austin; Sha Money XL

Singles from Cradle 2 the Grave
- 1. "X Gon' Give It to Ya" Released: December 10, 2002

Cradle 2 the Grave is the soundtrack to Andrzej Bartkowiak's 2003 action film Cradle 2 the Grave. It was released on February 18, 2003 through Bloodline Records and Def Jam Recordings. Recording sessions took place at Quad Recording Studios, at Teamwork Music Studios, at Chung King Studios, at Right Track Recording, at Sony Music Studios, at Sound On Sound, at The Hit Factory, at Soul Clap Studios, and at Gold Mine Studios in New York, at the Room Lab in Hackensack, at the Studio in Philadelphia, at Soundcastle in California, at Enterprise Studios in Burbank, at Larrabee West in West Hollywood, and at Battery Studios in Chicago.

Production was handled by several record producers, including Shatek King, DJ Envy, Dame Grease, Elite, Eminem, Mannie Fresh, Tony Pizarro and Sha Money XL. It features contributions from film star DMX, alongside Birdman, C-N-N, Drag-On, Fat Joe, Foxy Brown, G-Unit, Joe Budden, M.O.P., Obie Trice and the Clipse among others.

The soundtrack was very successful, peaking at number 6 on the Billboard 200, number 3 on the Top R&B/Hip-Hop Albums and number 1 on the Top Soundtracks, also the soundtrack included DMX's single, "X Gon' Give It to Ya". The soundtrack was also certified gold by the Recording Industry Association of America on May 19, 2003, with over 500,000 copies sold.

The song "Go to Sleep" has been used as the entrance song to UFC fighters Sam Stout and Dan Cramer.

== Critical reception ==
Professional ratings
Review scores
Source	Rating
AllMusic	2.5/5 stars
RapReviews	7/10

AllMusic writer John Bush found the opening track up there with the rest of DMX's work but said it "doesn't sound too special". He added that he was surprised by the contributions from Foxy Brown and Drag-On, saying that "My Life (Cradle 2 the Grave)" had Brown being "curiously reflective (and more than just a bit poignant)" and the samples of The Temptations and Marvin Gaye used on "Fireman" make it "sound[s] completely original". Steve Juon of RapReviews said, "Taken as a whole Cradle 2 the Grave is about par for most compilations, soundtrack or otherwise, released in the last twelve months. With a few nice surprises [...] this soundtrack is slightly better than most. It's not an overwhelming success, but it's good enough to ensure that DMX fans won't be calling for his head if the movie tanks".

== Track listing ==
No.	Title	Writer(s)	Producer(s)	Length
1.	"X Gon' Give It to Ya" (DMX)	E. Simmons; S. King	Shatek King	3:39
2.	"Go to Sleep" (Eminem with DMX and Obie Trice)	E. Simmons; M. Mathers; O. Trice; S. King; L. Resto	Eminem	4:42
3.	"What's It All for?" (Bazaar Royale)	B. Royale; S. King; C. Sandford; C. Ginsberg; D. Miller; J. Margera	Shatek King	3:50
4.	"Follow Me Gangster" (G-Unit)	C. Jackson; C. Lloyd; M. Bernard; K. Frazier; S. Dorsian; M. Clervoix; V. Montana Jr.	Reemo; Lost Spirit; Sha Money XL (add.)	3:31
5.	"Stompdashitoutu" (Capone-N-Noreaga featuring M.O.P.)	K. Holley; V. Santiago; E. Murray; J. Griannage; T. Pizarro; F. Wilcox; E. Randle; J. Shaw	Tony Pizarro; Flip Matrix	3:03
6.	"Do Sumptin" (Comp)	J. McElveen; J. Carter; L. Austin	Jay Funk; Leroy Austin (co.)	4:08
7.	"My Life (Cradle 2 the Grave)" (Foxy Brown featuring Althea)	I. Marchand; A. Thompson; G. Marchand; B. Jackson; E. Townsend	Antwan "Amadeus" Thompson; Gavin Marchand	4:15
8.	"Fireman" (Drag-On)	M. Smalls; A. Parrino; B. Strong; C. Mayfield; N. Whitfield	Elite	2:56
9.	"Drop Drop" (Joe Budden)	J. Budden; J. Kuleszynski	Joseph "White Boy" Kuleszynski	4:17
10.	"I'm Serious" (Clipse)	G. Thornton; T. Thornton; L. Porter	Paperchase Inc.	4:12
11.	"Right/Wrong" (DMX)	E. Simmons; R. Casey; R. Thybulle	DJ Envy; Mono	3:46
12.	"It's Gon' Be What It's Gon' Be" (Jinx & Loose)	A. Lewis; D. Pelzer; S. Odom; B. Holland; E. Holland; K. Clarke	Konkrete Kaos	3:01
13.	"Hand That Rocks the Cradle" (Big Stan)	D. Joyner; D. Blackman	Dame Grease	4:13
14.	"Won't Be Coming Back" (Birdman)	B. Williams; B. Thomas; L. Richie	Mannie Fresh	4:10
15.	"C2G" (Fat Joe featuring Young N Restless)	J. Cartagena; R. Montero; R. Santanna; S. King	Shatek King	4:13
16.	"Focus" (Kashmir)	E. Lomax; J. Russ	Mac G	3:56
17.	"Slangin' Dem Thangs" (Profit)	L. Duminie; R. Rangel; F. Massey; L. Creed; T. Bell	Kato	4:40
18.	"Off the Hook" (Jinx da Juvy)	D. Carr; M. Leather; S. Campbell	The Arkitects	4:09

Bonus track
No.	Title	Writer(s)	Producer(s)	Length
19.	"Getting Down" (DMX, Big Stan, Kashmir and Bazaar Royale)	E. Simmons; D. Joyner; E. Lomax; C. Sandford; R. Casey; R. Thybulle	DJ Envy; Mono	2:56

== Charts ==
=== Weekly charts ===
Chart (2003)	Peak position
Canadian Albums (Billboard)	11
French Albums (SNEP)	61
German Albums (Offizielle Top 100)	39
Swiss Albums (Schweizer Hitparade)	75
US Billboard 200	6
US Top R&B/Hip-Hop Albums (Billboard)	3
US Soundtrack Albums (Billboard)	1

=== Year-end charts ===
Chart (2003)	Position
US Billboard 200	148
US Top R&B/Hip-Hop Albums (Billboard)	56

== Certifications ==
Region	Certification	Certified units/sales
Canada (Music Canada)	Gold	50,000^{^}
United States (RIAA)	Gold	500,000^{^}
^{^} Shipments figures based on certification alone.
