= Boxy =

Boxy is an adjective meaning "like a box".

Boxy may also refer to:

- Boxy, a character in the novel Boxy an Star
- Boxy, a character in Futurama
- Boxy Brown, a character in Aqua Teen Hunger Force

== See also ==
- Boxxy (born 1992), YouTube personality
- Boxee, an HTPC (Home Theater PC) software
- Boxey, Newfoundland and Labrador, a settlement in Canada
- Boxey (character), a child character in the 1978–79 television series Battlestar Galactica
