= Larsiny Family =

American hip hop group

Larsiny
- Origin: North Philadelphia, Pennsylvania, U.S.
- Genres: Hip hop
- Years active: 2000–present
- Label: TD Entertainment
- Members: Shiz Lansky; Akbar; Cassidy
- Past members: AR-Ab

Larsiny is an American hip hop group from North Philadelphia, Pennsylvania. Rapper Cassidy formed the group in the late 1990s with hometown natives Akbar (Rodney Jean-Jacques) and Shiz Lansky (Sean Lassiter). They first signed with the Ruff Ryders subsidiary label TD Entertainment in 2000, and were subsequently featured on the song "Ryde Or Die Boyz" from the Ruff Ryders Ryde or Die Vol. 2 (2000) compilation album. AR-Ab later joined the group in 2003, while Shiz Lansky was featured on the song "I Pray" from Cassidy's B.A.R.S. The Barry Adrian Reese Story (2007) album.

== History ==
=== 2000–2007: Full Surface ===
Larsiny (then consisting of Shiz Lansky, Akbar, and Cassidy) was discovered in Philadelphia, Pennsylvania by Terrence Dean, the father of producer Swizz Beatz and the brother of the founders of Ruff Ryders. The group subsequently signed to TD Entertainment, Terrence Dean's company that served as a subsidiary label of Ruff Ryders. Their commercial debut appearance was on the song "Ryde Or Die Boyz" from Ryde or Die Vol.2 in 2000. Members Shiz Lansky and Cassidy help co-write Eve's single "Got It All" from the album as well.

In 2003, AR-Ab was added to the group due to his affiliation with Cassidy.

The group has released two mixtapes: Put Ya L's In The Sky; released on January 4, 2008; and the second, 100 Bars Mixtape (a.k.a. North Philly of Death) released on April 19, 2009.

=== 2008–2009: Quarrels ===
In 2008, there was a beef brewing between Cassidy and Akbar that came to public attention. By February 2009, various clips of Akbar dissing Cassidy appeared on YouTube, resulting in a response track on Cassidy's Apply Pressure (2009) mixtape called "Dear Rodney (Akbar Diss)" and also Akbar's departure from Larsiny.

=== 2009–present: Kross Over Entertainment ===
Cassidy took his Larsiny Family label over to Kross Over Entertainment and E1 Music with him, and released his fourth studio album C.A.S.H. (2010.

== Discography ==
=== Mixtapes ===
- 2008: Put Ya L's in the Sky (hosted by DJ Thoro)
- 2009: 100 Bars (North Philly of Death)
