= The Precisions =

Musical group

- Origin: Detroit, Michigan, United States
- Genres: Doo Wop
- Years active: 1960s
- Past members: Arthur Ashford; Michael Morgan; Billy Prince; Denis Gilmore

The Precisions was an American, Detroit-based, doo-wop/R&B vocal group of the 1960s. Their breakthrough single "If This Is Love (I'd Rather Be Lonely)," reached No. 26 in the R&B and No. 60 in the Billboard pop chart. This was followed up with "Instant Heartbreak" in March 1968. The band's members were Arthur Ashford, Michael Morgan, Billy Prince and Denis Gilmore.

"If This Is Love (I'd Rather Be Lonely)" is still played regularly on the Northern soul circuit.

== Discography ==
=== Singles ===
Year	A-Side	B-Side	US Pop	US R&B
1965	"My Lover Come Back"	"I Wanna Tell My Baby"	-	-
1965	"Mexican Love Song"	"You're Sweet"	-	-
1967	"Such Misery"	"A Lovers Plea"	-	-
1967	"Sugar Ain't Sweet"	"What I Want"	-	-
1967	"Why Girl"	"What I Want"	-	28
1967	"If This Is Love (I'd Rather Be Lonely)"	"You'll Soon Be Gone"	60	26
1968	"Instant Heartbreak (Just Add Tears)"	"Dream Girl"	-	-
1968	"A Place"	"Never Let Her Go"	-	50
1969	"Into My Life"	"Don't Double With Trouble"	-	-
1969	"New York City"	"You're The Best (That Ever Did It)"	-	-
