= Kung Fu Panda 3 (soundtrack) =

2016 soundtrack album

Kung Fu Panda 3 (Original Motion Picture Soundtrack)

Film score by Hans Zimmer
- Released: January 29, 2016
- Recorded: December 2014 – October 2015
- Studios: Abbey Road Studios (London, England); Air Studios (London, England); Shanghai Broadcast Studio (Shanghai, China); Remote Control Productions (Santa Monica, California, United States)
- Genres: Classical; traditional; Chinese
- Length: 69:17
- Label: Sony Classical
- Producers: Hans Zimmer; Lorne Balfe

Hans Zimmer chronology
| Woman in Gold (2015) | Kung Fu Panda 3 (2016) | Batman v Superman: Dawn of Justice (2016) |

Kung Fu Panda 3 (Original Motion Picture Soundtrack) is the soundtrack album to the 2016 film Kung Fu Panda 3, the third instalment in the Kung Fu Panda franchise and the sequel to Kung Fu Panda 2 (2011). The film score is composed by Hans Zimmer, who scored the previous instalments with John Powell, but the latter did not return for the third instalment, thereby Zimmer being credited as the sole composer for the franchise. The album was released by Sony Classical Records on January 29, 2016, to positive critical response.

== Development ==
On July 25, 2014, it was announced that Hans Zimmer, who co-scored the first two instalments with John Powell, would return to score the film. Zimmer collaborated with renowned Asian musicians as "the only way you can really connect with a culture is to be respectful of the people who actually are that culture and play from that culture". Chinese pianist Lang Lang, Chinese cellist Jian Wang, erhu musician Guo Gan scoring the instrumental portions and Shanghai Roxi Musical Studio Choirs perform the choir, and several traditional Chinese instruments were used in the score, as Zimmer said "the great thing about being in music and it's happened to me time and time again where I get to work with people from different cultures. They might not speak English or German or whatever is useful in my case, you spend a couple of hours with the translator not getting anywhere and then you just sit down and start playing and then four or five hours go by and you haven't noticed that you haven't said a word to each other but it works really well."

Recording of the score took place from December 2014 – October 2015 at various studios, including Abbey Road Studios and Air Studios in London, Shanghai Broadcast Studio in Shanghai, China and Remote Control Productions in Santa Monica, California, United States. The London Session Orchestra and Metro Voices collaborated for the orchestral and choral portions. Taiwanese pop singer Jay Chou, and Canadian-Taiwanese young singer Patrick Brasca, perform the main theme "Try" in the end credits. Powell did not return for the third installment but despite this, most of the themes he collaborated with Zimmer were worked into the score. The soundtrack also includes additional music composed and produced by Chinese-American composer Nathan Wang, and Scottish composers Lorne Balfe, and Paul Mounsey, assisting Zimmer in the film score.

== Track listing ==
| No. | Title | Performer(s) | Length |
|---|---|---|---|
| 1. | "Oogway's Legacy" | Hans Zimmer; Lang Lang | 2:00 |
| 2. | "Hungry for Lunch (Note: The cue contain original themes co-composed by John Powell)" | Zimmer | 1:15 |
| 3. | "The Power of Chi" | Zimmer | 4:12 |
| 4. | "The Arrival of Kai (Note: The cue contains portions of the garage rock song "I'm So Sorry" by the American pop rock band Imagine Dragons)" | Zimmer | 2:01 |
| 5. | "A New Father" | Zimmer | 3:13 |
| 6. | "The Hall of Heroes" | Zimmer | 2:59 |
| 7. | "The Legend of Kai" | Zimmer | 4:01 |
| 8. | "The Panda Village" | Zimmer | 3:39 |
| 9. | "Mei Mei's Ribbon Dance" | Zimmer | 2:05 |
| 10. | "Jaded" | Zimmer | 3:54 |
| 11. | "How To Be a Panda" | Zimmer | 1:53 |
| 12. | "Portrait of Mom" | Zimmer; Lang Lang | 1:48 |
| 13. | "Po Belongs" | Zimmer; Lang Lang | 2:52 |
| 14. | "Kai is Closer" | Zimmer | 3:15 |
| 15. | "Two Fathers" | Zimmer | 3:11 |
| 16. | "The Battle of Legends" | Zimmer | 3:31 |
| 17. | "The Spirit Realm" | Zimmer | 3:18 |
| 18. | "The Dragon Warrior" | Zimmer | 2:51 |
| 19. | "Passing the Torch" | Zimmer | 4:15 |
| 20. | "Father and Son" | Zimmer | 3:00 |
| 21. | "Kung Fu Fighting (Celebration Time)" | Roxi Musical Studio Choirs / Metro Voices | 2:59 |
| 22. | "Try" | Patrick Brasca; Jay Chou | 4:00 |
| 23. | "Kung Fu Fighting" | The Vamps | 3:05 |
| Total length: | | | 69:17 |

== Reception ==
James Southall of Movie Wave wrote "The score as a whole may be somewhat disposable fun but it is fun, blessed at times with the same kind of swagger and twinkle in the eye as the Pirates of the Caribbean scores at their best (if not the array of strong themes) – “The Dragon Warrior" for instance is an action highlight that really is Zimmer at his lighthearted but boisterous best. This is possibly the best of these scores so far and for an undemanding hour's listening you can't really go far wrong." Filmtracks.com wrote "The album nicely consolidates the song placements to its conclusion, but the score selections are not provided in film order. Nor do they really maintain a cohesive narrative flow. Still, don't be surprised if you append a handful of cues from this score to any compilation of favorites from the stronger Kung Fu Panda 2. Once again, contracts permitting, Zimmer and his ghostwriters don't seem to care about the issue of appropriate, prominent credit for these works, but it's only fair to enlighten listeners who have the mistaken impression that Zimmer writes all or most of this material himself. This is only marginally a Zimmer score."

Pete Simons of Synchrotones gave 4/5 to the score saying "Hans Zimmer's Kung Fu Panda 3 is an incredibly fun ride in a fast machine. Arguably the best score Powell never wrote. When it's fast and fun and zany it sounds just like John Powell. When it's more noble and introvert it is really beautiful, poignantly so, with solo cello and various 'ethnic' instruments taking the lead – in a way that is very Zimmer. It is well written, just brilliantly orchestrated, and performed with gusto by … whoever performed it. All that whackiness does get a little tiresome, but in all this is a great album to cheer you up any ol' day." Unger the Radar wrote "Hans Zimmer is a truly great composer and he is celebrated the world over for his diverse and powerful music. His work on the Kung Fu Panda films is no different and the third film's soundtrack is the stuff of absolute legends. This is a fantastic musical trilogy and should be appreciated by not just film score aficionados but by lovers of all things musically."

Writing for Blueprintreview, Judomeh gave 4 out of 5 stars, saying "it was a nice little soundtrack for a much loved franchise which supports the film in the best possible way". Max Nicholson of IGN wrote "Hans Zimmer returned to do the score, which at this point has become a staple of the series." Regarding Kai's (J. K. Simmons) main theme, Stephanie Zacharek of Time had stated that Zimmer "gives him a terrific, swaggering Ennio Morricone-style bad-guy theme".

== Personnel ==
Credits adapted from CD liner notes.

- Music – Hans Zimmer
- Additional music – Paul Mounsey, Lorne Balfe, Nathan Wang
- Production – Hans Zimmer, Lorne Balfe
- Additional arrangements – Nathan Wang, Stephen Hilton
- Recording – Geoff Foster, Chris Barrett
- Additional recording – Alan Meyerson, Claude Samard Polikar, John Witt Chapman, Seth Waldmann, Mike Xu
- Music editing – Adam Smalley, Catherine Wilson
- Score editing – Chris Barrett, Fiona Cruickshank
- Mixing – Alan Meyerson
- Mastering – Gavin Lurssen
- Music librarian – Jill Streater
- Assistant music librarian – Andrew Green
- Digital recordist – Laurence Anslow
- Assistant engineer – Alex Ferguson, Alfredo Pasquel, Alvin Wee, Forest Christenson, John Witt Chapman, Stefano Civetta, Tom Leach
- Technical engineer – Chuck Choi, Max Aruj, Steffen Thum, Stephanie McNally
- Technical assistance – Jacqueline Friedberg, Joe Cho, Julian Pastorelli, Lauren Bousfield, Sydney Harrison
- Studio manager – Alison Burton, Shalini Singh
- Music production supervisor – Charlene Ann Huang
- Design – WLP Ltd.

London Session Orchestra

- Orchestration – Joan Martorell, Òscar Senén
- Concertmaster – Perry Montague-Mason
- Conductor – Gavin Greenaway
- Orchestra contractor – Isobel Griffiths
- Assistant orchestra contractor – Lucy Whalley
- Recording – Adam Miller, Jon Bailey
- Instruments
- Alto flute – Siobhan Grealy
- Bass – Allen Walley, Andy Marshall, Beverley Jones, David Johnson, Mary Scully, Paul Kimber, Richard Pryce, Steve Williams, Steve Mair
- Bass and contrabass clarinet – David Fuest, Martin Robertson
- Bass trombone – Andy Wood, Dave Vines, Richard Edwards
- Bassoon – Elizabeth Trigg, Richard Skinner, Stephen Maw, Rachel Simms
- Cello – Adrian Bradbury, Bozidar Vukotic, Dave Daniels*, Frank Schaefer, Ian Burdge, Jacky Thomas, John Heley, Jonny Byers, Jonathan Williams, Katherine Jenkinson, Nick Cooper, Paul Kegg, Tim Gill, Anthony Lewis, Tony Woollard
- Clarinet – Anthony Pike, Jon Carnac, David Fuest, Martin Robertson
- Contrabassoon – Rachel Simms
- Cor anglais – Jane Marshall
- Drums – Ash Soan
- Electric cello – Peter Gregson
- French horn – Corinne Bailey, David Pyatt, Hugh Sisley, John Thurgood, Martin Owen, Michael Thompson, Nicholas Korth, Nigel Black, Phil Woods, Philip Eastop, Richard Berry
- Guzheng, pipa, dulcimer – Vivian Milanova
- Harp, koto – Hu Mee
- Oboe – Jane Marshall, Rosie Jenkins, Ruth Bolister
- Percussion – Chris Baron, Frank Ricotti, Gary Kettel
- Piccolo flute – Anna Noakes, Eliza Marshall, Siobhan Grealy
- Trombone – Ed Tarrant, Mark Nightingale
- Trumpet – Andy Crowley, Kate Moore, Paul Mayes, Simon Munday
- Tuba – Owen Slade
- Viola – Andy Parker, Bruce White, Clive Howard, Don McVay, George Robertson, Gillianne Haddow, Ian Rathbone, Kate Musker, Paul Cassidy, Peter Lale, Phil d'Arcy, Rachel Bolt, Reiad Chibah, Roger Chase, Rusen Gunes, Vicci Wardman
- Violin – Alison Dods, Boguslaw Kostecki, Cathy Thompson, Christina Emanuel, Daniel Bhattacharya, Dai Emanuel, Liz Edwards, Emil Chakalov, Emlyn Singleton, Everton Nelson, Ian Humphries, Jackie Shave, Jackie Hartley, Jim McLeod, John Bradbury, Jonathan Evans-Jones, Katherine Mayes, Kathy Gowers, Lorraine McAslan, Maciej Rakowski, Magnus Johnston, Mark Berrow, Martin Burgess, Oli Langford, Patrick Kiernan, Paul Willey, Pete Hanson, Philippa Ibbotson, Rita Manning, Roger Garland, Simon Baggs, Sue Briscoe, Warren Zielinski, Perry Montague-Mason
- Woodwind – Papa Ginou

Shanghai Roxi Musical Studio Choirs

- Choirmaster – Apple Hu, Army Wang
- Conductor – Eric Whitacre
- Recording – Mo Jiawei

Metro Voices

- Choirmaster – Jenny O'Grady
- Conductor – Matt Dunkley
- Recording – Sam OKell

Soloists

- Cello – Jian Wang
- Erhu, gaohu – Guo Gan, Karen Hua-Qi Han Ottosson
- Guzheng – Cynthia Hsiang
- Percussion – Satnam S.Ramgotra, Sheila E.
- Pipa – Wu Man

Vocals

- Alto vocals – Alexandra Gibson, Catriana Sanderson, Chloe Morgan, Claire Henry, Harriet Syndercombe Court, Helen Brooks, Helen Parker, Helen Templeton, Jacqui Taylor, Jenny O'Grady, Kate Batter, Kate Bishop, Lana Walker, Lindsay Ashworth, Lucy Ballard, Morag MacKay, Nicola Beckley, Pippa Duffy, Rachel Weston, Rebecca Trehearn, Ruth Kiang, Vanessa Heine, Wendy Nieper, Yona Dunsford
- Bass vocals – Andrew Playfoot, David Porter Thomas, Don Greig, James Mawson, Lawrence Wallington, Lawrence White, Michael Dore, Neil Bellingham, Paul Greir, Peter Snipp, Simon Grant, Stephen Weller
- Soprano vocals – Alice Fearn, Ann De Renais, Anne Maria Cullum, Caroline Fitzgerald, Catherine Bott, Eleanor Bowers Jolley, Eleanor Meynell, Elizabeth Tiley, Emily Caulderwood, Emma Brain Gabbot, Grace Davidson, Helen Hobson, Helen Power, Ildiko Allen, Jacqueline Barron, Joanna Forbes, Juliet Schiemann, Kirsty Hoiles, Laura Bursey, Lucy Grorrioch, Nicki Kennedy, Rosemary Forbes Butler, Sarah Eyden, Sarah Ryan
- Tenor vocals – Alastair Brookshaw, Andrew Busher, Ben Alwyn Francis, Ben Fleetwood Smyth, CJ Neale, Dan Auchincloss, Gerard O'Beirne, Richard Henders, Sam Burkey, Scott Davies, Simon Davies, Tom Pearce
- Additional vocals – Al Clay, Antony Genn, Czarina Russell, Dee Lewis Clay, Joe West, Kim Chandler, Martin Slattery
