= Batman v Superman: Dawn of Justice (soundtrack) =

Batman v Superman: Dawn of Justice (Original Motion Picture Soundtrack)

Soundtrack album by Hans Zimmer and Junkie XL
- Released: March 18, 2016
- Studios: Eastwood Scoring Stage (Warner Bros., Burbank, California); Streisand Scoring Stage (Sony Pictures, Culver City)
- Genre: Soundtrack
- Length: 71:44
- Labels: WaterTower; Sony Classical
- Producers: Hans Zimmer; Junkie XL; Alan Meyerson; Steve Mazzaro

Hans Zimmer chronology
Kung Fu Panda 3 (2016)	Batman v Superman: Dawn of Justice (2016)	The Last Face (2016)

Junkie XL chronology
Deadpool (2016)	Batman v Superman: Dawn of Justice (2016)	Brimstone (2016)

Professional ratings
Review scores
Source	Rating
AllMusic	3.5/5 stars
Zanobard Reviews	8/10
Sputnikmusic	3.5/5 stars

Batman v Superman: Dawn of Justice (Original Motion Picture Soundtrack) is the soundtrack to the film of the same name composed and arranged by Hans Zimmer and Junkie XL. It was released on March 18, 2016, by WaterTower Music. The exclusive deluxe edition of the album contains five bonus tracks, entitled "Blood of My Blood", "Vigilante", "May I Help You, Mr. Wayne?", "They Were Hunters" and "Fight Night". The soundtrack also features the Eric Whitacre Singers.

The style elements from "Is She with You?" were used as the theme music for the subsequent Wonder Woman soundtrack, while a variation of the piece "Beautiful Lie" is used in the film Wonder Woman 1984.

== Track listing ==
Standard edition
No.	Title	Length
1.	"Beautiful Lie"	3:47
2.	"Their War Here"	4:35
3.	"The Red Capes Are Coming"	3:32
4.	"Day of the Dead"	4:02
5.	"Must There Be a Superman?"	3:59
6.	"New Rules"	4:03
7.	"Do You Bleed?"	4:36
8.	"Problems Up Here"	4:25
9.	"Black and Blue"	8:31
10.	"Tuesday"	4:01
11.	"Is She with You?"	5:45
12.	"This Is My World"	6:24
13.	"Men Are Still Good (The Batman Suite)"	14:04
Total length:		71:44

Deluxe edition bonus tracks
No.	Title	Length
1.	"Blood of My Blood"	4:26
2.	"Vigilante"	3:54
3.	"May I Help You, Mr. Wayne?"	3:28
4.	"They Were Hunters"	2:46
5.	"Fight Night"	4:20
Total length:		90:38

=== Source music not included or credited on the soundtrack ===
#	Title	Performer(s)
1	"Kang Ling (An Instrument Made From A Human Thigh Bone)"	Monks of the Dip Tse Chok Ling Monastery, Dharamsala
2	"Night and Day"	Richard Cheese & Lounge Against The Machine (Cole Porter covers)
3	"Ev'ry Time We Say Goodbye"	Richard Cheese & Lounge Against The Machine (Cole Porter covers)
4	"Shostakovich: Waltz II"	Royal Concertgebouw Orchestra, Riccardo Chailly
5	"Amazing Grace"	John Allan (traditional)
6	"Amazing Grace"	Canadian Scottish Regiment Pipes and Drums & United States Third Marine Aircraft Wing Band (traditional)

== Personnel ==
Music from the soundtrack was performed by the Hollywood Studio Symphony. The orchestra was conducted by Nick Glennie-Smith and Junkie XL, while the choir, the Eric Whitacre Singers, was conducted by Gavin Greenaway. Additional music was provided by Andrew Kawczynski, Steve Mazzaro, and Benjamin Wallfisch.

== Charts ==
=== Weekly charts ===
Chart (2016)	Peak position
Australian Albums (ARIA)	34
Austrian Albums (Ö3 Austria)	67
Canadian Albums (Billboard)	60
Belgian Albums (Ultratop Flanders)	47
Belgian Albums (Ultratop Wallonia)	64
Dutch Albums (Album Top 100)	86
French Albums (SNEP)	64
Irish Albums (IRMA)	44
Italian Compilation Albums (FIMI)	14
Swiss Albums (Schweizer Hitparade)	65
UK Albums (Official Charts)	31
US Billboard 200	25
US Soundtrack Albums (Billboard)	2

=== Year-end charts ===
Chart (2016)	Position
US Soundtrack Albums (Billboard)	20

== Reception ==
The soundtrack received majorly favorable reviews from critics. Zanobard Reviews praised the score, stating that "Hans Zimmer and Junkie XL's Batman V Superman: Dawn Of Justice is a truly fantastic score, with the exquisite use of themes (both old and new) being the absolute highlight". In AllMusic, Marcy Donelson characterized the score as "pulsing and ominous", stating that the entry features "clamorous orchestral fare boosted by occasional choir and electronics, altogether providing near operatic accompaniment as the two superheroes are forced to do battle". In Sputnikmusic, it was stated that the score "isn't quite an epic standalone soundtrack, but when paired with its accompanying film, it elevates certain scenes into the stratosphere with its healthy balance of renovated MoS motifs integrated into fresh ones to illustrate that this is indeed a turning point in the DCEU."
