= Cassidy (rapper) =

American rapper (born 1982)

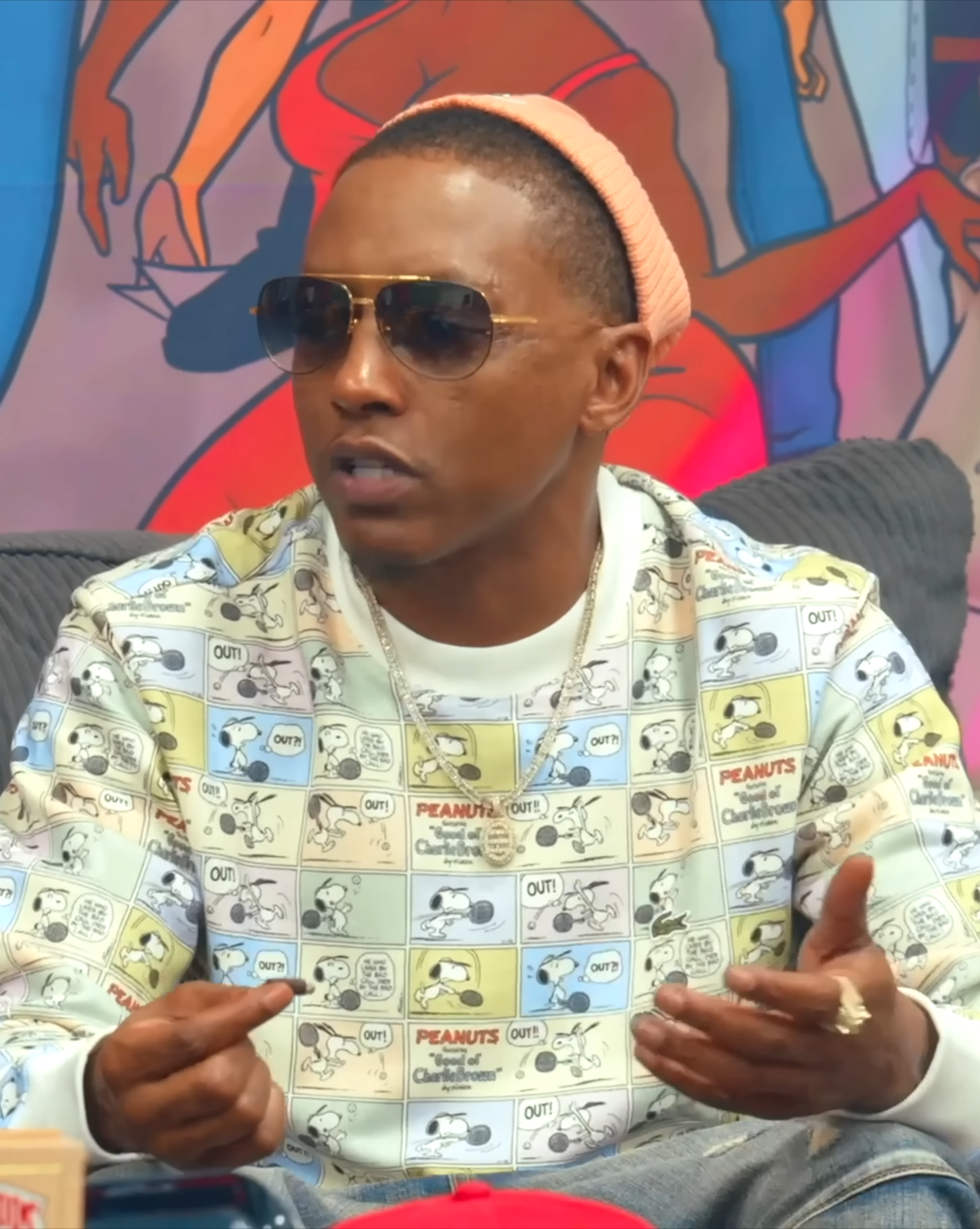
- Cassidy in 2023

Background information
- Born: Barry Adrian Reese; July 7, 1982 (age 44); Philadelphia, Pennsylvania, U.S.
- Genre: East Coast hip-hop
- Occupations: Rapper; songwriter
- Works: Cassidy discography
- Years active: 2000–present
- Labels: BMG (former); J (former); Full Surface (former)
- Member of: Larsiny
- Producer(s): Swizz Beatz

Barry Adrian Reese (born July 7, 1982), better known by his stage name Cassidy, is an American rapper. He first garnered attention for his freestyles and competitions as a battle rapper in the late 1990s, and formed the Philadelphia-based hip hop collective Larsiny by the end of the decade. American record producer Swizz Beatz discovered the group in 2000 and signed Cassidy to his newly-established Full Surface Records, in a joint venture with J Records. He adopted a commercially-oriented approach with his 2003 debut single "Hotel" (featuring R. Kelly) and its follow-up, "Get No Better" (featuring Mashonda); the former peaked at number four on the Billboard Hot 100 while both preceded the release of his debut studio album, Split Personality (2004).

The album peaked at number two on the U.S. Billboard 200, while his second album, I'm a Hustla (2005), peaked at number five and was supported by the lead single of the same name—which received platinum certification by the Recording Industry Association of America (RIAA). Following an eight-month incarceration and preceding legal battle, his third album, B.A.R.S. The Barry Adrian Reese Story (2007), was met with critical acclaim and peaked at number ten on the Billboard 200, also spawning the Billboard Hot 100 top-40 single "My Drink n My 2 Step" (featuring Swizz Beatz). It served as his final release on a major label, and he signed with Carmelo Anthony's Kross Over Entertainment to release his fourth album, C.A.S.H. (2010), which narrowly entered the Billboard 200. He has since self-released three albums under his own label, Mayhem Music.

== Musical career ==
=== 2000–05: Split Personality and I'm a Hustla ===
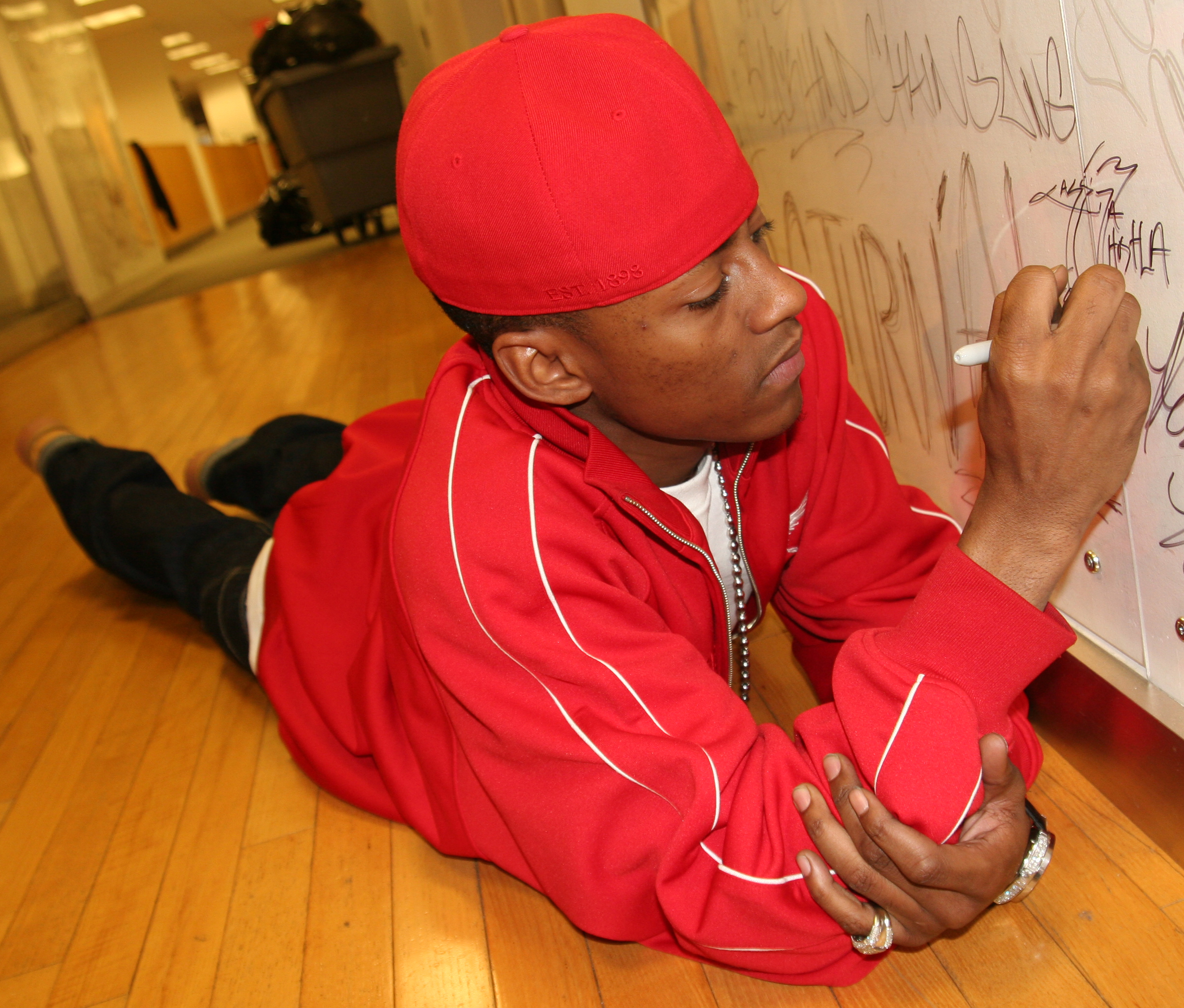
Cassidy in 2005

In 2000, Cassidy was a member of the Philadelphia, Pennsylvania-based rap group Larsiny. Larsiny was discovered in Philadelphia by record producer Swizz Beatz's father Terrence Dean, and in turn, the group signed to the Ruff Ryders-subsidiary label TD Entertainment. Their debut commercial appearance was the song "Ryde Or Die Boyz" from the July 2000 album Ryde or Die Vol. 2. Cassidy co-wrote the single "Got It All" for fellow Philadelphia rapper Eve, which was also from the album.

In 2002, Cassidy signed a recording contract with Swizz Beatz's Full Surface imprint, under the aegis of Clive Davis's J Records. On November 29, 2003, he released his commercial debut single, "Hotel", featuring R. Kelly. The song reached the Top 10 of the U.S. Billboard Hot 100 chart. The second single, "Get No Better", features Mashonda. On March 16, 2004, Cassidy released his debut album, Split Personality. It was certified gold by the Recording Industry Association of America (RIAA), the following month.

On April 15, 2005, Cassidy released the single "I'm a Hustla". The next single, "B-Boy Stance", features vocals and production from his mentor, Swizz Beatz. On June 28, 2005, Cassidy released his second studio album, I'm a Hustla. It debuted at number five on the US Billboard 200 chart, with 93,000 copies sold in the first week.

=== 2006–11: B.A.R.S. and C.A.S.H. ===
In 2006, after his release from prison and recovering from an auto wreck, Cassidy began work on his third studio album, B.A.R.S. The Barry Adrian Reese Story. The album was released on November 6, 2007, debuting at number 10 on the Billboard 200, with 63,000 copies sold in the first week. The album was led by the single "My Drink n My 2 Step", featuring vocals and production from Swizz Beatz.

In late 2009, Cassidy signed with Carmelo Anthony's label Kross Over Entertainment. While preparing his fourth studio album, he released a mixtape series entitled Apply Pressure. On August 24, 2010, Cassidy released the five-track EP Face 2 Face, with the promotional single "Face 2 Face". On November 16, 2010, Cassidy's fourth studio album, C.A.S.H. (Cass a Straight Hustla) was released. On its first week it had sold about 5,200 copies, much lower than his previous studio albums. "Drumma Bass" was the only official single from the album.

=== 2012–present: Mr. Hip-Hop and Da Science ===
On May 21, 2012, Cassidy hosted a release party for his mixtape Mayhem Music. On July 8, 2012, he released the mixtape Mayhem Music: AP3. After fellow Philly rapper Meek Mill said he would battle Cassidy, which Cassidy later said he would accept if the money was right. They participated in a "twitter beef" after which Cassidy released "The Diary of a Hustla" which was originally thought to be a diss towards Meek. This was later refuted by Cassidy. They both were asking for $100,000 each for the battle to take place. However, after Meek Mill dissed Cassidy's song "Condom Style" (a remake of Psy's "Gangnam Style") Cassidy released a song titled "Me, Myself & iPhone" where he took shots at Meek Mill. Afterwards, Meek Mill responded with the diss track "Repo" which Mill later said would be the final diss record he would release against Cassidy. Cassidy later said the feud was not personal, saying it was all in the spirit of hip hop. On January 6, 2013, Cassidy released a 10-minute-long diss response titled "Raid". On October 6, Cassidy released his album Da Science.

In April 2025, Cassidy released the single "I Ain't See Nothin'".

== Other ventures ==
In 2007, Cassidy signed a deal as the "new face" for Lot 29's fall clothing line. In 2009, Cassidy appeared in the comedy film, Next Day Air.

In late 2012, Cassidy remade South Korean singer Psy's international hit single "Gangnam Style, re-titling it "Condom Style". The remake reportedly earned Cassidy an endorsement deal with Trojan.

In 2013, Cassidy released a biography titled Behind B.A.R.S: The Authorized Biography of Cassidy.

In late 2014, Cassidy returned to battle rap by battling Los Angeles–based veteran Dizaster, on December 6, 2014, at Filmon.com's "Ether" event.

== Personal life ==
=== Murder case ===
On April 15, 2005, three men, including AR-Ab and Cassidy, armed with pistols and an AK-47 assault rifle, fired on three unarmed men during an argument that occurred in the West Oak Lane, Philadelphia. Desmond Hawkins was killed by a shot in the back. Hawkins' two other friends were treated at hospitals for gunshot wounds and released.

On June 9, a warrant was issued for Cassidy's arrest on charges of murder, attempted murder, reckless endangerment, aggravated assault, conspiracy and weapons possession. Cassidy surrendered to Philadelphia police on the afternoon of June 17. At his arraignment on Saturday, June 18, he was denied bail, and sent to Philadelphia's Curran-Fromhold Correctional Facility, a high-security prison, where he would serve his time during the trial and after he was sentenced.

Cassidy's murder case took a turn when the primary witness withdrew his confession. This resulted in the judge stating that Cassidy would stand trial for third-degree murder. On August 16, 2005, Municipal Judge Marsha Neifield ruled that prosecutors had sufficient evidence to charge Cassidy with third-degree murder, attempted murder and weapons offenses. This was later overturned to the original, first degree charge - negating the possibility of parole. On January 25, 2006, Cassidy was convicted of involuntary manslaughter, two counts of aggravated assault and possession of an instrument of crime for his involvement in the shooting. He was sentenced to 11 to 23 months in prison plus probation and was credited with the 7 months he had already served.

Cassidy was released from Pennsylvania's Curran-Fromhold Correctional Facility on March 2, 2006, after serving eight months.

Cassidy talks about his arrest and time in prison in the 2011 film Rhyme and Punishment, which documents various hip-hop artists who have done county jail or state/federal prison time.

=== Car wreck ===
Cassidy was seriously injured in a vehicle wreck on the night of October 5, 2006, when a commercial truck collided with his SUV, in which he was a passenger. He was taken to the Jersey City Medical Center, where he was diagnosed with a fractured skull and several broken bones on the left side of his face. He still has visible scars from the wreck.

"I was in a coma for about seven or eight days," he said. "And then they put me into a medicated coma, so that if I woke up I wouldn't be traumatized by what I went through. When I first woke up out of my coma, I had amnesia, so I couldn't really remember everything. I didn't have full amnesia; I could remember certain things. The only people I really knew were my mom, my son, people that's real close that you knew all your life. I knew their names but even certain experiences I couldn't remember at first. I couldn't remember none of my raps, even the songs I performed—'Hotel,' 'I'm a Hustla,' none of that. The doctor told me that I suffered brain damage, but it was temporary, it wasn't permanent. So the same way it takes time for your body to heal, he said it's gonna take your brain time to heal."

== Discography ==
Studio albums

- Split Personality (2004)
- I'm a Hustla (2005)
- B.A.R.S. The Barry Adrian Reese Story (2007)
- C.A.S.H. (2010)
- Da Science (2020)
- Da Formula (2020)
- Da Wiseman (2021)

== Filmography ==
- 2009: Next Day Air as Cass
- 2011: Rhyme and Punishment as himself
- 2014: Kony Montana as a local boss
