= Yung Wun =

American rapper

- Born: James Carlton Anderson; May 5, 1982 (age 44); Atlanta, Georgia, U.S.
- Genres: Hip hop
- Occupations: Rapper; songwriter
- Years active: 1999–present
- Labels: BMG; J; Full Surface; Dark Society; Ryde or Die

James Carlton Anderson (born May 5, 1982), also known by his stage name Yung Wun, is an American rapper from Atlanta.

He only produced one studio album "The Dirtiest Thirstiest" in 2004

== Biography ==
Yung Wun was raised in the Eastlake Meadows housing projects, otherwise known as "Little Vietnam". Yung Wun was very quickly exposed to the effects of crime and soon became involved with several gangs. By the age of thirteen, he had fully embraced a life of criminality. Yung Wun had numerous encounters with police as he took part in random lawlessness, which landed him in the juvenile justice system.

It was during this that Yung Wun found relief through lyrical expression. He began rhyming as a form of escape. He won several oratorical contests and writing awards. Yung Wun's grandmother, Vera, regularly pleaded with him to turn his life around, to get off the streets and concentrate on his talents in speaking and writing. In the single most pivotal moment of his young life, Yung Wun's grandmother died in his arms. Overwhelmed by her death, he was left to contemplate his future path. He decided to clean up his life and choose a more legal path. Yung Wun devoted his life to his art form.

== Career ==
Inspired by the works of his rap idols, notably Tupac Shakur, The Notorious B.I.G. and DMX, he began showcasing his talents all over metro Atlanta, grabbing the attention of several music executives. Yung Wun appeared on several underground down-south projects while he endured the underhandedness of the music industry.

In 1998, his career took an upward turn when he signed with producers from Dark Society Recordings, an Atlanta-based production company. The team completed an album project and presented it to platinum selling super producer, Swizz Beatz. Swizz Beatz was impressed with Yung Wun's ability and presented the album to Ruff Ryders executives. Yung Wun began his affiliation with Ruff Ryders in 1999, and his commercial debut appearance was his feature on the music video version of "Down Bottom" with Drag-On. Following this appearance, Yung Wun appeared more prominently on Ruff Ryders albums. He was featured on three songs from the second Ruff Ryders compilation album, Ryde or Die Vol. 2: Stomp, Ryde Or Die Boyz, and WW III. He was also featured on Jadakiss' first solo album and appeared on Swizz Beatz compilation on DreamWorks, G.H.E.T.T.O. Stories.

Yung Wun's lyrical style consists of a blend of down south energy and ferocious. His first solo album The Dirtiest Thirstiest was released in 2004 on J Records co-signed under Arnold Schwarzenegger. He also created "Yung Wun Anthem", which was included on the soundtrack for EA Sport's "Madden NFL 2005" video game.

== Discography ==
=== Albums ===
List of albums, with selected chart positions
Title	Album details	Peak chart positions		
Title	Album details	US Heat.	US R&B	US Rap
The Dirtiest Thirstiest	Released: December 7, 2004 (US); Labels: Full Surface, J; Formats: CD, digital download, LP	11	50	24

=== Singles ===
List of singles, with selected chart positions, showing year released and album name
Title	Year	Peak chart positions				Album
Title	Year	US	US R&B	US Rap	US Rhyth.	Album
"Yung Wun Anthem"	2004	—	—	—	—	The Dirtiest Thirstiest
"Tear It Up" (featuring DMX, David Banner and Lil' Flip)	2004	76	39	21	26	The Dirtiest Thirstiest
"Walk It, Talk It" (featuring David Banner)	2004	—	97	—	—	The Dirtiest Thirstiest
"—" denotes a recording that did not chart.

=== Promotional singles ===
List of promotional singles, with selected chart positions, showing year released and album name
Title	Year	Peak chart positions	Album
Title	Year	US R&B	Album
"WW III" (with Snoop Dogg, Scarface and Jadakiss)	2000	77	Ryde or Die Vol. 2
"What U Come Round Here For"	2002	—	Non-album singles
"Pop It"	2002	—	Non-album singles
"I Tried to Tell Ya"	2004	—	The Dirtiest Thirstiest
"—" denotes a recording that did not chart.
