= Get It on the Floor =

Single by DMX featuring Swizz Beatz

from the album Grand Champ
- Released: December 30, 2003
- Recorded: 2003
- Genre: East Coast hip-hop; hardcore hip-hop
- Length: 4:28
- Label: Ruff Ryders; Def Jam
- Songwriter(s): Earl Simmons; Kasseem Dean
- Producer(s): Swizz Beatz

DMX singles chronology
"Where the Hood At?" (2003)	"Get It on the Floor" (2003)	"King Thing" (2004)

"Get It on the Floor" is a song by American rapper DMX, released as the second single from his fifth album Grand Champ (2003). The song features vocals and production from longtime collaborator, Swizz Beatz. The song peaked at No. 57 on the Billboard Hot R&B/Hip-Hop Songs chart, No. 43 on the German Singles Chart and No. 34 on the UK Singles Chart.

== Charts ==
Chart (2004)	Peak position
US Hot R&B/Hip-Hop Songs	57
German Singles Chart	43
UK Singles Chart	34
New Zealand (Recorded Music NZ)	44

== Track listing ==
1. Get It on the Floor featuring Swizz Beatz (Radio)
2. Get It on the Floor featuring Swizz Beatz (Dirty)
3. Get It on the Floor (Instrumental)
4. We 'Bout to Blow featuring Big Stan (Radio)
5. We 'Bout to Blow featuring Big Stan (Dirty)
6. We 'Bout to Blow (Instrumental)
