= Got It All (Eve song) =

2000 single by Ruff Ryders featuring Eve and Jadakiss

Single by Ruff Ryders featuring Eve and Jadakiss

from the album Ryde or Die Vol. 2
- Released: 2000
- Length: 3:47
- Label: Ruff Ryders; Interscope
- Songwriter(s): Eve; Jason Phillips; Sheldon Harris; Barry Reese; Sean Lassiter
- Producer(s): Teflon

Eve singles chronology
"Remember Them Days" (2000)	"Got It All" (2000)	"Who's That Girl?" (2001)

Jadakiss singles chronology
"The Best of Me" (2000)	"Got It All" (2000)	"Back 2 Life 2001" (2001)

Music video
- "Got It All" on YouTube

"Got It All" is a song by American hip hop collective and record label Ruff Ryders and the lead single from their second compilation album Ryde or Die Vol. 2 (2000). It features American rappers Eve and Jadakiss. The song was produced by Teflon.

== Critical reception ==
Steve "Flash" Juon of RapReviews wrote favorably of the production, commenting "gives the song a Carribean [sic] twist that is as irresistably [sic] catchy as Eve's 'bad bitch' charm." In a review of Ryde or Die Vol. 2, Jason Birchmeier of AllMusic cited the song as one of the moments when the producers particularly "lay down equally stunning soundscapes".

== Charts ==
Chart (2000)	Peak position
US Billboard Hot 100	88
US Hot R&B/Hip-Hop Songs (Billboard)	27
US Hot Rap Songs (Billboard)	9
