= J Records =

American record label

- Parent company: Bertelsmann Music Group (BMG) (2000–2004); Sony BMG Music Entertainment (2004–2008); Sony Music Entertainment (SME) (2008–2011)
- Founded: 2000; 26 years ago
- Founder: Clive Davis
- Defunct: October 7, 2011
- Status: Defunct
- Distributors: RCA Music Group; RCA Records; (outside the US)
- Genre: Various
- Country of origin: United States

J Records was an American record label owned and operated by Bertelsmann Music Group until it was transferred to Sony Music Entertainment when they acquired all of BMG's record labels in late 2008 at the end of their merger. It was distributed through the RCA Music Group. The label was founded in 2000 by Clive Davis and was dissolved into RCA Records in 2011.

== Company history ==
J Records was founded in 2000 by industry veteran Clive Davis with $150 million in financing from BMG, after his ousting from Arista Records the same year, and initially operated as an independently managed company distributed through BMG. Clive Davis' office and the headquarters of J Records were initially located in the Waldorf-Astoria Hotel. Olivia was the first artist to sign with J Records but was later dropped because of poor album sales.

In February 2001, Busta Rhymes signed with J, bringing his Flipmode Records imprint and its roster, including Flipmode Squad and Rah Digga, to the label. The label also found success with its multi-platinum record inaugural release, Songs in A Minor, the debut album of Alicia Keys, which sold over 12 million copies worldwide. The same year, Lyric signed to the label and became the first female group act under J Records. By late 2001, J Records attained another success with the platinum-selling debut album by O-Town. Later, established artists like D'Angelo, Luther Vandross, Jamie Foxx, and Monica would join the J roster, the latter three going on to find multi-platinum success with the label. That same year, Clive Davis and J negotiated a joint venture deal with rapper and record producer Swizz Beatz, which culminated in the founding of Swizz Beatz's label Full Surface Records. The roster included Mashonda and Cassidy. J closed out 2001 with Busta Rhymes's fifth studio album, Genesis. Debuting and peaking in the top 10 on the Billboard 200, Genesis was a critical and commercial success, being certified platinum by the RIAA. J artists Rah Diggah and Flipmode Squad also made guest appearances on the album.

In 2002, BMG bought a majority stake in the label. The same year, J Records began functioning under the RCA Music Group, where Davis had been appointed president and CEO, and signed American Idol winners Fantasia and Ruben Studdard. In August 2005, J Records' operations were merged with Arista Records, although both labels continued to release their own product.

In February 2004, reports emerged that Busta Rhymes had departed J Records. Rah Digga followed Busta in leaving J the following month. That March, J and Full Surface released Cassidy’s debut studio album, Split Personality. The album’s lead single, Hotel, peaked within the top five of the Billboard Hot 100, while the second single, “Get No Better” (featuring Mashonda), followed. The album debuted in the top three of the Billboard 200 and was certified gold in America within one month.

In mid-2011, RCA Music Group underwent a restructuring which shuttered J along with sister labels Jive and Arista on October 7, 2011. RCA Records began releasing all RCA Music Group releases under RCA Records.

== Notable artists ==
- 3rd Storee
- Adam Lambert
- Christina Aguilera
- Alicia Keys
- Angie Stone
- Annie Lennox
- Aretha Franklin
- Avril Lavigne
- Baby Bash
- Bailey
- BC Jean
- Black Buddafly
- Blu Cantrell
- Boo Rossini
- Boxie
- Busta Rhymes (J/Flipmode)
- Cady Groves
- Cassidy (J/Full Surface)
- D'Angelo
- Daniel Merriweather
- Daughtry
- Deborah Cox
- Drew Sidora
- Elle Varner
- Emily King
- Erick Sermon
- Fantasia
- Flipmode Squad (J/Flipmode)
- The Fray
- Gavin DeGraw
- Hurricane Chris
- I Nine
- Inward Eye
- Jamie Foxx
- Jazmine Sullivan
- Jennifer Hudson
- Jimmy Cozier
- Kesha
- Kevin McCall
- Lamya
- Larsiny Family
- Leona Lewis
- Lil Zane
- Olivia Longott
- Liza Minnelli
- Luke and Q
- Lyric
- Luther Vandross
- Mario
- Marsha Ambrosius
- Maroon 5 (J/Octone)
- Mashonda (J/Full Surface)
- Mike Posner
- Monica
- Next
- Nicole Wray
- Nina Sky
- One Chance
- O-Town
- Pearl Jam
- Pitbull
- Rah Digga (J/Flipmode)
- Rhymefest
- Rico Love
- R.L.
- Rob Jackson
- Rod Stewart
- Ruben Studdard
- Sammie
- Say Anything
- Silvertide
- SOiL
- Smitty
- Splender
- Tyrese Gibson
- Udora
- J. Valentine
- Wyclef Jean
- Yo Gotti
- Yung Joc
- Yung Wun
