= C.A.S.H. (album) =

Studio album by Cassidy
- Released: November 16, 2010
- Recorded: 2009–2010
- Genre: Hip hop
- Length: 58:14
- Label: Larsiny Family; Kross Over; E1
- Producer: Bink!; Cassidy; Neo Da Matrix; Vinylz; Top Notch; Reefa; Stoopid On Da Beat; Rulet Records; Boi-1da

Cassidy chronology
B.A.R.S. The Barry Adrian Reese Story (2007)	C.A.S.H. (2010)	Da Science (2020)

Singles from C.A.S.H.
- 1. "Drumma Bass" Released: September 28, 2010

Professional ratings
Review scores
Source	Rating
Allmusic	3/5 stars
RapReviews	(7/10)
SPIN	2/10 stars

C.A.S.H. is the fourth studio album by American rapper Cassidy. It was released on November 16, 2010, by Kross Over Entertainment, Larsiny Family Entertainment and E1 Music.

== Background ==
Cassidy recently explained the title of the album in an interview with MTV, which is an acronym that stands for 'Cass Always Stays Hard'.

== Singles ==
Promo Singles

- "Face 2 Face" was the first promo single and video from the album. A video was released for the single on July 31, 2010.

Official Singles

- "Drumma Bass" was the first official single from the album and it was released on September 28, 2010. A video was released for the single on October 14, 2010.

== Track listing ==
The track listing was confirmed by Amazon.com.

No.	Title	Producer(s)	Length
1.	"Face 2 Face (Intro)"	Bink!	4:47
2.	"Paper Up"	Cassidy, Neo Da Matrix	4:28
3.	"Monsta Muzik"	Bink!	3:10
4.	"One Shot"	Vinylz	3:27
5.	"All Day All Night" (featuring The Game)	Cassidy, Neo Da Matrix	3:25
6.	"Girl Like Her" (featuring Mýa)	Cassidy	3:50
7.	"Drumma Bass"	Cassidy, Top Notch	3:23
8.	"Hate Me or Love Me"	Reefa	4:17
9.	"High Off Life" (featuring Junior Reid and Notch)	Vinlyz	4:08
10.	"Awww Shit" (featuring Red Café)	Stoopid On Da Beat	4:27
11.	"I'm a G Boy" (featuring AR-AB)	Cassidy, Rulet Records	6:24
12.	"She Addicted" (featuring Naila Boss)	Cassidy, Vinylz	4:21
13.	"Peace"	Boi-1da	5:15
14.	"Music in My Blood"	Cassidy	2:53

Notes

- Track 11 - "I'm a G Boy" (featuring AR-AB) has been removed from iTunes for unknown reasons.

== Release and promotion ==
=== Apply Pressure mixtapes ===
In 2009–2010 Cassidy released his mixtape series "Apply Pressure" which was hosted by his CEO Carmelo Anthony. Although the actual album was released November the mixtapes were released in late 2009 and early 2010.

=== Face 2 Face EP ===
On August 24, 2010, Cassidy released his first EP titled Face 2 Face, to promote the album. It contains his promo single "Face 2 Face".

== Chart positions ==
Chart (2010)	Peak position
U.S. Billboard 200	145
U.S. Billboard Top R&B/Hip-Hop Albums	11
U.S. Billboard Top Rap Albums	9
