= Fred Bridges =

American record producer and musician

Fred Bridges (October 8, 1938-January 19, 2018) was an American record producer and musician.

His parents Thomas Jones and Clara Law moved to Detroit as part of the Great Migration. Bridges became interested in music at an early age and created his first band in middle school, called the Melody Skylarks. Throughout high school, Bridges created other bands and joined singing competitions.

In 1956, Bridges married and soon had two children. In 1958, he entered the United States Air Force where he also created a band, THE MARCELS. In 1960, Bridges left the Air Force and traveled back to Detroit where he got a job as a machine operator. This lasted for four years, but Bridges spent most of his time trying to enter into the music industry. He started writing music in 1961. Bridges son met up with Robert Bateman. In 1963, Bridges met up with Aron Hicks and Bridges soon produced many albums of his own. Richard Knight (soon to be replaced by Ben Knight), Robert Eaton, and Bridges were now a powerful group producing albums.

In 1967, during the riots in Detroit, the group felt they were writing a hit, "Dream". They showed it off to Ricardo Williams who was impressed. Williams opened up a label for the group. Bridges knew they needed a new name, which they came up with Brothers of Soul. The peak years for the group were from 1968 to 1969. The group was able to put more than 40 songs on disc.

In 1970, Bridges married for the second time and had three more children. By 1980, Bridges decided to leave the Brothers of Soul and become the road manager of the Four Tops.

Fred Bridges continued to reside in Detroit until his death.
