= Year of tha Boomerang =

"Year of the Boomerang"

Promotional single by Rage Against the Machine

from the album Higher Learning and Evil Empire
- Released: 1994
- Genre: Rap metal
- Length: 4:01
- Label: Epic
- Songwriters: Tim Commerford; Zack de la Rocha; Tom Morello; Brad Wilk
- Producers: Brendan O'Brien; Rage Against the Machine

Rage Against the Machine singles chronology
| "Freedom" (1994) | "Year of the Boomerang" (1994) | "Bulls on Parade" (1996) |

"Year of tha Boomerang" is a song by American rock band Rage Against the Machine. It originally appeared in the film and on the soundtrack of Higher Learning in 1994 and was eventually included on their second studio album, Evil Empire (1996). On the back of the soundtrack, the song is called "Year of the Boomerang". Although the track was released as a promotional radio CD single, it was never given a domestic release.

"Year of the Boomerang" made its live debut at Cal State Dominguez Hills in Carson, California on April 29, 1994.

== Personnel ==
Written in the liner notes as Guilty Parties:

- Zack de la Rocha – vocals
- Tim Commerford – bass
- Brad Wilk – drums
- Tom Morello – guitars

== In popular culture ==
In 2019, supporters of the QAnon movement co-opted "Year of tha Boomerang" to assert that the lyrics support the agenda of the movement's leader and allude to former President Barack Obama's citizenship, even though the song and the band's lyrics as a whole are considered left-wing, and the fact the song was released in 1994, fourteen years before Obama was elected president.
