= Bulls on Parade =

1996 single by Rage Against the Machine

Single by Rage Against the Machine

from the album Evil Empire
- Released: April 1, 1996
- Genre: Rap metal; alternative rock; nu metal
- Length: 3:51
- Label: Epic
- Songwriters: Zack de la Rocha; Tom Morello; Tim Commerford; Brad Wilk
- Producers: Brendan O'Brien, Rage Against the Machine

Rage Against the Machine singles chronology
"Year of tha Boomerang" (1994)	"Bulls on Parade" (1996)	"People of the Sun" (1996)

Alternative cover

Music video
- "Bulls on Parade" on YouTube

"Bulls on Parade" is a song by American rock band Rage Against the Machine. The second song from their second studio album, Evil Empire (1996), it was released as the album's first single on April 1, 1996. With lyrics that criticize the U.S. arms industry, the song is also known for guitarist Tom Morello's solo in which he employs a vinyl scratch effect. It was one of two songs from the band that charted on the US Billboard Hot 100, the other being "Guerrilla Radio" (#69) on their 1999 album "The Battle of Los Angeles".

In 2017, Annie Zaleski of Spin named it the thirtieth best nu metal track of all time.

== Background and composition ==
"Bulls on Parade" is performed in the key of F minor, with both the guitar and bass in E♭ tuning, at 83 BPM.

The subject matter of the lyrics deals with the U.S. military and its aggressive tactics. It mentions how the arms industry encourages war to obtain military contracts with lines such as, "Weapons, not food, not homes, not shoes, not need, just feed the war cannibal-animal," and "What we don't know keeps the contracts alive and moving."

The song is widely known for its popular guitar solo containing a vinyl scratch effect used by Tom Morello, done by turning one of his guitar's two pickups to full volume and the other off (so the pickup selector switch works like a killswitch), while rubbing his fretting hand on the strings over the pickups and flipping the pickup selector switch to create an effect akin to someone scratching a vinyl record. Morello has stated that the sound he was going for was a "sort of 'Geto Boys' sound, menacing".

== Live performances ==
"Bulls on Parade" made its live debut on January 25, 1996, at the Big Day Out festival in Sydney, Australia.

The track made its international debut on Saturday Night Live on April 13, 1996. The band was going to play another song, but were not invited back after hanging American flags upside down from their amplifiers. Steve Forbes was guest hosting that night.

At shows in the Aughts, like the Reading Festival in 2008, Rage Against the Machine dedicated the song to George Bush and Tony Blair for their role in the war on terror.

=== Covers ===
"Bulls on Parade" has been covered numerous times by different artists of various genres including British rapper Dizzee Rascal in 2009, among others.

On February 14, 2019, American rapper Denzel Curry performed a cover of the song on the Australian radio station Triple J as part of Like a Version. The cover was met with critical acclaim.

== Music video ==
The video for "Bulls on Parade" was directed by Peter Christopherson and produced by Fiz Oliver at Squeak Pictures. It premiered on The Box and MTV on April 10, 1996. On July 31, 1996, it was nominated for Best Hard Rock Video in the 1996 MTV Video Music Awards.

The video contains footage from the Sydney Big Day Out on January 25, 1996 and their side show at the Hordern Pavilion in Sydney two days later. Throughout the video shots of young people protesting in the streets with political signs, military drills, flags, and other similar images are montaged together. An antique-style film is used which promotes scratches, dust and film grain. Several scenes show people wrapping Evil Empire banners on walls, telephone posts and posting up other propaganda posters designed by Barbara Kruger. There is a scene where a character wearing a black "Libertyville" jacket with a baseball cap is painted by the renowned Phantom Street Artist Joey Krebs who paints his iconoclastic figures on city walls. This is the actual portrait created by the street artist of Tom Morello. Various lyrics are flashed on top of these scenes in a scrawled sort of chicken-scratch throughout.

== In other media ==
- "Bulls on Parade" features in Guitar Hero III: Legends of Rock where it is unlocked after defeating Tom Morello in a guitar battle. The song also appeared as a playable track in Guitar Hero Live and Rock Band in its Metal Track Pack.
- It was the theme song for the defense of the NFL's Houston Texans from 2012 until 2024, and was played in the stadium at home games to invigorate the crowd and players before games. The song was also played every time the defense stopped their opponent on third down, along with every fourth down stop resulting in a turnover on downs. The song has been officially endorsed by former Texans LB Connor Barwin.
- For Australian radio station Triple J's Like a Version, American rapper Denzel Curry covered "Bulls on Parade" with Harts on guitar.
- The Prodigy sampled the song in their 1997 single "Smack My Bitch Up."
- The New York Red Bulls use the song for the team's goal song.
- Professional wrestling legend Stone Cold Steve Austin referenced "Bulls on Parade" as inspiration for his entrance theme which he had pitched to former WWE music producer Jim Johnston after changing his in-ring gimmick which would elevate his career.

== Track listing ==
1. Bulls on Parade
2. Hadda Be Playing on the Jukebox (Live)

== Charts ==
Charts (1996)	Peak position
Australia (ARIA)	29
Belgium (Ultratop 50 Wallonia)	31
Canada Rock/Alternative (RPM)	3
Netherlands (Single Top 100)	46
Finland (Suomen virallinen lista)	1
France (SNEP)	27
New Zealand (Recorded Music NZ)	22
Norway (VG-lista)	4
Scottish Singles Sales (Official Charts)	11
Sweden (Sverigetopplistan)	9
UK Singles (Official Charts)	8
UK Rock & Metal (Official Charts)	1
US Alternative Airplay (Billboard)	11
US Mainstream Rock (Billboard)	36
US Radio Songs (Billboard)	62

== Certifications ==
Region	Certification	Certified units/sales
New Zealand (RMNZ)	2× Platinum	60,000^{‡}
United Kingdom (BPI)	Gold	400,000^{‡}
^{‡} Sales+streaming figures based on certification alone.
