= People of the Sun =

Single by Rage Against the Machine

from the album Evil Empire
- Released: August 26, 1996
- Recorded: 1995
- Studio: Cole Rehearsal (Los Angeles)
- Genre: Rap metal • funk metal
- Length: 2:30
- Label: Epic
- Songwriters: Tim Commerford; Zack de la Rocha; Tom Morello; Brad Wilk
- Producers: Brendan O'Brien; Rage Against the Machine

Rage Against the Machine singles chronology
"Bulls on Parade" (1996)	"People of the Sun" (1996)	"Vietnow" (1996)

Music video
- "People of the Sun" on YouTube

"People of the Sun" is a song by American rock band Rage Against the Machine. It was released on August 26, 1996, as the second single from their second studio album, Evil Empire (1996). Written in 1992, the song is about the Zapatista revolution. Lead vocalist Zack de la Rocha wrote the song after a visit to Chiapas in southern Mexico. "People of the Sun" also has a music video. It was nominated for a Best Hard Rock Performance Grammy in 1998, but it lost to The Smashing Pumpkins' "The End Is the Beginning Is the End".

The song has a wide variety of references, most notably the destruction of the Aztec Empire by the Spanish (see the article Five suns) and the Zoot Suit Riots of Los Angeles in 1943. De La Rocha also refers to the last Aztecan Emperor Cuauhtémoc, who was tortured and eventually executed by the Spaniards.

The single artwork of the corn, sickle and ammunition belt is a 1927 photograph taken by Italian photographer Tina Modotti in Mexico.

The final version of the song made its live debut on May 9, 1996, in Paris, France.

== Origin ==
The band were known to perform this song live as early as 1992, the only difference being Zack's lyrics. The original lyrics contained verses from their song "Fistful of Steel".

This version was first played on September 28, 1992, at the Club With No Name in West Hollywood, California.

== Music video ==
The video, directed by Peter Christopherson and produced by Fiz Oliver at Squeak Pictures, opens with shots of a dead indigenous Mexican girl (IMDB Melissa Herrera); her arm starts bleeding and the blood shows the words "Trickle down". Statistics illustrating the plight of the Zapatista Army of National Liberation are shown from a film projector being run in a morgue. Military footage of United States arms arriving in Mexico and the Zapatistas themselves are interspersed with this and shots of the band playing in front of a brick wall in about a 10 by 10 space. The version seen on MTV is the edited version; scenes of an indigenous worker being buried alive and trampled, and dead teenagers in the morgue, have been removed and replaced with military footage. The black and white documentary-style scenes of the laborer and the vaqueros are from the movie ¡Qué viva México! by Sergei Eisenstein, from the 1930s.

== Track listing ==
1. "People of the Sun"
2. "Zapata's Blood (Live)"
3. "Without a Face (Live)"

== EP version ==
In 1997, Rage Against The Machine released the "People Of The Sun" EP on 10-inch vinyl. It was distributed by Revelation Records, who had signed De La Rocha's previous band Inside Out before they split in 1990. The vinyl was shipped with a card containing information on the Zapatista movement in the Chiapas region of Mexico. In 2008, the vinyl was re-issued by Revelation Records. The Rage Against The Machine logo is off-center and vertically distorted on both the original and re-issue pressings.

=== A-Side ===
1. People of The Sun - 2:30
2. Without a Face (live)- 4:07
3. Intro (Black Steel in the Hour of Chaos) (live)- 3:37
4. Zapata's Blood (live) - 3:47

=== B-Side ===
1. Bulls on Parade - 3:48
2. Hadda Be Playing on the Jukebox (live)- 8:09

Notes

- "Intro (Black Steel in the Hour of Chaos)", "Zapata's Blood" and "Without a Face" recorded live at the Pink Pop, May 27, 1996.
- "Hadda Be Playing on the Jukebox" recorded live at Milan Dragway, Detroit, July 9, 1993.
- "Black Steel in the Hour of Chaos" (H. Shocklee/C. Ridenhour/E. Sadler/W. Drayton).
- All other songs written and arranged by Rage Against the Machine.
