= Vietnow =

Single by Rage Against the Machine

from the album Evil Empire
- B-side: "Clear the Lane"
- Released: October 1997
- Genre: Rap metal
- Length: 4:39
- Label: Epic
- Songwriters: Zack de la Rocha; Tom Morello; Tim Commerford; Brad Wilk
- Producer: Brendan O'Brien

Rage Against the Machine singles chronology
"People of the Sun" (1996)	"Vietnow" (1997)	"No Shelter" (1998)

"Vietnow" is a song by American rock band Rage Against the Machine and the final single from their album Evil Empire. Officially it is the third single from the album, as "Down Rodeo" was a US-promo release only. The "Vietnow"-single was only released in certain European countries, like France and The Netherlands.

== About ==
The cover photograph of an elderly lady seen from the back, carrying a boombox radio and walking down a mountain was taken by the Mexican photographer Graciela Iturbide in the Sonoran Desert in 1979. The original photograph is called "Mujer Ángel" and has also appeared in the black-and-white photography book, Canto a la Realidad: Fotografia Latinoamericana, 1860-1993 as compiled by Erika Billeter.

The song's lyrics concern right-wing AM radio shows, hosted by people such as Rush Limbaugh, Oliver North and Michael Reagan. The verse riffs bear a resemblance to "The Wanton Song" by Led Zeppelin, whom Tom Morello has cited as a major influence.

The lyrics "is all the world jails and churches" are perhaps influenced by the works of American novelist James Baldwin. Baldwin's 1953 novel Go Tell It on the Mountain includes the character Roy Grimes arguing with his mother and commenting, "You think that's all that's in the world is jails and churches?" At least one of James Baldwin's books is contained on Rage Against the Machine's Evil Empire liner notes.

The line "Comin down like bats from Stacey Koon" is a reference to Sgt. Stacey Koon, one of the four LAPD policemen videotaped beating black motorist Rodney King in 1991. He and Laurence Powell were the only two convicted of the four.

The lyrics "Undressed and blessed by the lord, the same devil that ran around Managua with a sword" are a reference to the CIA's involvement in sending CONTRAS into Nicaragua to shut down the Sandinista movement.

The song made its live debut during the 1996 Big Day Out festival in Australia.

== Track listing ==
1. "Vietnow"
2. "Clear the Lane"
3. "Intro/Black Steel in the Hour of Chaos" (Live)
4. "Zapata's Blood" (Live)
