= SteroidsOrHeroin =

Studio album by Future User
- Released: February 24, 2015
- Genre: Progtronic, hip-hop, punk rock
- Length: 51:01
- Label: Middle Ring Partnership
- Producer: Tim Commerford; Jordan Tarlow

Singles from SteroidsOrHeroin
- 1. "Clockwork" Released: September 2, 2014; 2. "Supernatural" Released: September 2014; 3. "Medication Nation" Released: October 2014; 4. "Mountain Lion" Released: January 28, 2015

SteroidsOrHeroin is the debut album of progressive electronic band Future User fronted by Rage Against the Machine and Audioslave bassist Tim Commerford. It was released digitally on February 24, 2015, on the record label Middle Ring Partnership.

In addition to Commerford, the band also consists of multi-instrumentalist Jordan Tarlow and drummer Jon Knox. Additional studio guitars were done by record producer Brendan O'Brien who had previously worked with Commerford during his tenure in Rage Against the Machine and Audioslave.

== Background ==
In the lead-up to the album, music videos were released for the songs "Clockwork", "Supernatural", "Medication Nation", "Mountain Lion", and "Voodoo Juju". The first four videos star a masked character named S.W.I.M. who is revealed to be Commerford at the end of the "Mountain Lion" video. The "Clockwork" video features S.W.I.M. waterboarding tennis player John McEnroe, the "Mountain Lion" video includes an appearance from cyclist Lance Armstrong, and the "Voodoo Juju" video stars Alex Lifeson, Geddy Lee, and Neil Peart of Rush.

== Reception ==
In a 4/5 Ks review, Kerrang!'s Amit Sharma said the album is "full of surprises", comparing the songs "Supernatural" and "T.F.U." to "Depeche Mode, Killing Joke, and The Prodigy having a jam. On Mars", and concluding by calling the album "bonkers" and "every bit as good as that sounds." The Heavy Press's Gerrod Harris said that the album's "clash of moods, going from something extremely energetic, to what seems like a slower, trance-like flow is done very well all throughout", that "Steroids or Heroin is one of the most unique newer act I've heard in a long time", and that "Without a doubt Steroids or Heroin is a highly experimental, hit and miss record, and although the risks taken by Future User don't always land on their feet, when it does, it borders on innovative genius."

== Track listing ==
#SteroidsOrHeroin
No.	Title	Length
1.	"Clockwork"	4:22
2.	"Mountain Lion"	5:31
3.	"Supernatural"	6:04
4.	"T.F.U."	5:35
5.	"Medication Nation"	4:46
6.	"Fools Parade"	4:29
7.	"Voodoo Juju"	4:22
8.	"Clockwork (ETC!ETC! Remix)"	5:30
9.	"Mountain Lion (AWOLNATION Remix)"	4:04
10.	"Medikation Nation (Photek Remix)"	6:18
Total length:		51:01

iTunes bonus track
No.	Title	Length
11.	"Mountain Lion (Music Video)"	5:51

== Credits ==
- Tim Commerford – lead vocals, bass guitar, producer
- Jordan Tarlow – keyboards, programming, producer
- Jon Knox – drums
- Brendan O'Brien – guitar
- Tom Syrowski – mix engineer
