= Evil Empire (album) =

Studio album by Rage Against the Machine
- Released: April 16, 1996
- Recorded: November–December 1995
- Studio: Cole Rehearsal (Los Angeles)
- Genres: Rap metal; alternative metal; nu metal; rap rock
- Length: 46:37
- Label: Epic
- Producer: Brendan O'Brien

Rage Against the Machine chronology
Rage Against the Machine (1992)	Evil Empire (1996)	Live & Rare (1998)

Singles from Evil Empire
- 1. "Bulls on Parade" Released: April 1, 1996; 2. "People of the Sun" Released: August 26, 1996; 3. "Vietnow" Released: October 1997 (EU)

Evil Empire is the second studio album by the American rock band Rage Against the Machine, released on April 16, 1996, by Epic Records. It debuted at number 1 on the US Billboard 200 chart with first-week sales of 249,000 copies, and the song "Tire Me" won a 1996 Grammy Award for Best Metal Performance; "Bulls on Parade" and "People of the Sun" were nominated for Grammys for Best Hard Rock Performance. On May 24, 2000, the album was certified triple platinum by the Recording Industry Association of America.

The album's title is a reference to a term used in the early 1980s by President Ronald Reagan and many American conservatives to describe the Soviet Union.

== Background ==
According to MTV News, 'Evil Empire' is taken from Ronald Reagan's epithet of the Soviet Union, which the band feels could just as easily apply to the United States:

The title actually came from a speech by Ronald Reagan in the 1980s, and he addressed the Soviet Union as the "evil empire". If you look at the atrocities committed by the U.S. in the latter half of the 20th century, we feel that tag could be easily used to describe the U.S.

— Zack de la Rocha

Before the May 27, 1996, performance of "Without a Face" that is featured on the band's 1998 Live & Rare album, Zack de la Rocha said: "It seems as if soon as the... the wall in Germany fell, that the US government was busy building another one on the border between the US and Mexico. Since 1986, as a result of a lot of the hate talk and hysteria that the government of the United States has been speaking, 1,500 bodies have been found on the border. We wrote this song in response to it."

"Year of tha Boomerang" had previously been included in the film Higher Learning, though its title was written as "Year of the Boomerang" on the packaging of the film's soundtrack, as well as that of the song's promotional single.

== Packaging ==
The image of the second record was a little more ironic, you know? Considering if you look very closely at the boy's face, he symbolizes the power structure in the U.S.—and if you look at him, he's smiling as if he's in control—but if you look deeper into his face, you see that he's afraid, because he knows what's coming. He knows that poor people in the U.S. are not going to suffer in the way that they are suffering without taking action.

— Zack de la Rocha

The cover of the album features an altered version of a painting of the 1940s–1950s comic book hero Crimebuster done by Mel Ramos, with the emblem on the boy's costume changed from a "c" to a lowercase "e", the caption "Crime Buster" changed to the album's title, and the color of the star in the background changed. The boy on the cover was author and businessman Ari Meisel when he was 11 years old. Meisel told Kerrang! that the original painting was a birthday present from Ramos. Additional artwork for the album was created by Barbara Kruger, some of which appears in the video for "Bulls on Parade".

The album's CD booklet includes a picture of a pile of various political and philosophical books, which include:

- A People's History of the United States by Howard Zinn
- Capital, Volume I by Karl Marx
- A Portrait of the Artist as a Young Man by James Joyce
- The Anarchist Cookbook by William Powell
- Guerrilla Warfare by Che Guevara
- Revolutionary Suicide by Huey P. Newton
- Soul on Ice by Eldridge Cleaver
- The Wretched of the Earth by Frantz Fanon
- Darkness at Noon by Arthur Koestler
- Manufacturing Consent: The Political Economy of the Mass Media by Edward S. Herman and Noam Chomsky
- Live from Death Row by Mumia Abu-Jamal
- Johnny Got His Gun by Dalton Trumbo
- Now and After: The ABC of Communist Anarchism by Alexander Berkman
- The Grapes of Wrath by John Steinbeck
- Rules for Radicals by Saul D. Alinsky
- Soledad Brother: The Prison Letters of George Jackson by George Jackson
- Walden and Resistance to Civil Government by Henry David Thoreau
- Invisible Man by Ralph Ellison
- Another Country by James Baldwin

== Promotion ==
In 1995, the band sent a free 7″ record to everyone who signed up for the fan club promoted in the liner notes of their debut. Doubling as an apology to those who had received nothing and a promotion for the upcoming album, it came in a plain cardboard-colored fold-out with a black-and-white American flag on the cover alongside the band's name and "Evil Empire" in capital letters. On the back cover was a UPC with marker scribble on the barcode. The A-side was a reissue of the Evening Session-version of "Bombtrack" first broadcast on June 7, 1993 (listed as "Bombtrack (Live on the BBC)"), and the B-side was a then-unreleased cover of N.W.A's "Fuck tha Police" that was recorded live on August 13, 1995, at a benefit concert for Mumia Abu-Jamal at the Capitol Ballroom in Washington, D.C.

== Reception and legacy ==
Professional ratings
Review scores
Source	Rating
AllMusic	4/5 stars
Chicago Tribune	3/4 stars
Entertainment Weekly	A−
Houston Chronicle	4/5 stars
Los Angeles Times	3.5/4 stars
NME	5/10
Pitchfork	6.1/10
Rolling Stone	3/5 stars
Spin	8/10
The Village Voice	A−

Rolling Stone affirmed that "this music isn't supposed to be fun," and continued: "Rage Against the Machine have jacked up the sociopolitical siege mentality in their metallic hip-hop to such a dogmatic degree – and honed their sound to such maniacally shrill perfection – that the band and the roaring joys of its harangue 'n' roll seem virtually sexless." AllMusic reviewer Stephen Thomas Erlewine was less impressed, citing the band as "lacking the dexterity to fully execute their metal/hip-hop fusion," and concludes that "Evil Empire succeeds only on the level of a sonic assault." Walter Schreifels, frontman and guitarist of Quicksand, included the album on his list of the ten best in the post-hardcore genre. He adds it exposed a more general audience to hardcore, who were unaware of such, more so than the band's self-titled debut album, which is more rooted in rock and hip-hop. Andrew Flory and John Covach, in their book What's That Sound?: An Introduction to Rock and Its History declared the album is what cemented the band as "an important force in the rap-rock style.

In 2024, Loudwire staff elected it as the best hard rock album of 1996.

In 2026, Evil Empire was ranked No. 6 on Consequence's list of the top 60 albums of 1996.

== Track listing ==
All lyrics are written by Zack de la Rocha; all music is composed by Rage Against the Machine.

No.	Title	Length
1.	"People of the Sun"	2:30
2.	"Bulls on Parade"	3:49
3.	"Vietnow"	4:39
4.	"Revolver"	5:30
5.	"Snakecharmer"	3:56
6.	"Tire Me"	3:00
7.	"Down Rodeo"	5:20
8.	"Without a Face"	3:36
9.	"Wind Below"	5:50
10.	"Roll Right"	4:22
11.	"Year of tha Boomerang"	4:02
Total length:		46:34

== Personnel ==
Rage Against the Machine

- Zack de la Rocha – vocals
- Tom Morello – guitars
- Tim Bob – bass
- Brad Wilk – drums

Technical

- Brendan O'Brien – production
- Rage Against the Machine – co-production
- Andy Wallace – mixing
- Nick DiDia – engineering, recording
- Caram Costanzo – engineering
- Clay Harper – assistant engineering
- Dave Rat – recording ("Down Rodeo" vocals)
- Paul Kosky – recording ("Down Rodeo" vocals)
- Bob Ludwig – mastering

Artwork and design

- Rage Against the Machine – art direction
- Aimée Macauley – art direction
- Lisa Johnson – photography

=== Recording locations ===
- Cole Rehearsal Studios, Los Angeles, CA – recording
- Kiss Music Recording Studios, Melbourne – recording ("Down Rodeo" vocals)
- The Enterprise – mixing
- Gateway Mastering Studios – mastering

== Charts ==
=== Weekly charts ===
Weekly chart performance for Evil Empire
Chart (1996)	Peak position
Australian Albums (ARIA)	2
Austrian Albums (Ö3 Austria)	2
Belgian Albums (Ultratop Flanders)	6
Belgian Albums (Ultratop Wallonia)	2
Danish Albums (Hitlisten)	4
Dutch Albums (Album Top 100)	4
Finnish Albums (Suomen virallinen lista)	5
French Albums (SNEP)	26
German Albums (Offizielle Top 100)	2
Hungarian Albums (MAHASZ)	37
New Zealand Albums (RMNZ)	3
Norwegian Albums (VG-lista)	2
Scottish Albums (Official Charts)	10
Spanish Albums (AFYVE)	10
Swedish Albums (Sverigetopplistan)	1
Swiss Albums (Schweizer Hitparade)	4
UK Albums (Official Charts)	4
UK Rock & Metal Albums (Official Charts)	1
US Billboard 200	1

=== Year-end charts ===
Year-end chart performance for Evil Empire
Chart (1996)	Position
German Albums (Offizielle Top 100)	41

== Certifications ==
Certifications for Evil Empire
Region	Certification	Certified units/sales
Australia (ARIA)	Gold	35,000^{^}
Austria (IFPI Austria)	Gold	25,000^{*}
Belgium (BRMA)	Gold	25,000^{*}
Canada (Music Canada)	Platinum	100,000^{^}
France (SNEP)	Gold	100,000^{*}
New Zealand (RMNZ)	Gold	7,500^{^}
Spain (Promusicae)	Gold	50,000^{^}
Sweden (GLF)	Gold	50,000^{^}
Switzerland (IFPI Switzerland)	Gold	25,000^{^}
United Kingdom (BPI)	Gold	100,000^{^}
United States (RIAA)	3× Platinum	3,000,000^{^}
^{*} Sales figures based on certification alone.^{^} Shipments figures based on certification alone.

== Awards ==
- 1997 Grammy Award – Best Metal Performance for "Tire Me"

== See also ==
- Ronald Reagan in music
