= Ask of You =

Single by Raphael Saadiq

from the album Higher Learning (soundtrack)
- Released: 1995
- Recorded: 1994
- Genre: R&B
- Length: 6:02
- Label: 550 Music, Epic
- Songwriters: Takao El, Hachidai Nakamura, Clemon Timothy Riley, Raphael Saadiq
- Producer: Raphael Saadiq

Raphael Saadiq singles chronology
"Ask of You" (1995)	"Get Involved" (1999)

"Ask of You" is a song by American singer Raphael Saadiq, released as a single from the Higher Learning soundtrack. It was Saadiq's biggest solo hit, peaking at number 19 on the Billboard Hot 100 and number 2 on the U.S. Billboard Hot R&B/Hip-Hop Songs chart.

== Legacy ==
In 1995, the song was sampled in the song "Fat Joe's in Town" on Fat Joe's album Jealous One's Envy.

In 2000, the song was sampled in the song "Lucy Pearl's Way" on Lucy Pearl's self-titled album. The song was co-written and co-produced by Raphael Saadiq.

In 2005, R&B singer Mashonda covered the song for her debut album January Joy.

In 2019, the song was sampled in the song "On Chill" by American rapper Wale featuring American R&B singer Jeremih from the album Wow... That's Crazy.

== Weekly charts ==
Chart (1995)	Peak position
US Billboard Hot 100	19
US Hot R&B/Hip-Hop Songs (Billboard)	2
