= Wakrat =

American rock band

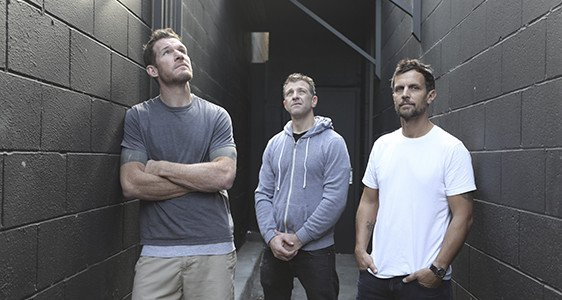
- Left to right: Tim Commerford, Mathias Wakrat and Laurent Grangeon (2016)

Background information
- Origin: Los Angeles, California, U.S.
- Genres: Alternative rock; punk rock; hard rock
- Years active: 2015–present
- Label: Earache
- Members: Tim Commerford; Mathias Wakrat; Laurent Grangeon

Wakrat is an American trio composed of Tim Commerford, Mathias Wakrat and Laurent Grangeon. The heavily alt-punk-influenced group released their self-titled debut album in 2016.

== History ==
Tim Commerford met drummer Mathias Wakrat through his Rage Against the Machine bandmate Zack de la Rocha. "We both share the same enthusiasm for riding mountain bikes," says Commerford. "We'd talk for many hours about mountain biking, and one day he was like, 'Oh yeah, I play drums.'" Grangeon and Wakrat met through a mutual friend. With the addition of guitarist, Laurent Grangeon, the punk-and-hardcore-influenced band was formed, and have completed their debut album.

"I am enjoying myself right now on a musical level more than I've enjoyed myself in my entire career ... it's a beautiful thing," says Commerford.

The band played their first show at the Viper Room in Los Angeles on September 14, 2015. Rage Against the Machine bandmates, Tom Morello, de la Rocha, as well as Audioslave bandmate Chris Cornell, came to support Commerford. One month later, they opened for Royal Blood at The Observatory in Santa Ana, California.

The group released their first single, "Knucklehead", on September 27, 2015. The intense track features Commerford screaming, "Gimmie the gun/Fuck the knife/I'm alright". "I've been dealing with some very deep, dark family stuff that left me in tears," says Commerford about the song. "I spent a lot of time crying in the last year and feeling trapped and alone. That's what 'Knucklehead' is about. Sometimes the dark spawns incredible things, and the music came from that. I went through some deep shit that I hope I never go through again, but look what came from it: this incredible opportunity in music that i love. The scream at the end of the song makes me feel like I'm just putting my face in a pillow and screaming my guts out."

They also released the song "Generation Fucked" on SoundCloud and made a lyric video. The band came to play in London and protested in the streets.

In 2016 the group opened for Prophets of Rage, of which Commerford is also a member of, on their North American "Make America Rage Again Tour".

Commerford spoke of the upcoming debut album, saying, "We are gearing up to be on the offensive, assaulting the populous [sic] with our debut album on Earache Records. We have put a shit load of blood and sweat into this and we want it back! Our mission is to attack modern music and smash the grid. Unapologetic, unrelenting, unbridled and uncensored. Understood?". They released their self-titled debut album on November 8, 2016.

== Members ==
- Tim Commerford – vocals, bass
- Mathias Wakrat – drums, percussion
- Laurent Grangeon – guitar, vocals

== Discography ==
=== Studio albums ===
- Wakrat (2016)
