= Future User =

American rock band

- Origin: Los Angeles, California, U.S.
- Genres: Electronic rock, progressive rock, alternative rock
- Years active: 2013–present
- Label: Middle Ring Partnership
- Members: Tim Commerford; Jordan Tarlow; Jon Knox
- Website: future-user.com

Future User are an American rock band from Los Angeles, California, formed in 2013, consisting of bassist/vocalist Tim Commerford (Rage Against the Machine/Audioslave), drummer Jon Knox (White Heart/Full on the Mouth/Adam Again), and keyboardist/programmer Jordan Tarlow (The Fuzztones). They describe their music as "Progtronic", combining electronic music with progressive rock. They have released one album, SteroidsOrHeroin, in 2015.

== Background ==
Tim Commerford formed Future User along with Jordan Tarlow, a multi-instrumentalist who plays keyboards and does the programming of the music. The tandem teamed up with Commerford's lifelong friend, session drummer Jon Knox and Rage Against the Machine/Audioslave producer Brendan O'Brien who played guitars on the album.

On September 1, 2014, the band released their first video "Clockwork" where Commerford, disguised as the persona 'S.W.I.M.' subjects former tennis star John McEnroe to waterboarding. Comic book writer, editor and publisher Stan Lee makes a brief cameo in their second video, "Supernatural". "Mountain Lion" features cyclist Lance Armstrong as well as a voice message from Armstrong challenging Commerford to a personal cycling contest. Commerford also performs a blood transfusion and injects a PED in the video. When he reveals himself in the final part of the video, he lights himself on fire.

Their debut album, SteroidsOrHeroin, was released through the iTunes Store on February 24, 2015 and was mixed by LA Engineer Tom Syrowski.

To celebrate Record Store Day on April 18, 2015, the band released a limited edition 12-inch vinyl version of the album. Commerford used his own blood to help color the 180-gram red-colored vinyl. There is also a limited edition clear vinyl version of the disc available.

The video for "Voodoo Juju", which was inspired by a real-life accident of Commerford's, shows him undergoing spinal surgery, with good friend and bandmate Tom Morello playing a greedy doctor and Rush members Geddy Lee and Alex Lifeson featured as Canadian doctors. The video contrasts the for-profit American healthcare system with the universal Canadian healthcare system.

== Band members ==
- Tim Commerford – lead vocals, bass guitar (2013–present)
- Jordan Tarlow – keyboards, programming (2013–present)
- Jon Knox – drums (2013–present)

Studio

- Brendan O'Brien – guitar (2014)

== Discography ==
- SteroidsOrHeroin (2015)
