= Stacey Koon =

American criminal and former police officer (born 1950)

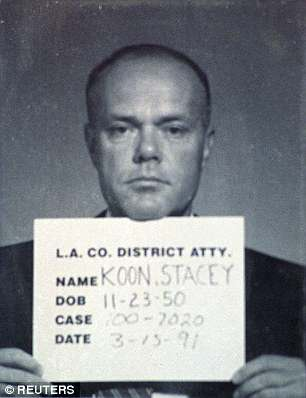
- Koon's mugshot in 1991
- Born: Stacey Cornell Koon; November 23, 1950 (age 75); Lynwood, California, U.S.
- Spouse(s): Mary Koon
- Police career
- Country: United States
- Department: Los Angeles Police Department
- Service years: United States Air Force: 1971–1974; Los Angeles Police Department: 1976–1992
- Rank: Sworn in as an Officer: 1976; Police officer 3: 1978; Sergeant I: 1982
- Awards: LAPD Medal of Valor; 100+ commendations
- Other work: Convicted in connection to the Rodney King beating
- Conviction: Deprivation of rights under color of law (18 U.S.C. § 242)
- Penalty: 2.5 years imprisonment

Stacey Cornell Koon (born November 23, 1950) is an American former policeman with the Los Angeles Police Department. He is one of the four policemen who were responsible for beating Rodney King in March 1991, and the commanding officer at the scene. The trial for the beating and its aftermath would later precipitate into the 1992 Los Angeles riots. Koon was sentenced to 2 1/2 years in federal prison in 1993 for his role in the beating.

== Early life and education ==
Koon has a bachelor's degree and a master's degree in criminal justice from California State University, Los Angeles, and a master's degree in public administration from the University of Southern California.

== Career ==
=== Rodney King beating ===
On March 3, 1991, in Los Angeles, a high-speed chase was initiated by California Highway Patrol officer Melanie Singer after motorist Rodney King was observed driving a 1988 white Hyundai automobile 100 miles per hour (160 km/h). The chase ended on the right shoulder of Foothill Boulevard. Koon, the commanding Los Angeles Police Department officer on the scene, and four other LAPD officers (Laurence Powell, Timothy Wind, Theodore Briseño and Rolando Solano) attempted to arrest King. The officers stated that King resisted arrest and Officers Powell, Wind and Briseño had to use force to subdue him, although witnesses denied that King resisted. The incident was videotaped by a nearby resident, George Holliday, who sold it to local TV station KTLA, with the videotape showing King on all fours on the ground while the officers, taking turns tasering and beating King with their batons.

As a result of the incident, King was hospitalized with a fractured skull, broken leg, and burn marks from the taser. The station aired parts of the video and CNN aired it the next day. The trial was moved out of Los Angeles to the largely white suburb of Simi Valley, after the judge ruled that untainted jurors could not be found in Los Angeles. The police officers were tried for assault and the use of excessive force in state court in 1992. Three of them were acquitted on April 29 that year, while the jury failed to agree on a verdict for the fourth. Later the same day the 1992 Los Angeles riots began, which resulted in 63 deaths.

In 1993, the four policemen were tried in a federal court in Los Angeles; Koon and Powell were convicted of violating King's civil rights. The United States Federal Sentencing Guidelines recommended the offenders serve up to ten years in prison. Instead, U.S. District Judge John Davies sentenced the offenders to 30 months. The sentencing was vacated by the United States Court of Appeals for the Ninth Circuit in August 1994 for violating the guidelines. In February 1996, that judgment was itself reversed by the Supreme Court of the United States, which found that the shortened sentences were within the district court's discretion.

Koon wrote a book in 1992 about the incident, entitled Presumed Guilty: The Tragedy of the Rodney King Affair in which he defended his actions and blamed the riots on the media and community leaders. He appeared as a guest on A Closer Look with Faith Daniels on October 24, 1992.

== Personal life ==
=== Murder attempt ===
In November 1995, a gunman, 35-year-old Randall Tolbert, entered a halfway house where Koon was completing the final weeks of his prison sentence and demanded to know where Koon was. Koon was away from the facility, on a holiday pass at the time. The gunman took three hostages, one of whom was 67-year-old Karl Milam. After fatally shooting Milam, Tolbert was shot and killed by the sheriff's SWAT team during a shootout.

=== After prison ===
Koon eventually moved to Castaic, north of Los Angeles. In 2012, he began working as a chauffeur in Los Angeles for the limousine company Music Express where his patrons have included former U.S. vice president Al Gore and political commentator D. L. Hughley as well as other prominent Hollywood writers.

In 2007, Time magazine profiled Koon as it marked the 15th anniversary of the riots. They reported that since his release he had been living on the royalties from his book.

In 2018, Koon was arrested for driving under the influence in Santa Clarita, California. He pleaded no contest and received a sentence of three years' probation and was required to install an alcohol interlock on his vehicle.

=== In popular culture ===
Both Koon and fellow LAPD officer Laurence Powell have been used as symbols of racism in hip hop and related music. He is referenced by rap metal band Rage Against the Machine in their song "Vietnow," and is mentioned in Ice Cube's songs "Really Doe" and "We Had to Tear This Motherfucka Up". Koon was also namechecked in The Simpsons episode "Sideshow Bob Roberts" by conservative commentator Birch Barlow as an example of someone "railroaded by our liberal justice system" alongside Sideshow Bob, Oliver North, and Joe Camel. He was parodied twice in 1993 by Jim Carrey on the American sketch comedy television series In Living Color.
