= January Joy =

Studio album by Mashonda
- Released: September 13, 2005
- Recorded: 2002–2005
- Studio: Sound on Sound (New York, NY); 36 Chambers Studios (New York, NY); Monza Studios (New York, NY); Sony Studios (New York, NY); The Hit Factory (New York, NY); Unsung Studios (Sherman Oaks, CA); Powerhouse Studios (Yonkers, NY); Doppler Studios (Atlanta, GA); Blakeslee Recording Co. (North Hollywood, CA)
- Genre: R&B; hip hop
- Length: 58:34
- Label: Full Surface; J
- Producer: Brian "All Day" Miller; Bryan-Michael Cox; DJ Scratch; Gerald Flowers; Harvey Allbangers; Jason Rome; Mike City; Mr. Devine; Neo Da Matrix; Raphael Saadiq; Reggie Flowers; Swizz Beatz; The Buchanans; Victor Flowers

Singles from January Joy
- 1. "Used To" Released: July 13, 2004; 2. "Back of da Club" Released: February 22, 2005; 3. "Blackout" Released: June 28, 2005

January Joy is the debut studio album by American singer Mashonda. It was released on September 13, 2005 through Full Surface/J Records in Japan, Hong Kong and United States.

The recording sessions took place at Sound on Sound Studios, 36 Chambers Studios, Monza Studios, Sony Studios, The Hit Factory in New York City, at Unsung Studios in Sherman Oaks, at Powerhouse Studios in Yonkers, at Doppler Studios in Atlanta, and at Blakeslee Recording Co. in North Hollywood.

Production was handled by Swizz Beatz, who also served as executive producer, DJ Scratch, Neo Da Matrix, Brian "All Day" Miller, Bryan-Michael Cox, Gerald Flowers, Harvey Allbangers, Jason Rome, Mike City, Mr. Devine, Raphael Saadiq, Reggie Flowers, The Buchanans and Victor Flowers, with co-producers Sean Garrett and Bryce Wilson.

It features guest appearances from Jadakiss, Kanye West, Raphael Saadiq, Snoop Dogg and Nas.

== Promotion ==
The album was supported with three singles — "Used To", "Back of da Club" and "Blackout", however the album and its singles were met with commercial failure. "Back of da Club" and "Blackout" made it to the US Hot R&B/Hip-Hop Songs chart, reaching No. 86 and 96, respectively.

== Critical reception ==
Professional ratings
Review scores
Source	Rating
Vibe	3.5/5 stars

Vibe editor Dimitri Ehrlich wrote about January Joy: "Sexiness [...] pervades her debut, from standout production to her near-orgasmic delivery [...] The album has its delicate moments, too [...] And while Mashonda may not shatter any glasses, she sings like a woman who’s comfortable in her skin."

== Track listing ==
No.	Title	Writer(s)	Producer(s)	Length
1.	"Step into My World"	Mashonda Tifrere; Qaadir Atkinson	Neo Da Matrix	1:13
2.	"The World Is Ours"	Tifrere; James B. Marshall; William Hutchison	Harvey Allbangers	3:38
3.	"Blackout" (featuring Snoop Dogg)	Tifrere; Calvin Broadus; Kasseem Dean; Sean Garrett	Swizz Beatz; Sean Garrett (co.)	3:20
4.	"Used To"	Tifrere; George Spivey; Raeford Gerald	DJ Scratch	3:57
5.	"Back of da Club"	Tifrere; Dean	Swizz Beatz	3:38
6.	"It's OK"	Andre Gonzalez; Makeda Davis; Simon Johnson; Bryce Wilson	The Buchanans; Bryce Wilson (co.)	3:31
7.	"Hold Me" (featuring Kanye West)	Tifrere; Kanye West; Brian Miller; Gene Allan; Gary Knight	Brian "All Day" Miller	4:03
8.	"Leave the Block Alone" (featuring Jadakiss)	Jason Phillips; Michael Flowers	Mike City	4:16
9.	"Lonely"	Tifrere; Loren Lunnon; Ernest Isley; Marvin Isley; O'Kelly Isley; Ronald Isley; Rudolph Isley; Christopher Jasper	Mr. Devine	3:42
10.	"Girlfriend"	Tifrere; Dean	Swizz Beatz	4:20
11.	"Touch Me"	Chuck Jackson; Marvin Yancy	Gerald Flowers; Victor Flowers; Reggie Flowers	4:31
12.	"Why I Love You"	Tifrere; Bryan-Michael Cox; Jason Rome; Terron Mitchell; Eddie Brigati; Felix Cavaliere	Bryan-Michael Cox; Jason Rome	4:17
13.	"Ask of You" (featuring Raphael Saadiq)	Charles Ray Wiggins; El Takao; Tim Riley; Hachidai Nakamura	Raphael Saadiq	4:22
14.	"No One Else"	Tifrere; Spivey	DJ Scratch	4:49
15.	"Thank You (Outro)"	Tifrere; Atkinson	Neo Da Matrix	1:37

Bonus Track
No.	Title	Writer(s)	Producer(s)	Length
16.	"Blackout" (featuring Nas)	Tifrere; Nasir Jones; Dean; Garrett	Swizz Beatz; Sean Garrett (co.)	3:20
Total length:				58:34

Sample credits

- Track 2 contains a sample from "Out There" written and performed by Willie Hutch
- Track 4 contains a sample from "Friends or Lovers" written by Raeford Gerald as performed by Act 1
- Track 7 contains a sample from "I Can't Believe (Someone Like You Could Really Love Me)" written by Gene Allan and Gary Knight as performed by Sarah Dash
- Track 9 contains a sample from "The Highways of My Life" written by Ernest Isley, Marvin Isley, O'Kelly Isley, Ronald Isley, Rudolph Isley and Christopher Jasper as performed by The Isley Brothers
- Track 12 contains a sample from "Groovin'" written by Edward Brigati and Felix Cavaliere as performed by Willie Mitchell
