= On Chill =

2019 single by Wale featuring Jeremih

Single by Wale featuring Jeremih

from the album Wow... That's Crazy
- Released: July 12, 2019
- Genre: Hip hop R&B
- Length: 3:34
- Label: Warner
- Songwriters: Olubowale Akintimehin; Jeremy Felton; Eric Bellinger
- Producers: Todd Moore; Norva "VA" Denton

Wale singles chronology
"Gemini (2 Sides)" (2019)	"On Chill" (2019)	"BGM" (2019)

Jeremih singles chronology
"You Stay" (2019)	"On Chill" (2019)	"Chase the Summer" (2019)

Music video
- "On Chill" on YouTube

"On Chill" is a song by American rapper Wale featuring Jeremih, released by Warner Records as the lead single from Wale's sixth studio album Wow... That's Crazy on July 12, 2019. Co-written by both performers alongside Eric Bellinger and co-produced by Todd Moore and Norva Denton, the song peaked at number 22 on the US Billboard Hot 100.

== Background ==
The song samples the keyboards from Raphael Saadiq's 1995 song "Ask of You", which was said to give it an "old-school R&B feel".

== Critical reception ==
Writing for Billboard, Heran Mamo called the track "a stalled apology and a plea to simmer things down verbally while heating things up physically". Emily Zemler of Rolling Stone described the song as "slick" and "sultry". Alexis Reese of Vibe wrote that "Jeremih takes over the chorus and bridge, melodically singing sweet nothings about tragedy, reconciling, and being 'on chill'" and felt that "Wale successfully amplifies his established R&B-rap vibes".

== Commercial performance ==
On Chill peaked at number 22 on the US Billboard Hot 100, becoming his highest charting single since "Bad" in 2013 and second highest of his career. On September 22, 2020, the single was certified double platinum by the Recording Industry Association of America (RIAA) for combined sales and streaming equivalent units of over two million units in the United States.

== Charts ==
=== Weekly charts ===
Chart (2019)	Peak position
US Billboard Hot 100	22
US Hot R&B/Hip-Hop Songs (Billboard)	11
US Rhythmic Airplay (Billboard)	1
US Rolling Stone Top 100	34

=== Year-end charts ===
Chart (2019)	Position
US Hot R&B/Hip-Hop Songs (Billboard)	50
US Rhythmic (Billboard)	49

Chart (2020)	Position
US Hot R&B/Hip-Hop Songs (Billboard)	57
US Rhythmic (Billboard)	37

== Certifications ==
Region	Certification	Certified units/sales
Canada (Music Canada)	Gold	40,000^{‡}
New Zealand (RMNZ)	Platinum	30,000^{‡}
United States (RIAA)	2× Platinum	2,000,000^{‡}
^{‡} Sales+streaming figures based on certification alone.
