= Higher Learning (soundtrack) =

Soundtrack album by Various artists
- Released: January 3, 1995
- Recorded: 1994
- Studios: N House Studieoz; WHK Studios (Culver City, California); Pookie; Ocean Way Recording Studios (Hollywood, California); Curtom Recording Studio (Atlanta, Georgia); Bosstown Recording Studios (Atlanta, Georgia); Polydor Studios (Tokyo, Japan); Nomis Studios (London, England); Idiul Studios (Chicago, Illinois); Unique Recording Studios; Water Studios (Hoboken, New Jersey); The Enterprise
- Genres: Hip hop; R&B; rap metal; alternative rock
- Length: 59:56
- Label: New Deal Music / 550 Music / Epic Soundtrax
- Producers: John Singleton (exec.); Eric Rosse; Brad Wood; Brendan O'Brien; Chase; David Gamson; Liz Phair; Me'Shell NdegéOcello; Organized Noize; Raphael Saadiq; Sir Jinx; Stanley Clarke; Ted Niceley; The Brand New Heavies; Zhané

Singles from Higher Learning
- 1. "Situation: Grimm" Released: December 6, 1994; 2. "Ask of You" Released: March 14, 1995; 3. "Year of tha Boomerang" Released: December 17, 1994

Professional ratings
Review scores
Source	Rating
AllMusic	4/5 stars

Music From The Motion Picture "Higher Learning" is the soundtrack to John Singleton's 1995 film Higher Learning. It was released on January 3, 1995 on Singleton's label New Deal Music through 550 Music/Epic Soundtrax and contained a mixture of different music genres including hip hop, R&B and rock music. The soundtrack did fairly well on the Billboard charts, peaking at #39 on the Billboard 200 and #9 on the Top R&B/Hip-Hop Albums.

Liz Phair was nominated for Grammy Award for Best Female Rock Vocal Performance at the 37th Annual Grammy Awards for her song "Don't Have Time".

All the recordings were initially exclusive to the soundtrack. Two charting singles were included on the soundtrack, Raphael Saadiq's "Ask of You", which peaked at #19 on the Billboard Hot 100 and #2 on the Hot R&B/Hip-Hop Singles & Tracks, and Mista Grimm's "Situation: Grimm", which made it to #97 on the Hot R&B/Hip-Hop Singles & Tracks. The Rage Against the Machine track was later re-recorded for their album Evil Empire.

== Track listing ==
No.	Title	Writer(s)	Producer(s)	Length
1.	"Higher" (performed by Ice Cube)	Ice Cube	Sir Jinx	4:32
2.	"Something to Think About" (performed by Ice Cube)	John Singleton		0:10
3.	"Soul Searchin' (I Wanna Know If It's Mine)" (performed by Me'Shell NdegéOcello)	Me'Shell NdegéOcello	David Gamson; Me'Shell NdegéOcello	6:23
4.	"Situation: Grimm" (performed by Mista Grimm)	Rojai Trawick; Etienne Clark; Craig Steven Kenoly	Chase; Darryl Pierce (ass.)	3:54
5.	"Ask of You" (performed by Raphael Saadiq)	Raphael Saadiq	Raphael Saadiq	6:02
6.	"Losing My Religion" (performed by Tori Amos)	Bill Berry; Peter Buck; Mike Mills; Michael Stipe	Eric Rosse	5:00
7.	"Phobia" (performed by Outkast)	Rico Wade; Ray Murray; Patrick Brown; André Benjamin; Antwan Patton; Ruben Bailey	Organized Noize	5:57
8.	"My New Friend" (performed by Cole Hauser and Michael Rapaport)	Singleton		0:27
9.	"Year of the Boomerang" (performed by Rage Against the Machine)	Rage Against the Machine	Brendan O'Brien; Rage Against the Machine (co.)	4:05
10.	"Higher Learning/Time for Change" (performed by The Brand New Heavies)	Simon Bartholomew; Andrew Levy; N'Dea Davenport; Jan Kincaid	The Brand New Heavies	4:52
11.	"Don't Have Time" (performed by Liz Phair)	Liz Phair	Brad Wood; Liz Phair	3:14
12.	"Butterfly" (performed by Tori Amos)	Tori Amos	Eric Rosse	3:07
13.	"By Your Side" (performed by Zhané)	Zhané	Zhané	4:52
14.	"Eye" (performed by Eve's Plum)	Michael Kotch; Colleen Fitzpatrick	Ted Niceley	3:51
15.	"The Learning Curve" (performed by Stanley Clarke)	Stanley Clarke	Stanley Clarke	3:30
Total length:				59:56

== Charts ==
Chart (1995)	Peak position
US Billboard 200	39
US Top R&B/Hip-Hop Albums (Billboard)	9
