= Songs and Artists That Inspired Fahrenheit 9/11 =

Compilation album
- Released: October 5, 2004
- Length: 64:56
- Label: Warner Bros.

Professional ratings
Review scores
Source	Rating
Allmusic	3/5 stars

Songs and Artists That Inspired Fahrenheit 9/11 is a compilation album that followed up the 2004 documentary film Fahrenheit 9/11 by filmmaker Michael Moore. It is not the original soundtrack.

The track listing was selected by Moore based on the songs and the artists he listened to while creating the documentary. It also features unreleased tracks by Rage Against the Machine members, Zack de la Rocha and The Nightwatchman, a.k.a. Tom Morello.

== Track listing ==
1. "I Am A Patriot" - Little Steven & the Disciples of Soul (3:31)
2. "Chimes of Freedom" (Live) - Bruce Springsteen (5:58)
3. "With God on Our Side" - Bob Dylan (7:08)
4. "We Want It All" - Zack de la Rocha, produced by Trent Reznor (4:08)
5. "Boom!" - System of a Down (2:16)
6. "No One Left" - The Nightwatchman (4:19)
7. "Masters of War" (Live) - Pearl Jam (5:33)
8. "Travelin' Soldier" - Dixie Chicks (5:44)
9. "Fortunate Son" (Live) - John Fogerty (3:15)
10. "Know Your Rights" - The Clash (3:42)
11. "The Revolution Starts Now" - Steve Earle (4:25)
12. "Where Is The Love?" - The Black Eyed Peas feat. Justin Timberlake (3:51)
13. "Good Night, New York" (Live) - Nanci Griffith (4:21)
14. "Hallelujah" - Jeff Buckley (6:53)
