= Farside (band) =

American hardcore punk band (1989–2000)

- Origin: Orange County, California, United States
- Genres: Melodic hardcore, emo
- Years active: 1989–2000
- Label: Revelation
- Past members: Michael "Popeye" Vogelsang; Bob Beshear; Kevin Murphy; Sean Rosenthal; Robert Haworth; Zack de la Rocha; Josh Stanton; Bryan Chu; Brian Balchack

Farside was an American hardcore punk band formed in Orange County, California, United States, in 1989. The group disbanded in 2000.

== History ==
The original members were Michael "Popeye" Vogelsang (vocals, guitar), Robert Haworth (guitar), Josh Stanton (bass) and Robert Beshear (drums). Stanton left the band soon after recording the first demo to join 411, which featured future Farside guitarist/vocalist Kevin Murphy. Zack de la Rocha briefly played second lead guitar in 1990–1991, on their second demo (which was part of the Scrap album). Shortly after, he left to focus on the newly formed Rage Against the Machine. The band recorded the "Keep My Soul Awake" EP, followed by the Rochambeau LP. After "Rochambeau," Haworth left the band to form State of the Nation. Kevin Murphy then joined temporarily to complete the band's 1992–1993 European tour, becoming a full-time member shortly after.

Starting with Rigged, the band made a decision to take its music in a slightly different direction. Rigged was recorded by Jim Monroe, who would go on to produce nearly all of Farside's material. The partnership with Monroe led the band to dedicate the final LP's title to Monroe. The production for Rigged was intended to be louder and thicker than previous Farside material and the songs themselves were more aggressive and less pop-inspired.

During the 1990s, tensions arose within Farside because of indecision to pursue the band as a full-time career and disputes over signing to a major label. Farside's sound was a mixture of late 1980s post-hardcore (Dag Nasty, Hüsker Dü and the Descendents are notable influences), 1990s alternative metal (Helmet, Quicksand, etc.), and the power pop sensibilities of the late 1970s (Elvis Costello); the band never found a consistent style. As a result, it is hard to place in one genre. Farside recorded cover versions for various compilation records, including straightforward interpretations of early emocore band Embrace and New Jersey power metal band TT Quick. A lounge version of the Misfits' "Return of the Fly" and a rare country and western version of "Pretty Vacant" by the Sex Pistols were also recorded.

Toward the end of 1999, Chu left the band to focus on his teaching career. He was replaced by Brian Balchack (guitar player of Orange County's Ignite) for shows surrounding the release of The Monroe Doctrine, but due to Balchack's touring schedule with Ignite he couldn't commit to being in the band full-time. Sean Rosenthal (from Orange County metalcore band Adamantium) joined as bassist to complete the band's final tour in 2000 and played on the Sex Pistols recording. The band officially disbanded shortly after returning home. There are no current plans to reunite or play again.

Vogelsang later briefly joined Orange County rock band The Aquabats as a touring guitarist in 2005, appearing in their music video for "Fashion Zombies!" and their performance on television program Attack of the Show, though he never recorded with the band. He is currently a member of the bands Your Favorite Trainwreck and Calling Hours.

== Influences ==
Farside cited influences including Dag Nasty, the Lemonheads, Hüsker Dü, Buffalo Tom, Descendents, 7 Seconds, the Jam, the Clash, Joe Jackson and Elvis Costello.

== Members ==
Last formation

- Michael "Popeye" Vogelsang – vocals, guitar (1989–2000)
- Bob Beshear – drums (1989–2000)
- Kevin Murphy – guitar, vocals (1993–2000, touring 1992–1993)
- Sean Rosenthal – bass (1999–2000)

Former members

- Robert Haworth – guitar (1989–1992)
- Zack de la Rocha – guitar (1990–1991)
- Josh Stanton – bass (1989–1990)
- Bryan Chu – bass (1990–1999)
- Brian Balchack – bass (touring 1999)

== Discography ==
Farside's first release was the four song EP, Keep My Soul Awake, released on Crisis Records in 1990. The band subsequently released three full-length albums and an EP on Revelation Records beginning with Rochambeau in 1992. The group's second album Rigged was released in 1994. After its self-titled EP in 1995, the band disappeared for a few years before re-emerging in 1999 with their final album, The Monroe Doctrine.

An additional full-length release by the band was called Scrap. This LP, released on Comida Records, is a collection of the band's first two demos, the first recorded in April and the second recorded in December 1990, respectively. Farside recorded several songs for various compilations including covers of Embrace, the Misfits, TT Quick and the Sex Pistols.

Studio albums

- Rochambeau (1992, Revelation Records)
- Rigged (1994, Revelation Records)
- The Monroe Doctrine (1999, Revelation Records)

EPs

- Keep My Soul Awake (1991, Crisis Records)
- Farside (1995, Revelation Records)
- Sense Field / Farside split (1997, Revelation Records)

Compilation albums

- Scrap (1994, Comida Records)

== Appearances in popular culture ==
Farside's song "Seven-Day Constant", from their 1999 album The Monroe Doctrine, is listed on the soundtrack of the 2001 video game Amped: Freestyle Snowboarding.
