= We Want It All =

Single by Zack de la Rocha
- Released: 2004
- Recorded: 2003
- Studio: Nothing (New Orleans)
- Genre: Alternative metal, industrial rock
- Length: 4:08
- Label: Broadcast Music, Inc.
- Producer: Trent Reznor

"We Want It All" is one of only two songs that Rage Against the Machine vocalist Zack de la Rocha released while the band was disbanded. Out of the twenty or so tracks which De La Rocha and Trent Reznor of Nine Inch Nails collaborated on, this is the only track of those sessions which has been released. Produced by Reznor and recorded at Nothing Studio in New Orleans in 2003, "We Want It All" appears on the 2004 compilation album Songs and Artists that Inspired Fahrenheit 9/11.

== Critical reception ==
CraveOnline stated: "The vocal track was true to Zack’s lyrical form, while the instrumentation had the drum-and-bass feel of Nine Inch Nails’ 'The Perfect Drug'."

== Personnel ==
- Zack de la Rocha - vocals
- Steve Marcussen - mastering
- David Bianco - mixing
- Trent Reznor - production
