= Jon Knox =

American session drummer

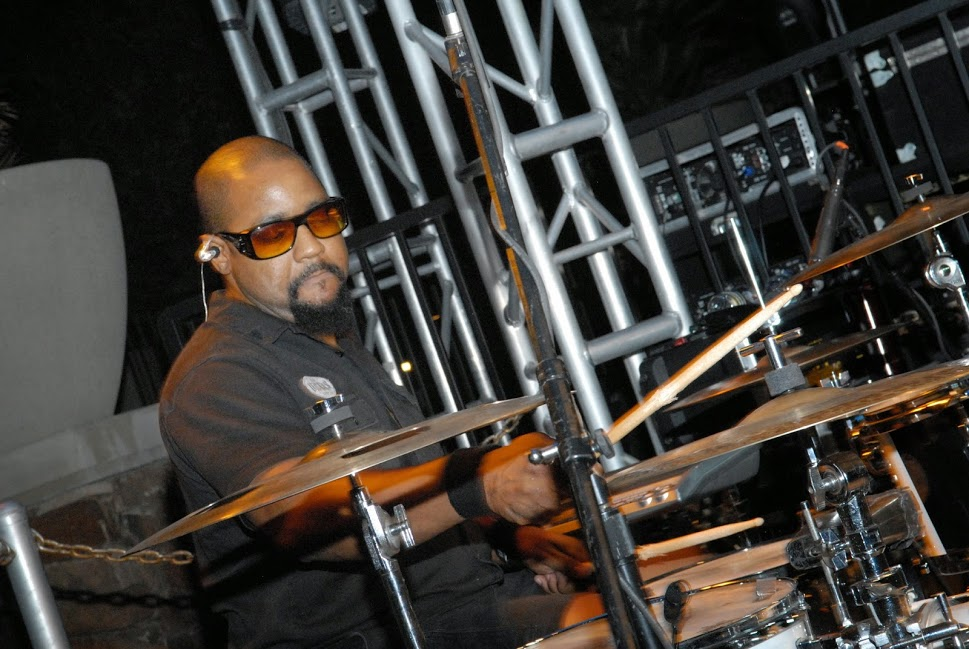
- Knox performing in 2014

Background information
- Born: North Carolina, U.S.
- Genres: Rock, Christian rock
- Occupations: Musician, producer, beatmaker and composer
- Instrument: Drums
- Years active: 1982–present
- Website: jonknoxonline.com

Jon Knox is an American session drummer who has been a member of the bands White Heart, Adam Again, Future User, Full on the Mouth, and was the drummer for The Union of Sinners and Saints. He is also a producer, beatmaker, and composer.

== Background ==
Knox was the drummer of Christian rock band White Heart from 1992 to 1997, and concurrently the drummer of the alternative funk rock band Adam Again. He reunited with White Heart in 2006 for the Soul2Soul Awards show and again in 2014 for the Easterfest concert in Australia.

Knox is now the drummer for The Union of Sinners and Saints. The Union features members from two best-selling Christian Rock bands, White Heart (band) and Petra.

Jon is responsible for helping form Rage Against the Machine and when bassist, Tim Commerford started a side project in 2013, he tapped his longtime friend, Knox to play drums for his electronic progressive rock outfit Future User for their debut release. The band is composed of bassist, Commerford, along with multi-instrumentalist Jordan Tarlow on keys and production and Brendan O'Brien on guitars.

Knox endorses Pearl drums, SoulTone cymbals, Vic Firth sticks, CymPad, Protection Racket, and Bumwrap Drum Company.
