= Wow... That's Crazy =

Studio album by Wale
- Released: October 11, 2019
- Recorded: 2018–2019
- Genre: Hip-hop
- Length: 53:42
- Labels: Every Blue Moon; Maybach; Warner
- Producers: The Arcade; Ayo & Keyz; Bizness Boi; The DropKix; D Woo; Esta; Hit-Boy; J-Bo; Kyle Donald; Lionel Nealy; Mike Hector; Norva "VA" Denton; OB; OTF Rah; OZ; Sango; StreetRunner; Super Miles; Tarik Azzouz; Todd Bergman; Todd Moore

Wale chronology
Shine (2017)	Wow... That's Crazy (2019)	Folarin II (2021)

Singles from Wow... That's Crazy
- 1. "On Chill" Released: July 12, 2019; 2. "BGM" Released: August 26, 2019; 3. "Love & Loyalty" Released: October 1, 2019; 4. "Love... (Her Fault)" Released: January 2020; 5. "Sue Me" Released: April 22, 2020

Professional ratings
Review scores
Source	Rating
HipHopDX	3.2/5

Wow... That's Crazy is the sixth studio album by American rapper Wale. It was released on October 11, 2019, by Every Blue Moon, Maybach Music Group and Warner Records. The production on the album was handled by multiple producers including: Hit-Boy, OZ, Ayo & Keyz, The Arcade and Bizness Boi among others. The album also features guest appearance by Meek Mill, Rick Ross, Bryson Tiller, Ari Lennox, Boogie, 6lack, Lil Durk, and more.

Wow... That's Crazy was supported by five singles: "On Chill", "BGM", "Love & Loyalty", "Love... (Her Fault)" and "Sue Me". The album received generally positive reviews from music critics and was a moderate commercial success. It debuted at number seven on the US Billboard 200 with 38,000 album-equivalent units in its first week. The album was certified gold by the Recording Industry Association of America (RIAA) in November 2021.

== Background ==
In 2018, Wale announced that he parted ways with Atlantic Records, and released three EPs with Warner Records throughout the year: It's Complicated, Self Promotion, and Free Lunch.

In July 2019, a meme circulated on social media claiming that Wale would be naming his upcoming album Painus, a portmanteau of the words "pain" and "famous". Wale was forced to deny the allegations on Twitter, stating "this is fake and y'all [are] way too gullible". The true title of the album was announced in September 2019 with the release of a trailer directed by Jon Alston, starring Tetona Jackson as Wale's therapist.

== Cover art ==
The album's cover art is a reference to the 2018 art intervention Love Is in the Bin by Banksy, when his painting of his mural Girl with Balloon was shredded by means of a self-destruction mechanism immediately after the painting's sale at auction. This is emulated in the cover art for Wow... That's Crazy, which shows the shredding of a portrait of Wale striking the same pose as on the cover art for his 2011 album Ambition. The cover art for Wow... That's Crazy also features a red balloon, a notable element of Banksy's mural Girl with Balloon.

== Singles ==
Wale released "Black Bonnie" and "Poledancer" in 2018 as promotional singles.

The first single from the album, "On Chill" featuring Jeremih, was released on July 12, 2019. On August 26, the second single "BGM" was released. He released the third single on October 1, titled "Loyalty & Love" featuring Mannywellz.

"Love... (Her Fault)", featuring Bryson Tiller was released as a single in January 2020. The album opener "Sue Me", featuring Kelly Price was released as a single in April 2020. "Sue Me" was performed as a medley with "Love... (Her Fault)", alongside Price on The Daily Show with Trevor Noah on February 11, 2020, in which Wale paid tribute to Kobe Bryant and Bryant's daughter Gianna. A video, in the form of a short-film, was released for "Sue Me" on April 22, 2020. Rap-Up described the video as "provocative and powerful", showcasing "an alternate reality where the black and white experience are reversed".

== Commercial performance ==
Wow... That's Crazy debuted at number seven on the US Billboard 200 chart, earning 38,000 album-equivalent units (including 5,000 copies in pure album sales) in its first week. This became Wale's fourth US top-ten debut on the chart. On November 30, 2021, the album was certified gold by the Recording Industry Association of America (RIAA) for combined sales and album-equivalent units of over 500,000 units in the United States.

== Track listing ==
Wow... That's Crazy track listing
No.	Title	Writer(s)	Producer(s)	Length
1.	"Sue Me" (featuring Kelly Price)	Olubowale Akintimehin; Kelly Price; Norva Denton	D Woo; Larrance Dopson^{[a]}; Quintin Gulledge^{[a]}	3:50
2.	"Love & Loyalty" (featuring Mannywellz)	Akintimehin; Emmanuel Ajomale	Sango	3:10
3.	"Cliché" (featuring Ari Lennox and Boogie)	Akintimehin; Anthony Dixson; Joelle James; Philip Adetumbi	OB	3:40
4.	"Expectations" (featuring 6lack)	Akintimehin; Christopher Ward; Ricardo Valentine, Jr.	Bizness Boi; Th3ory^{[b]}	5:03
5.	"BGM"	Akintimehin	Esta	3:07
6.	"Love... (Her Fault)" (featuring Bryson Tiller)	Akintimehin; Bryson Tiller	OZ	3:32
7.	"On Chill" (featuring Jeremih)	Olubowale Akintimehin • Jeremy Felton • Todd Moore • Norva "VA" Denton • Charlie Ray Wiggins	Denton; Todd Moore	3:34
8.	"Routine" (featuring Meek Mill and Rick Ross)	Akintimehin; Clemm Rishad; Robert Williams; William Roberts	StreetRunner	3:34
9.	"Love Me Nina/Semiautomatic"	Akintimehin; Ajomale; Flex Kartel	Ayo & Keyz; Kyle Donald; Super Miles; Todd Bergman	4:16
10.	"Break My Heart (My Fault)" (featuring Lil Durk)	Akintimehin; Durk Banks	OTF Rah; Park Hill^{[a]}; SkylerOnTheBeat^{[a]}	3:53
11.	"Debbie"	Akintimehin	The Arcade	2:25
12.	"50 in da Safe" (featuring Pink Sweats)	Akintimehin; David Bowden	Hit-Boy	4:24
13.	"Set You Free" (featuring Kelly Price)	Akintimehin; Price	Mike Hector	2:48
Total length:				53:42

Bonus tracks
No.	Title	Writer(s)	Producer(s)	Length
14.	"Black Bonnie" (featuring Jacquees)	Akintimehin; Bellinger; Rodriquez Broadnax	Ayo N Keyz	2:57
15.	"Poledancer" (featuring Megan Thee Stallion)	Akintimehin; Megan Pete	Justin DeVon Garner; Lionel Nealy	3:29

Notes

- ^{^[a]} signifies an additional producer
- ^{^[b]} signifies a co-producer

== Charts ==
Chart (2019)	Peak position
Canadian Albums (Billboard)	55
US Billboard 200	7
US Top R&B/Hip-Hop Albums (Billboard)	6

== Certifications ==
Region	Certification	Certified units/sales
United States (RIAA)	Gold	500,000^{‡}
^{‡} Sales+streaming figures based on certification alone.
