= Higher Learning =

1995 film by John Singleton

- Theatrical release poster
- Directed by: John Singleton
- Written by: John Singleton
- Produced by: John Singleton; Paul Hall
- Starring: Jennifer Connelly; Ice Cube; Omar Epps; Michael Rapaport; Kristy Swanson; Laurence Fishburne
- Cinematography: Peter Lyons Collister
- Edited by: Bruce Cannon
- Music by: Stanley Clarke
- Production companies: Columbia Pictures; New Deal Productions
- Distributed by: Sony Pictures Releasing
- Release date: January 11, 1995
- Running time: 127 minutes
- Country: United States
- Language: English
- Box office: $38.3 million

Higher Learning is a 1995 American crime drama film written and directed by John Singleton and starring an ensemble cast. The film follows the changing lives of three incoming freshmen at the fictional Columbus University: Malik Williams (Omar Epps), a track star who struggles with academics; Kristen Connor (Kristy Swanson), a shy and naive girl; and Remy (Michael Rapaport), a lonely and confused man seemingly out of place in his new environment.

The film also featured Tyra Banks's first performance in a theatrical film. Laurence Fishburne won an NAACP Image Award for "Outstanding Supporting Actor in a Motion Picture"; Ice Cube was also nominated for the award. The exterior shots and outdoor scenes were shot on the campus of University of California, Los Angeles (UCLA) while the interiors were shot at Sony Pictures Studios.

== Plot ==
Kristen Connor, a friendly but naïve white woman from Orange County, California, and Malik Williams, a black high-school track star on an athletic scholarship, both incoming freshmen at the fictional Columbus University, attend a dorm party hosted by militant Afrocentric activist Fudge White, who has been attending the university for 6 years. Fudge's roommate Remy, a quiet white man from Boise, Idaho, and fellow freshman who is studying engineering, contacts campus police to disband the party for noise violations. Fudge argues that the police unfairly target black students while conversely ignoring white students.

Taryn, an openly lesbian feminist junior, warns Kristen about walking alone at night on campus and invites her to join her student group. Meanwhile, Malik and Kristen both enroll in a political science class taught by Maurice Phipps, a conservative black man from the British West Indies. Phipps assigns his students a semester-long project of formulating their own political ideologies instead of allowing others to categorize them.

Frat boy Billy McDonald rapes Kristen one night, ignoring her refusal to have sex without a condom. Monet, Kristen's roommate, discovers her crying and receives a racially offensive call from Billy; she then notifies Fudge. At a frat party, Fudge's friends confront and severely assault Billy for the racist remark, and Kristen identifies Billy to the black students, who force him to apologize to Monet, unaware that he sexually assaulted Kristen. Shortly afterwards, Kristen joins Taryn's student group, discloses the rape, and is encouraged by Taryn to report the crime. As they bond, Kristen begins developing romantic feelings for Taryn, but eventually decides to continue a relationship with Wayne, a college student and roommate of Malik she was already dating.

When Fudge threateningly mocks Remy's complaints about his loud music constantly disrupting Remy's studies, Remy moves out and gets a new Jewish roommate named David Isaacs. However, his frustration grows when Malik mocks him after winning a video game. Shortly afterwards, feeling increasingly isolated from his peers, Remy befriends a group of white supremacists led by Scott Moss, who live near the university campus; influenced by their neo-nazi racist beliefs, he eventually joins their ranks as a Nazi skinhead.

Malik confronts Phipps over a dismal grade on a midterm essay and accuses him of selling out to the white establishment. Phipps responsively explains the various spelling and grammar errors and emphasizes the importance of taking personal responsibility, sharing his perspective that black people have to work twice as hard both to triumph over societal prejudice and to attain the same socio-economic status as white people. Afterwards, Malik improves his writing skills, aided by his girlfriend, fellow track athlete Deja, and learns valuable lessons about self-improvement.

Conversely, Remy's hatred and racism escalate as he pulls a gun on Malik and David, using racial slurs. He eventually drops out of the university and, encouraged by his Neo-Nazi friends, fires a sniper rifle from a rooftop during a peace festival organized by Kristen and Monet. Deja is killed in the attack, and a vengeful Malik locates and assaults Remy before the campus police violently restrain and pummel him, ironically overlooking Remy's presence until he pulls a pistol. Remy remorsefully attempts to apologize for his actions before committing suicide by shooting himself in the mouth. Later that night, the skinheads congregate in Moss' apartment, eagerly waiting to hear news from Remy, while confident that nothing will connect him to them. Following a TV news report, the neonazis hail Remy's "heroic" actions, while Moss quietly sits back, satisfied.

After the shooting, Malik expresses discouragement and uncertainty to Phipps about continuing his studies, with Phipps reciprocally expressing trust in Malik's judgment and future choice. Malik and Kristen, who have previously interacted minimally with each other, converse near a converted Christopher Columbus statue, reflecting on the recent events. While Kristen believes the shooting was her fault for organizing the peace festival, Malik reassures her that she is not to blame, and that it was the right thing to do at the time, before departing from the campus, leaving his fate at the university undisclosed. Ultimately, Fudge, Taryn, and others graduate from Columbus University, while Phipps walks beneath the American flag, with the caption "Unlearn" superimposed over it.

== Cast ==
- Omar Epps as Malik Williams
- Kristy Swanson as Kristen Connor
- Michael Rapaport as Remy
- Ice Cube as "Fudge" White
- Jennifer Connelly as Taryn
- Tyra Banks as Deja
- Regina King as Monet
- Jason Wiles as Wayne
- Cole Hauser as Scott Moss
- Busta Rhymes as "Dreads"
- Laurence Fishburne as Professor Maurice Phipps
- Bradford English as Officer Bradley
- Jay R. Ferguson as Billy
- J. Trevor Edmond as Eddie
- Andrew Bryniarski as Knocko
- Trevor St. John as James
- Talbert Morton as Erik
- Adam Goldberg as David Isaacs
- Bridgette Wilson as Nicole
- Kari Wuhrer as Claudia
- Randall Batinkoff as Chad Shadowhill
- Dedrick D. Gobert as Fudge's Homie
- Malcolm Norrington as Cory
- Morris Chestnut as Track Anchor (uncredited)
- Jeanette Bolden as Deja Track Coach (uncredited)

The band Eve's Plum performs, as themselves, at the Peace Fest.

== Reception ==
Higher Learning grossed $38,290,723 in the United States, with $20,200,000 in rentals. It ranked #44 for yearly domestic gross and #17 amongst R-rated films in 1995.

For their performances in Higher Learning, Laurence Fishburne and Ice Cube were nominated for the 1996 Image Award for Outstanding Supporting Actor in a Motion Picture. Fishburne won.

=== Critical response ===
The film received mixed reviews. Roger Ebert commended John Singleton's direction of the film: "He sees with a clear eye and a strong will, and is not persuaded by fashionable ideologies. His movies are thought-provoking because he uses familiar kinds of characters and then asks hard questions about them." He awarded the film three out of four stars. Time Out wrote: "A stylish, intelligent film-maker, Singleton interweaves the threads of his demographic tapestry with assurance, passion and a welcome awareness of the complexities of the college community's contradictory impulses towards integration and separatism." Writing in The New York Times, Janet Maslin felt that the movie fell short of its goal, saying it "turns out to be an inadvertent example of the same small-mindedness it deplores". Reel Film Reviews wrote that the film is "consistently entertaining and well-acted all around. While it's not a perfect movie – Cube's character disappears for a 30-minute stretch and Singleton's approach often veers into heavy-handedness – it is nevertheless an intriguing look at the differences between races and how such differences can clash", and awarded it 3.5 stars out of 4.

Higher Learning holds a 46% rating on Rotten Tomatoes based on 41 reviews, with an average rating of 5.30/10. The site's consensus states; "It's hard to fault Higher Learning's goals; unfortunately, writer-director John Singleton too often struggles to fit his themes within a consistently engaging story." On Metacritic, it has a score of 54% based on review from 20 critics. Singleton commented: "If you look at Higher Learning, which I was 25 years old making it, I'm like chock full of everything that would concern young people: lesbianism, and racism, and everything I could put in that movie. It was a great movie. A fun movie to do. But you could never get that movie made now. Never. The guy shoots everybody, know what I mean?"

== Soundtrack ==
The soundtrack, containing hip hop, R&B, rock and jazz music, was released on January 3, 1995, by John Singleton's New Deal Music label through 550 Music/Epic Soundtrax. It peaked at number 39 on the Billboard 200 and number 9 on the Top R&B/Hip-Hop Albums. In addition to "Higher", performed by Ice Cube, the soundtrack includes original music by OutKast, Liz Phair, Tori Amos and Rage Against the Machine.

== Pop culture ==
The character Malik, played by the same actor, Omar Epps, appears in Don't Be a Menace to South Central While Drinking Your Juice in the Hood, a comedy movie that parodied some popular black movies of the 1990s. A year later, after the graduation of a friend, Malik had returned to the university where he was shot and killed by a new Skinheads member.
