= Tim Commerford =

American bassist

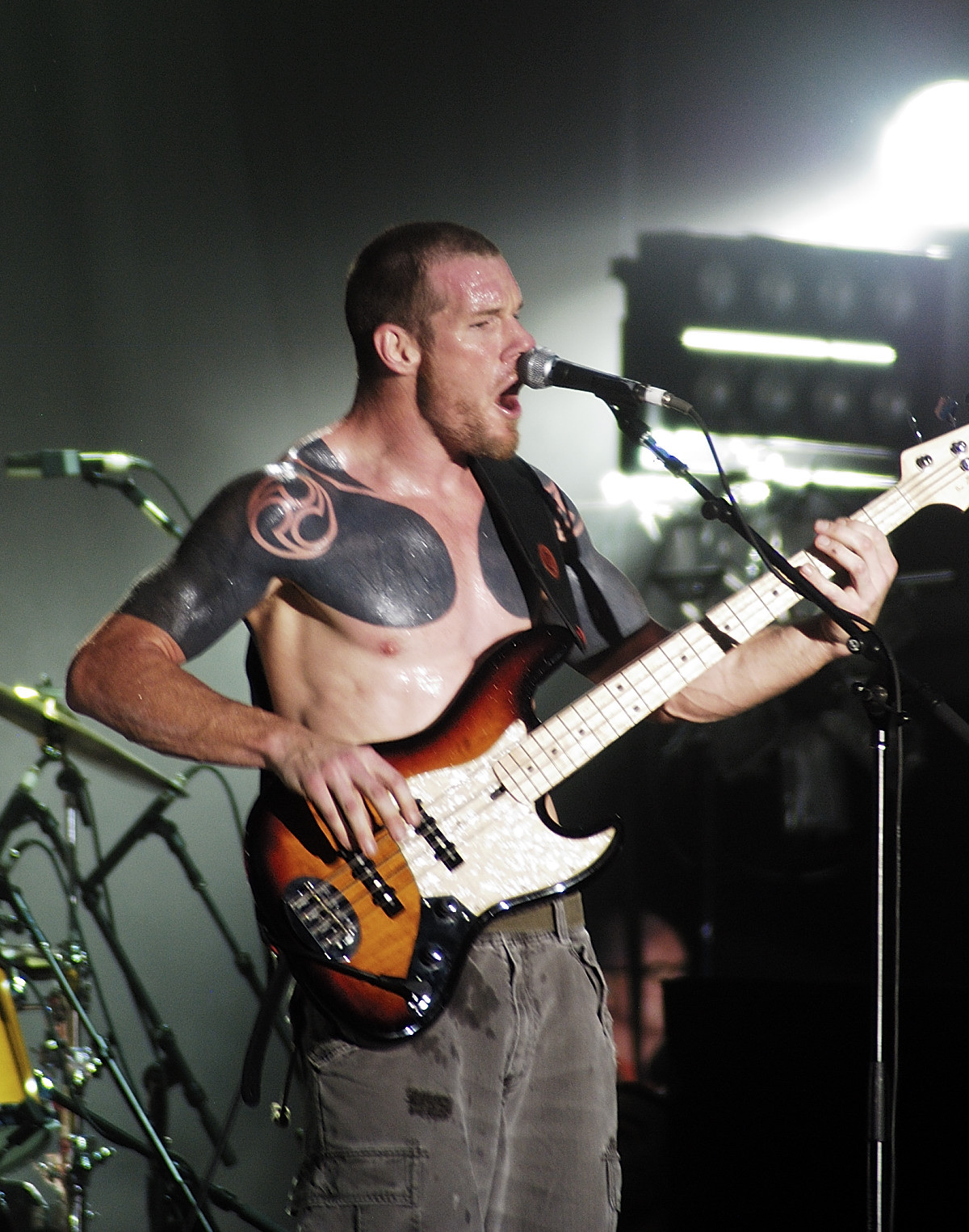
- Commerford in 2008

Background information
- Also known as: Timmy C.; Y.tim.K.; Tim Bob; tim.com; Simmering T.; S.W.I.M.
- Born: Timothy Commerford; February 26, 1968 (age 58); Irvine, California, U.S.
- Genres: Alternative metal; rap metal; funk metal; alternative rock; hard rock
- Occupations: Musician, songwriter, singer
- Instruments: Bass guitar; vocals
- Years active: 1988–present
- Labels: Interscope; Epic
- Member of: Wakrat; Future User; 7D7D
- Formerly of: Rage Against the Machine; Audioslave; Prophets of Rage
- Spouse: Aleece Dimas (m. 2001; div. 2024)
- Website: ratm.com

Timothy Commerford (born February 26, 1968) is an American musician, singer, and songwriter, best known as the bassist and backing vocalist for the rap rock band Rage Against the Machine and the supergroups Audioslave and Prophets of Rage. Since 2013 and 2015, respectively, he has also been the lead singer and bassist of the bands Future User and Wakrat.

He was ranked eighth on Paste magazine's list of "20 Underrated Bass Guitarists" in 2014.

== Early life ==
Commerford was born on February 26, 1968, in Irvine, California. Growing up, he was a fan of Gene Simmons, Sid Vicious, Steve Harris, and Geddy Lee.

== Career ==
=== Rage Against the Machine (1991–2000) ===
In 1991, following the break-up of the band Lock Up featuring guitarist Tom Morello, the band's drummer, Jon Knox, encouraged Commerford and Zack de la Rocha to jam with Tom Morello. Tom soon called drummer Brad Wilk, who had unsuccessfully auditioned for Lock Up. This line-up went on to form Rage Against the Machine. After frequenting the L.A. club circuit, Rage Against the Machine signed a record deal with Epic Records in 1992. That same year, the band released their self-titled debut. They achieved a phenomenal amount of mainstream success and released three more studio albums.

Commerford's appearances on Rage Against the Machine's studio records have been marked with a running joke where his credits on the record were under nicknames, such as "Y Tim K" or "Tim.com".

On September 7, 2000, Commerford climbed atop onstage scaffolding during the MTV Music Video Awards, and disrupted the proceedings when Limp Bizkit won an award. Commerford was arrested that evening, and a disgruntled de la Rocha quit the band soon after.

=== Audioslave (2001–2007) ===
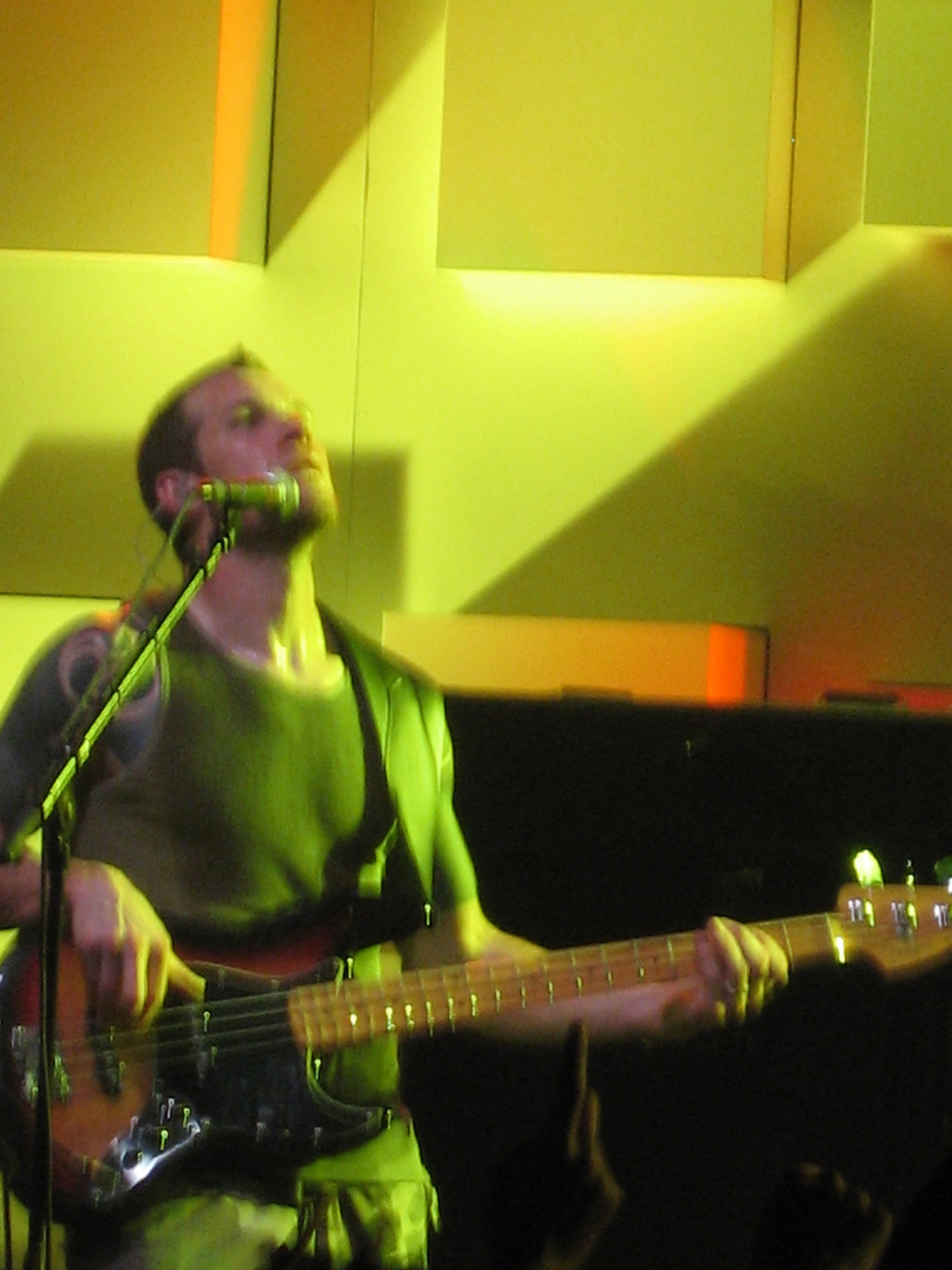
Commerford performing with Audioslave at the Montreux Jazz Festival in 2005

After de la Rocha left Rage Against the Machine, music producer Rick Rubin suggested the three remaining members of Rage get together with then-former Soundgarden singer Chris Cornell, and "see what happens". The newly formed Audioslave later released their eponymous debut album in November 2002, which would attain triple platinum status.

=== Future User, Wakrat and 7D7D (2014–present) ===
Commerford co-founded the band Future User, together with Jordan Tarlow (keys), Jon Knox (drums) and producer Brendan O'Brien (guitars). Commerford plays bass and is the vocalist of the band. Commerford hid several months under the S.W.I.M persona on the first music videos, before unmasking himself in the "Mountain Lion" video. The "Mountain Lion" video featured road racing cyclist Lance Armstrong, a close friend of Commerford, while a skateboarding Commerford appears to inject himself with a steroid.

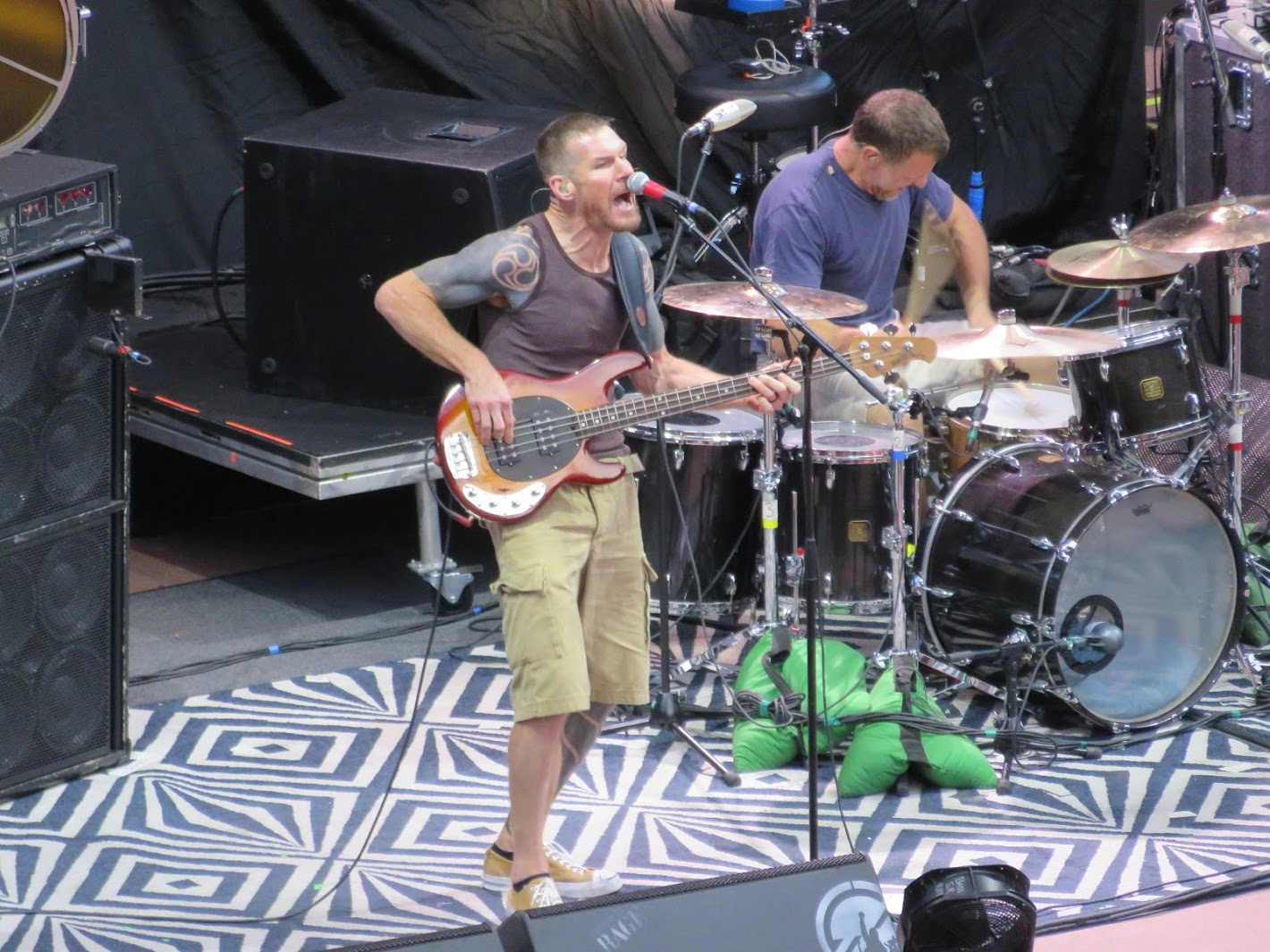
Tim Commerford Performing at Red Rocks in 2016

In 2015, he formed "punk and hardcore-influenced band", named Wakrat. The band also features drummer Mathias Wakrat and guitarist Laurent Grangeon. The band debuted their first single, "Knucklehead", in September 2015.

In 2022, Commerford launched a new project, 7D7D, with Mathias Wakrat and Jonny Polonsky. The group debuted their first single, "Capitalism", in November.

=== Other contributions ===
Commerford and drummer Brad Wilk contributed to Maynard James Keenan's side project Puscifer and his album "V" Is for Vagina on the track "Momma Sed". Both have taken part in the production of Dave Grohl's 2013 Sound City soundtrack, with the track "Time Slowing Down". In 2010, Commerford was interviewed and appeared in the documentary Rush: Beyond the Lighted Stage.

== Personal life ==
In 2001, Commerford married his longtime girlfriend, Aleece Dimas. They have two sons together. In November 2018, the couple announced they were divorcing, finalizing their divorce five years later in 2024.

Commerford is a self-described "conspiracy theorist". In a Rolling Stone interview in 2015, he claimed that the Moon landing was faked and he confronted Buzz Aldrin about it at a John Cusack movie premiere. In the same interview, Commerford also stated that he does not believe ISIS is real and cast doubt upon the ISIS beheading videos:

They're not real. They're high-def. They have a soundtrack. The parts of those videos that you couldn't fake are edited out. At first, I thought it was edited out by our government so our kids wouldn't be seeing it on the Internet, but no. That's the way those videos came. The knife starts to cut the neck, and then it fades out. There's too much stuff that doesn't look real. They've edited out the parts that would be too hard to fake. We created Jihadi John and ISIS so we can go drop bombs.

In December 2022, Commerford revealed he had been diagnosed with prostate cancer earlier in the year, and had undergone surgery prior to going on tour with Rage Against the Machine that summer.

== Artistry ==
=== Technique ===
Commerford plays bass with his fingers and prefers not to use a pick, explaining, "I don't play with a pick at all. Chris Squire is the only pick player that I like. I don't even consider using a pick on the bass as bass playing; that's more like playing guitar on the bass. But (Squire) had that that kind of pick/thumb together that made this just unbelievable sound. Like 'Roundabout,' the bass sound on that is still one of my favorite bass sounds of all time, just the tone of it. But fingers are the only way to fly for me, man."

=== Equipment ===
Commerford has been using various Music Man StingRay basses since 2016, a brand he has liked since his beginnings with Rage Against The Machine. MusicMan released several custom Artist Series basses in 2021 and 2024. He previously used Fender Jazz Basses with Fender Precision Bass necks and Lakland basses.

== Discography ==
Rage Against the Machine

Main article: Rage Against the Machine discography
- Rage Against the Machine (1992)
- Evil Empire (1996)
- Live & Rare (1998)
- The Battle of Los Angeles (1999)
- Renegades (2000)
- Live at the Grand Olympic Auditorium (2003)

Audioslave

Main article: Audioslave discography
- Audioslave (2002)
- Out of Exile (2005)
- Revelations (2006)

Future User

- SteroidsOrHeroin (2015)

Wakrat

- Wakrat (2016)

Prophets of Rage

- Prophets of Rage (2017)
