= Zack de la Rocha =

American musician, lead singer of Rage Against the Machine (b. 1970)

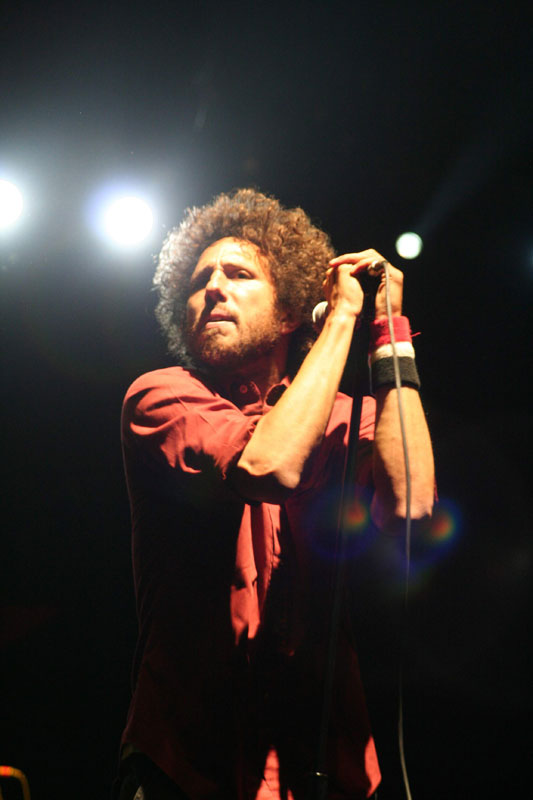
- De la Rocha performing with Rage Against the Machine in April 2007

Background information
- Born: Zacharias Manuel de la Rocha; January 12, 1970 (age 56); Long Beach, California, U.S.
- Genres: Rap metal; alternative metal; funk metal; hardcore punk; youth crew; political hip-hop; rap rock
- Occupations: Musician; rapper; singer; songwriter; activist
- Instruments: Vocals; guitar; drums; keyboards; jarana jarocha
- Years active: 1987–present
- Formerly of: Rage Against the Machine; Hard Stance; No For An Answer; Inside Out; Farside; One Day as a Lion

Zacharias Manuel de la Rocha (born January 12, 1970) is an American musician, rapper, singer, songwriter, and political activist. He is best known as the vocalist and lyricist of the rock band Rage Against the Machine. Through both Rage Against the Machine and his activism, de la Rocha promotes left-wing politics in opposition to corporate America, the military–industrial complex, and government oppression.

== Early life ==
De la Rocha was born in Long Beach, California, on January 12, 1970, to Robert "Beto" de la Rocha and Olivia Lorryne Carter. His father is a Mexican-American, with distant African and Sephardi Jewish heritage, while his mother was born to Manuel García Urias, a Mexican-American, and Olive Pearl Fleming, who was of German and Irish heritage. Beto was a muralist and a member of Los Four, the first Chicano art collective to be exhibited at a museum (LACMA, 1973). De la Rocha's great grandfather, Jose Isaac de la Rocha Acosta (1882–1920), was a Mexican revolutionary who fought in the Mexican Revolution. His maternal grandfather, Manuel García, was originally from Sonora and worked as an agricultural laborer in the U.S. De la Rocha would later see the hardships his grandfather endured reflected in the struggles of the Zapatista Army of National Liberation.

De la Rocha's parents divorced when he was six, and he moved from East Los Angeles to Irvine with his mother, who attended the University of California, Irvine and earned a PhD in anthropology. De la Rocha later described Irvine as "one of the most racist cities imaginable" and said that "if you were a Mexican in Irvine, you were there because you had a broom or a hammer in your hand."

== Musical career ==
=== Early career ===
De la Rocha met Tim Commerford in elementary school. In junior high school, they both played guitar in a band called Juvenile Expression. De la Rocha's interest in punk rock bands like The Clash, The Misfits, Sex Pistols, and Bad Religion turned into an appreciation for other bands like Minor Threat, Bad Brains, and The Teen Idles. In 1987, he joined the straight edge band Hard Stance. In 2018, Indecision Records officially released Hard Stance's entire discography.

=== Inside Out ===
By 1988, singer Eric Ernst had departed from Hard Stance, leading to de la Rocha taking on lead vocals. Now lacking a guitarist, the remaining members contacted Vic DiCara, whom some knew from their previous band that never made it past rehearsals. This act, now named Inside Out, began writing music heavily inspired by acts like Minor Threat and Bad Brains, and soon were associated with the youth crew movement. Their sole release was the 1990 EP No Spiritual Surrender, issued through Revelation Records.

Towards the end of the band's lifetime, DiCara and de la Rocha's writing styles began to fracture. De la Rocha wished to push the groups into a more political and hip-hop-inspired direction, particularly influenced by Run-DMC, whereas DiCara wished for the band to write more music inspired by Hare Krishna. While de la Rocha's influence was prevalent on performed yet unreleased Inside Out tracks like Darkness of Greed and Rage Against the Machine, the band broke up because of this conflict in 1991. De la Rocha later said that the band was "about completely detaching ourselves from society to see ourselves as ... as spirits, and not bowing down to a system that sees you as just another pebble on a beach. I channeled all my anger out through that band."

The band had a brief reunion in 1993, performing in a number of locations including multiple in Salt Lake City.

=== Rage Against the Machine ===
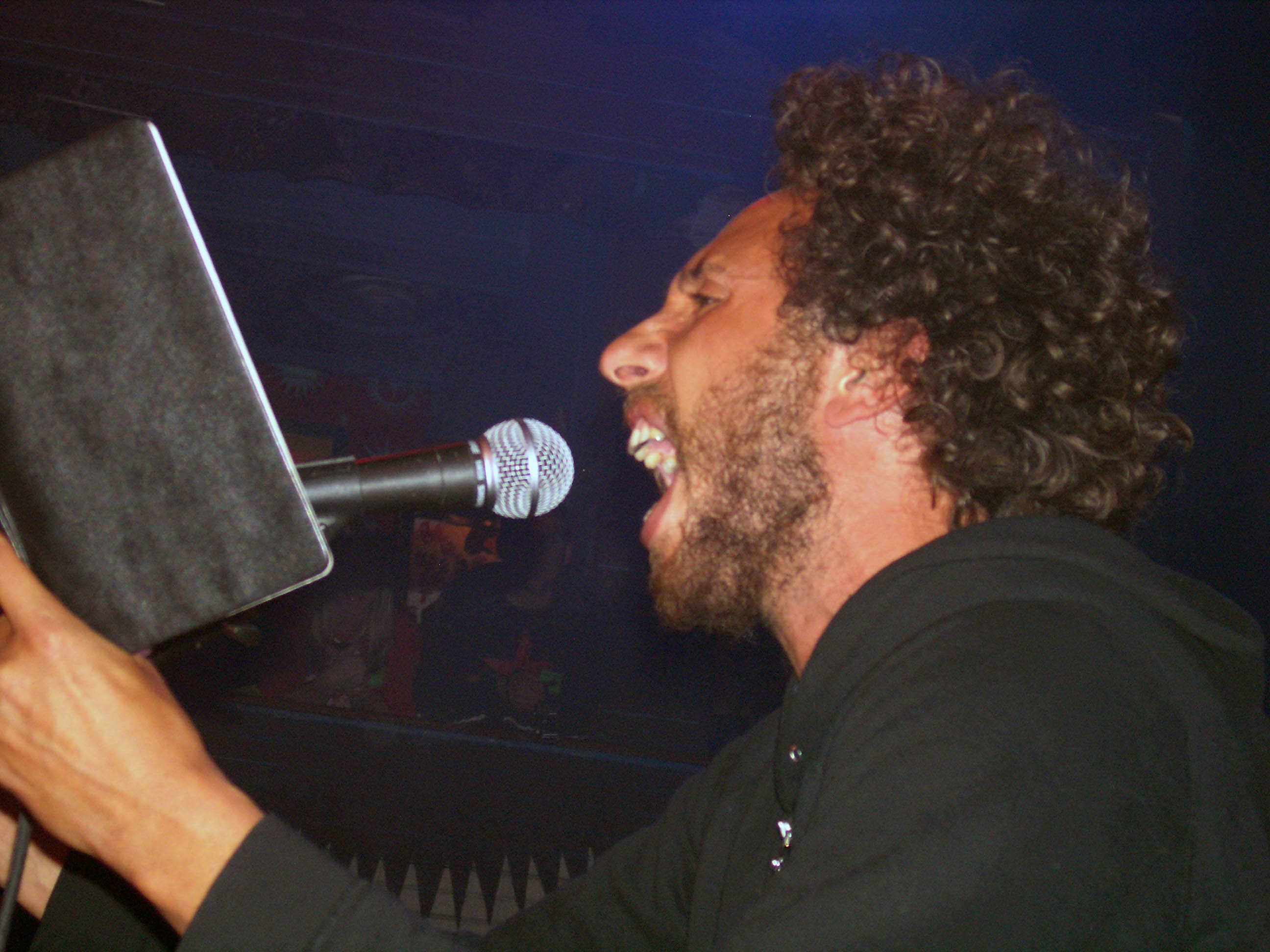
De la Rocha performing live

Following the dissolution of Inside Out in 1991, de la Rocha embraced hip-hop and began freestyling at local clubs, at one of which he was approached by former Lock Up guitarist Tom Morello, who was impressed by de la Rocha's lyrics, and convinced him to form a band. Morello recruited former Greta drummer Brad Wilk—who had previously auditioned for Lock Up before that band's dissolution earlier that same year—and de la Rocha recruited his former Juvenile Expression bandmate, Tim Commerford, to play bass. The band was named after an unreleased Inside Out record, Rage Against the Machine.

Rage Against the Machine released their debut album in 1992 to critical and commercial success. The band was on the main stage at Lollapalooza by 1993 and was one of the most politically charged bands ever to receive extensive airplay from radio and MTV. Rage's second and third albums peaked at number one in the United States, but did not result in the political action de la Rocha had hoped for. He became increasingly restless and undertook collaborations with artists such as KRS-One, Chuck D, and Public Enemy. He left Rage Against the Machine in October 2000, citing "creative differences," at which time he issued a statement saying: "it was necessary to leave Rage because our decision-making process has completely failed", in reference to the disagreement over the release of Renegades. The other members of the band sought out separate management and secured the immediate release of Renegades. After searching for a replacement for de la Rocha, the other members of Rage joined Chris Cornell of Soundgarden to form Audioslave.

=== Solo career ===
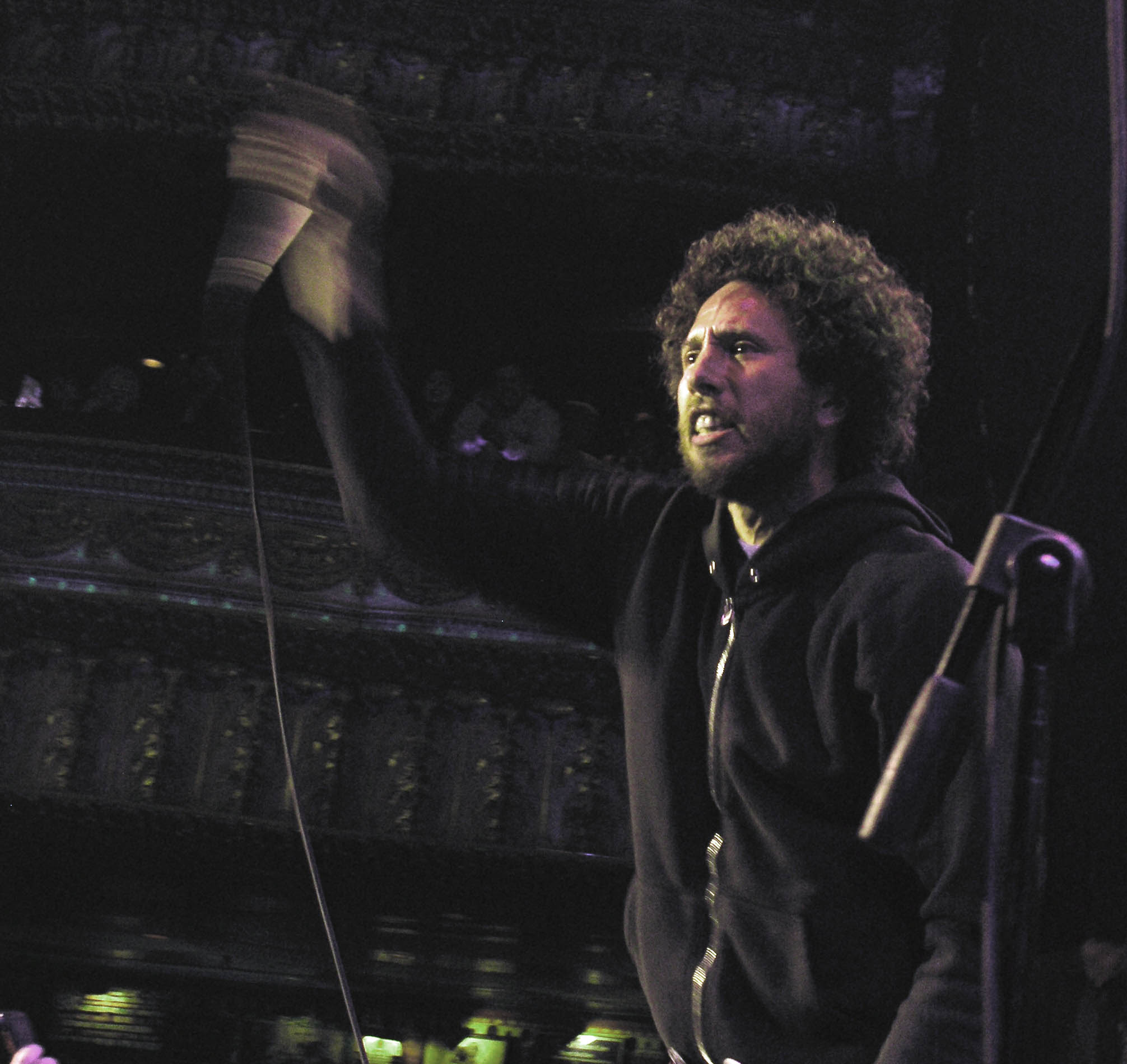
Zack de la Rocha on stage with Rage Against the Machine in 2007

Following the disbandment of Rage Against the Machine, de la Rocha worked on a solo album he had been recording since before the band's dissolution, working with DJ Shadow, El-P, Muggs, Dan The Automator, Roni Size, DJ Premier and Questlove with production partner James Poyser. The album never came to fruition, and de la Rocha started a new collaboration with Trent Reznor of Nine Inch Nails, in which around 20 tracks were produced. Reznor thought the work was "excellent", but said the songs will likely never be released as de la Rocha was not "ready to make a record" at that time. On working with DJ Shadow and Reznor, de la Rocha admitted in a 2008 interview that:

When I left Rage ... first off, I was very heartbroken, and secondly, I became obsessed with completely reinventing my wheel. In an unhealthy way, to a degree. I kind of forgot that old way of allowing yourself to just be a conduit. When I was working with Trent and Shadow, I felt that I was going through the motions. Not that what was produced wasn't great, but I feel now that I've maybe reinvented the base sounds that emanate from the songs.

In 2000, de la Rocha appeared on the song "Centre of the Storm", from the Roni Size/Reprazent album In The Mode, while in 2002, he appeared in a minor role in the first part of the Blackalicious song "Release" on the album Blazing Arrow. A new collaboration between de la Rocha and DJ Shadow, the song "March of Death", was released for free online in 2003 in protest against the imminent invasion of Iraq. As part of the collaboration de la Rocha released a statement which included the following:

Lies, sanctions, and cruise missiles have never created a free and just society. Only everyday people can do that, which is why I'm joining the millions world wide who have stood up to oppose the Bush administration's attempt to expand the U.S. empire at the expense of human rights at home and abroad. In this spirit I'm releasing this song for anyone who is willing to listen. I hope it not only makes us think, but also inspires us to act and raise our voices.

The 2004 soundtrack Songs and Artists that Inspired Fahrenheit 9/11 included one of the collaborations with Reznor, "We Want It All". This album also contained "No One Left", the debut recording by former Rage Against the Machine guitarist Tom Morello as The Nightwatchman. On October 7, 2005, de la Rocha returned to the stage with new material, performing with Son Jarocho band Son de Madera. He later spoke as MC and again performed with Son de Madera at the November 22 Concert at the Farm, a benefit concert for the South Central Farmers. He sang and played the jarana with the band, and performed his own new original material, including the song "Sea of Dead Hands". On September 8, 2016, it was reported that de la Rocha's first solo album was complete and would be released in early 2017. The news came with a new song, produced by El-P, called "Digging for Windows" that was released on YouTube and BitTorrent. However, to date, the album remains unreleased with no further announcements made.

=== Rage Against the Machine reunion ===
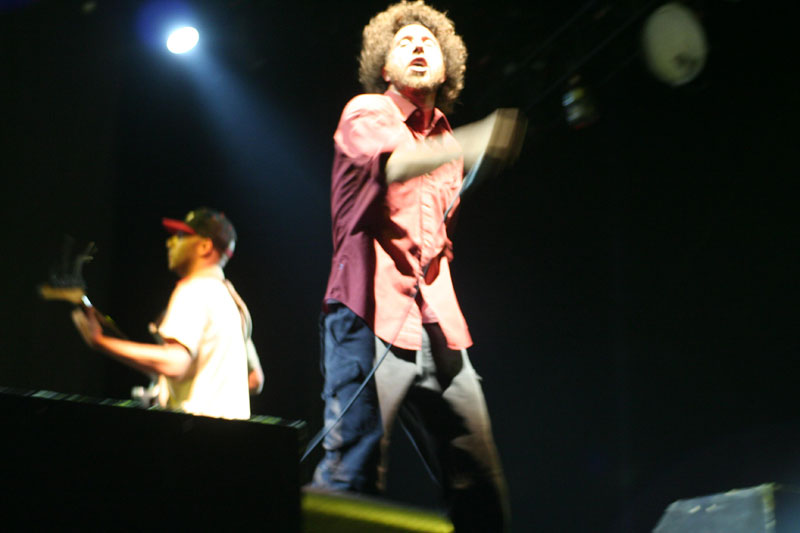
De la Rocha performing with Rage Against the Machine at Coachella 2007

Rumors that Rage Against the Machine could reunite at the Coachella Valley Music and Arts Festival were circulating in mid-January 2007 and were confirmed on January 22. The band was confirmed to be headlining the final day of Coachella 2007. Rage Against the Machine, as a full band, headlined the final day of the 2007 Coachella Valley Music and Arts Festival on April 29. The band played in front of a Zapatista Army of National Liberation (EZLN) backdrop to the largest crowds of the festival. The performance was initially thought to be a one-off, but the band played seven more shows in the United States in 2007, and in January 2008, they played their first shows outside the US as part of the Big Day Out Festival in Australia and New Zealand. The band continued to tour around the world, headlining many large festivals in Europe and the United States, including Lollapalooza in Chicago and the Reading and Leeds Festivals. In a 2008 interview, de la Rocha said this of the relationship between him, Commerford, Wilk and Morello:

So much has changed. When you get older, you look back on tensions and grievances and have another perspective on it. I think our relationship now is better than it's ever been. I would even describe it as great. We're going to keep playing shows – we have a couple of big ones happening in front of both conventions. As far as us recording music in the future, I don't know where we all fit with that. We've all embraced each other's projects and support them, and that's great.

Later in 2011, de la Rocha and the rest of Rage Against the Machine reunited to headline LA Rising on July 30, 2011. The show filled the LA Coliseum.

A second reunion tour was announced for the spring of 2020. The band was scheduled to perform 52 shows (39 in the United States, 5 in Canada, and 8 in Europe) from March 26 to September 12 but were forced to postpone the tour until 2022 amid the COVID-19 pandemic. The tour was eventually cancelled after de la Rocha tore his Achilles tendon halfway through the second show.

=== One Day as a Lion ===
In 2008, de la Rocha and former Mars Volta drummer Jon Theodore formed One Day as a Lion. They later added Joey Karam of The Locust on keyboards for their live shows. The group combines rock drumming, electro keyboards, and hip-hop vocals. De la Rocha played keyboards as well as providing vocals, with Theodore on the drums for their self-titled EP. They released their debut EP, One Day as a Lion, on July 22, 2008.

=== Other projects ===
For a brief period in 1988, de la Rocha played drums for hardcore punk band No For An Answer.

In 1989, de la Rocha joined Farside, playing guitar in the group until 1991.

In 1991, de la Rocha formed a band with John Porcelly based at the Revelation Records headquarters in Huntington Beach, California, in which de la Rocha was the vocalist and Porcelly played guitar. Although the group never officially had a name, at one point in time, de la Rocha proposed the name "Rage Against the Machine"; however, Porcelly believed the name to be too long, leading to de la Rocha using it as the name for his other band at the time. The band's music merged elements of hardcore punk and hip-hop.

== Activism ==
De la Rocha advocates in favor of Leonard Peltier, Mumia Abu-Jamal, and the Zapatista (EZLN) movement in Mexico. He spoke on the floor of the UN, testifying against the United States and its treatment of Abu-Jamal. De la Rocha has been particularly outspoken on the cause of the EZLN. De la Rocha and Rage Against The Machine hosted a benefit show in January 1999 alongside the Beastie Boys to raise attention towards Abu-Jamal's case. The concert was mired in controversy as New Jersey Governor Christine Todd Whitman denounced the show and encouraged people not to attend; the show ultimately sold out.

Zack's Chicano identity informed his band's commitment to what they view as the struggles of immigrants, people of color, and the Zapatistas. He renamed the People's Resource Center in Highland Park to the "Centro de Regeneracion". There, many of the same artists and activists who had participated in the struggle over the Peace and Justice Center maintained their commitment to providing youth a space for cultural expression and training. Along with music workshops and the development of Radio Clandestina, Centro members also organized graffiti workshops and youth film festivals. The Centro lasted only two years; within that timespan it was viewed by its members and staff as an important space in the ongoing institutionalization of the community politics, cultural practices, and social networks of the Eastside scene in the nineties.

The EZLN and de la Rocha's experiences with them inspired the songs "People of the Sun", "Wind Below" and "Without a Face" from Evil Empire, and "War Within a Breath" from The Battle of Los Angeles. Zack de la Rocha asked their record label, Epic Records, for $30,000 to donate to the EZLN. It is not known if they complied. The EZLN flag has been used as a stage backdrop at all of the band's shows since their reunion in April 2007. On his post-Rage political music, de la Rocha admitted that it was near impossible for him to draw the line between politics and music.

On April 14, 2007, Morello and de la Rocha reunited on-stage early to perform a brief acoustic set at House of Blues in Chicago at the rally for fair food with the Coalition of Immokalee Workers (CIW). Morello described the event as "very exciting for everybody in the room, myself included". At Rage's first reunion show, de la Rocha made a speech during "Wake Up" in which de la Rocha called numerous American presidents war criminals, citing a statement by Noam Chomsky regarding the Nuremberg Principles.

Like bandmate Tom Morello, Zack de la Rocha is vegetarian. In an interview, he stated, "I think vegetarianism is really great, and I stand really strongly behind it. I think that an animal goes through a lot of pain in the whole cycle of death in the slaughterhouse; just living to be killed. I just don't think it's worth eating that animal. There's so much other food out there that doesn't have to involve you in that cycle of pain and death."

In November 2023, de la Rocha attended a pro-Palestinian protest in Washington, D.C., and signed an open letter calling for a ceasefire in the Gaza war.

== Discography ==
=== Studio albums ===
==== with Hard Stance ====
De la Rocha played guitar on the following albums:

- Face Reality (EP) 7" (1988)
- Hard Stance (EP) 7" (1989)

==== with Inside Out ====
De la Rocha credited for vocals:

- No Spiritual Surrender (1990)
- Benefit 7" (live bootleg recording with Youth of Today) (1992)

==== with Rage Against the Machine ====
De la Rocha credited for vocals:

- Rage Against the Machine (1992)
- Evil Empire (1996)
- Live & Rare (1998)
- The Battle of Los Angeles (1999)
- Renegades (2000)
- Live at the Grand Olympic Auditorium (2003)

==== with One Day as a Lion ====
De la Rocha credited for vocals and keyboards:

- One Day as a Lion (2008)

=== Solo and collaborations ===
- "Mumia 911" from Mumia 911, a benefit EP also featuring a dozen hiphop artists collectively known as The Unbound Allstars (1999)
- "C.I.A. (Criminals in Action)" with KRS-One and The Last Emperor, from Lyricist Lounge, Volume One compilation and remixed on 12" vinyl single (reissued in 2002), (1999)
- "Burned Hollywood Burned" from Bamboozled soundtrack (2000) with Chuck D and The Roots
- "Centre of the Storm" from In the Møde, Roni Size/Reprazent (2000)
- "Release" from Blazing Arrow, Blackalicious (2002)
- "Disavowed" from You Can't Go Home Again (The Private Press era), DJ Shadow (additional drums and co-production) (2002)
- "March of Death" with DJ Shadow, free on marchofdeath.com (2003)
- "We Want It All" produced by Trent Reznor, from Songs and Artists That Inspired Fahrenheit 9/11 and digital single (2004)
- "Act III Scene 2 (Shakespeare)" from Saul Williams, Saul Williams (2004)
- "Artifact" with DJ Shadow, unreleased, recorded circa 2002–2003; the instrumental appeared on DJ Shadow's album The Outsider (2006)
- "Somos Más Americanos" from "MTV Unplugged presents: Los Tigres del Norte And Friends" Los Tigres del Norte (2011)
- "Melding of the Minds" from Event II, Deltron 3030 (2013)
- "Close Your Eyes (And Count to Fuck)" from Run the Jewels 2 (2014)
- "Digging for Windows" produced by El-P (2016)
- "A Report To The Shareholders / Kill Your Masters" from Run the Jewels 3 (2016)
- "Ju$t" from Run the Jewels 4 (2020).
- "Irreversible Damage" from Shook by Algiers (2023)
