= Eve discography =

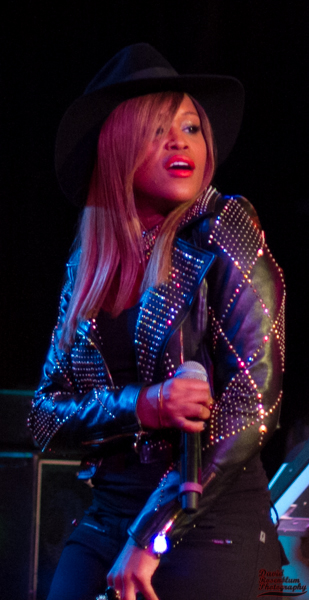
- Eve performing at The Roxy Theatre during the Lip Lock Tour in 2013.
- Studio albums: 4
- Singles: 37
- Music videos: 30
- Promotional singles: 5

The discography of American rapper Eve consists of four studio albums, 37 singles (including 23 as a featured artist), 5 promotional singles and 30 music videos.

== Studio albums ==
List of studio albums, with selected chart positions, sales figures and certifications
Title	Album details	Peak chart positions										Sales	Certifications
Title	Album details	US	US R&B	AUS	CAN	FRA	GER	NL	NZ	SWI	UK	Sales	Certifications
Let There Be Eve...Ruff Ryders' First Lady	Released: September 14, 1999 (US); Label: Ruff Ryders, Interscope; Formats: CD, LP, cassette, digital download	1	1	—	16	—	—	—	—	—	—	US: 2,000,000	RIAA: 2× Platinum; MC: Gold
Scorpion	Released: March 6, 2001 (US); Label: Ruff Ryders, Interscope; Formats: CD, LP, cassette, digital download	4	1	92	20	37	32	34	15	41	22	US: 1,500,000	RIAA: Platinum; BPI: Gold; MC: Platinum; RMNZ: Gold; SNEP: Gold
Eve-Olution	Released: August 27, 2002 (US); Label: Ruff Ryders, Interscope; Formats: CD, LP, cassette, digital download	6	1	36	8	15	22	40	23	4	47	US: 630,000	RIAA: Gold; BPI: Silver; RMNZ: Platinum
Lip Lock	Released: May 14, 2013; Label: From the Rib, RED; Formats: CD, digital download	46	7	—	—	—	—	—	—	—	—		
"—" denotes a recording that did not chart or was not released in that territory.

== Singles ==
=== As lead artist ===
List of singles, with selected chart positions and certifications, showing year released and album name
Title	Year	Peak chart positions										Certifications	Album
Title	Year	US	US R&B	US Rap	AUS	GER	IRL	NZ	SWE	SWI	UK	Certifications	Album
"What Ya Want" (featuring Nokio)	1999	29	9	1	—	—	—	—	—	—	—		Ryde or Die, Vol. 1
"Love Is Blind" (featuring Faith Evans)	1999	34	11	10	—	—	—	—	—	—	—		Let There Be Eve...Ruff Ryders' First Lady
"Gotta Man"	1999	26	10	8	—	—	—	—	—	—	—		Let There Be Eve...Ruff Ryders' First Lady
"Got It All" (with Jadakiss)	2000	88	27	9	—	—	—	—	—	—	—		Ryde or Die, Vol. 2
"Who's That Girl?"	2001	47	16	5	—	21	4	—	29	8	6	RIAA: Gold; BPI: Gold; RMNZ: Platinum	Scorpion
"Let Me Blow Ya Mind" (featuring Gwen Stefani)	2001	2	6	10	4	5	1	7	6	1	4	RIAA: 3× Platinum; ARIA: Platinum; BPI: Platinum; BVMI: Gold; IFPI SWE: Gold; IFPI SWI: Gold; RMNZ: 4× Platinum	Scorpion
"Gangsta Lovin'" (featuring Alicia Keys)	2002	2	2	2	4	21	15	7	10	6	6	ARIA: Platinum; BPI: Silver; RMNZ: Platinum	Eve-Olution
"Satisfaction"	2003	27	22	8	—	68	34	—	—	—	20		Eve-Olution
"Tambourine"	2007	37	17	10	—	78	16	—	—	—	18	BPI: Silver; RMNZ: Platinum	non-album singles
"Give It to You" (featuring Sean Paul)	2007	— (Note: "Give It to You" did not enter the Billboard Hot 100, but peaked at number 24 on the Bubbling Under Hot 100 Singles chart.)	— (Note: "Give It to You" did not enter the Billboard Hot R&B/Hip-Hop Songs chart, but peaked at number 14 on the Bubbling Under R&B/Hip-Hop Singles chart.)	—	—	49	—	—	—	—	—		non-album singles
"She Bad Bad"	2012	—	—	—	—	—	—	—	—	—	—		Lip Lock
"Make It Out This Town" (featuring Gabe Saporta)	2013	—	—	—	—	—	—	—	—	—	—		Lip Lock
"Eve" (featuring Miss Kitty)	2013	—	—	—	—	—	—	—	—	—	—		Lip Lock
"Reload" (featuring Konshens)	2019	—	—	—	—	—	—	—	—	—	—		non-album single
"—" denotes a recording that did not chart or was not released in that territory.

=== As featured artist ===
List of singles as featured artist, with selected chart positions, showing year released and album name
Title	Year	Peak chart positions										Certifications	Album
Title	Year	US	US R&B	US Rap	AUS	FRA	GER	NZ	SWE	SWI	UK	Certifications	Album
"You Got Me" (The Roots featuring Erykah Badu and Eve)	1999	39	11	19	—	28	25	37	—	15	31	BPI: Silver; RMNZ: Gold	Things Fall Apart
"Girlfriend/Boyfriend" (Blackstreet & Janet Jackson featuring Ja Rule and Eve)	1999	47	17	—	16	71	98	12	59	—	11		Finally
"Hot Boyz" (Missy Elliott featuring Lil' Mo, Nas, Eve and Q-Tip)	1999	5	1	1	—	78	52	34	—	—	18	RIAA: Platinum	Da Real World
"Triflin'" (Coko featuring Eve)	1999	—	69	—	—	—	—	—	—	—	—		Hot Coko
"Ruff Ryders' Anthem (Remix)" (DJ Clue? featuring DMX, Jadakiss, Styles P, Drag-On and Eve)	1999	—	47	—	—	—	—	—	—	—	—		The Professional
"Ryde or Die, Bitch" (The LOX featuring Eve and Timbaland)	1999	73	27	22	—	—	—	—	—	—	—		We Are the Streets
"Remember Them Days" (Beanie Sigel featuring Eve)	2000	—	69	33	—	—	—	—	—	—	—		The Truth
"Caramel" (City High featuring Eve)	2001	18	9	—	47	—	70	—	—	—	9		City High
"Brotha Part II" (Angie Stone featuring Alicia Keys and Eve)	2001	—	13	—	—	37	—	—	59	—	—		Mahogany Soul
"4 My People" (Missy Elliott featuring Eve)	2002	—	—	—	20	37	21	—	19	40	5	BPI: Silver	Miss E... So Addictive
"Get Up" (Nate Dogg featuring Eve)	2003	—	81	—	—	—	—	—	—	—	—		Nate Dogg
"Not Today" (Mary J. Blige featuring Eve)	2004	41	21	—	—	57	—	—	—	—	40	RIAA: Platinum (Video single)	Love & Life
"Never" (Keyshia Cole featuring Eve)	2004	—	71	—	—	—	—	—	—	—	—		Barbershop 2: Back in Business
"Rich Girl" (Gwen Stefani featuring Eve)	2004	7	78	—	2	4	14	3	4	6	4	RIAA: 2× Platinum; ARIA: Platinum; BPI: Gold; IFPI SWE: Gold; RMNZ: Platinum	Love. Angel. Music. Baby.
"Like This" (Kelly Rowland featuring Eve)	2007	30	7	—	13	—	—	11	—	77	4	RIAA: Gold; BPI: Silver; RMNZ: Gold	Ms. Kelly
"Patron Tequila" (Paradiso Girls featuring Lil Jon and Eve)	2009	—	—	—	—	—	—	—	—	—	—		Crazy Horse
"Rocket Scientist" (Teddybears featuring Eve)	2010	—	—	—	—	—	—	—	30	—	—		Devil's Music
"Who's That Girl" (Guy Sebastian featuring Eve)	2010	—	—	—	1	—	—	1	—	—	—	ARIA: 6× Platinum; RMNZ: 2× Platinum	Twenty Ten
"Everyday (Coolin')" (Swizz Beatz featuring Eve)	2011	—	81	—	—	—	—	—	—	—	—		non-album single
"Money In da Bank" (Timati featuring Eve)	2011	—	—	—	—	—	—	—	—	—	—		SWAGG
"Girls Just Wanna Have Fun" (Shaggy featuring Eve)	2012	—	—	—	—	180	29	—	—	—	—		Rise
"WWYS (Why Would You Stop)" (Riddim Commission featuring Eve)	2014	—	—	—	—	—	—	—	—	—	—		Riddim. Bass. Life
"What's Your Love Like" (Paul Oakenfold featuring Eve and Baby E)	2020	—	—	—	—	—	—	—	—	—	—		Shine On
"Immortal Queen (Remix)" (Sia featuring Chaka Khan and Eve)	2024	—	—	—	—	—	—	—	—	—	—		non-album single
"—" denotes a recording that did not chart or was not released in that territory.

=== Promotional singles ===
List of promotional singles, with selected chart position, showing year released and album name
Title	Year	Peak chart positions			Certifications	Album
Title	Year	US R&B	FRA	NZ	Certifications	Album
"Let's Talk About" (featuring Drag-On)	1999	82	—	—		Let There Be Eve...Ruff Ryders' First Lady
"U, Me & She"	2001	52	—	—		Ryde or Die Vol. 3: In the "R" We Trust
"Got What You Need" (featuring Drag-On)	2002	—	15	40	RMNZ: Platinum; SNEP: Silver	Scorpion
"Shame" (Jill Scott featuring Eve and The A Group)	2011	—	—	—		The Light of the Sun
"Nasty Girl" (with Queens cast: Brandy, Naturi Naughton and Nadine Velazquez)	2021	—	—	—		Queens soundtrack
"—" denotes a recording that did not chart or was not released in that territory..

== Other charted songs ==
List of songs, with selected chart positions, showing year released and album name
Title	Year	Peak chart positions	Album
Title	Year	US R&B	Album
"Speechless" (Alicia Keys featuring Eve)	2010	71	Monster Mondays Vol. 1
"—" denotes a recording that did not chart.

== Guest appearances ==
List of non-single guest appearances, with other performing artists, showing year released and album name
Title	Year	Other artist(s)	Album
"Hot Wit You"	1999	Prince	Rave Un2 the Joy Fantastic
"The Greatest Romance Ever Sold (Adam & Eve Remix)"	1999	Prince	Rave In2 the Joy Fantastic
"Joanne (Remix)"	1999	Trina & Tamara	Trina & Tamara
"Can You Feel Me?"	1999	Will Smith	Willennium
"We Got That"	1999	Warren G, Drag-On, Shadow	I Want It All
"Ryde or Die"	1999	Styles P, Jadakiss, DMX, Sheek Louch, Drag-On	Ryde or Die Vol. 1
"Do That Shit"	1999	None	Ryde or Die Vol. 1
"Do the Ladies Run This?"	2000	Rah Digga, Sonja Blade	Dirty Harriet
"U Told Me"	2000	The LOX	We Are the Streets
"If You Know"	2000	The L.O.X., Drag-On, Swizz Beatz	We Are the Streets
"Here We Go"	2000	Drag-On	Opposite of H2O
"Ready 2 Ryde"	2000	Snoop Dogg	Tha Last Meal
"Where I've Been"	2001	Mary J. Blige	No More Drama
"Where Is the Love"	2001	Damian Marley	Halfway Tree
"It's Time I See You"	2001	Jadakiss, The L.O.X., Drag-On, Infa-Red & Cross	Kiss tha Game Goodbye
"Butterflies (Remix)"	2002	Michael Jackson	None
"Ladies 1st"	2002	Trina	Diamond Princess
"And I Came To..."	2002	Styles P, Sheek Louch, Swizz Beatz	A Gangster and a Gentleman
"Philly's Finest	2002	Charli Baltimore	The Diary (You Think You Know)
"Island Spice"	2002	None	Swizz Beatz Presents G.H.E.T.T.O. Stories
"Party and Bullshit" (Remix)	2003	Rah Digga, Missy Elliott	None
"We're back"	2003	DMX, Jadakiss	Grand Champ
"Wake Up Everybody"	2004	Various Artists	Wake Up Everybody
"U Had Me, Pt. 2"	2004	Drag-On, Aja Smith	Hell and Back
"1 Thing (Remix)"	2005	Amerie	Touch
"No Daddy (Remix)"	2005	Teairra Mari	None
"Rendez-vous In Hell (Intro)"	2007	DJ Laibi	Rendez-vous In Hell Vol. 1
"(No More) What Ifs"	2007	Natasha Bedingfield	N.B.
"Money in the Bank (Remix)"	2007	Swizz Beatz, Young Jeezy, Elephant Man	None
"Wake Up Call (Live Remix)"	2007	Maroon 5	None
"Control"	2007	Wisin & Yandel	Wisin vs. Yandel: Los Extraterrestres
"Cash Rulez"	2007	Cassidy, Bone Thugs-n-Harmony	B.A.R.S. The Barry Adrian Reese Story
"Mirror"	2007	Mary J. Blige	Growing Pains
"Victory Lap"	2008	Yung Berg, Collie Buddz	Look What You Made Me
"Gettin' Up (Swizz Beatz Remix)"	2008	Q-Tip	None
"Dirty Laundry"	2009	Mashonda	The Renovation Series
"Dance Floor"	2009	Mashonda	The Renovation Series
"Who's Real (Ruff Riders Remix)"	2009	Sheek Louch, Styles P, Drag-On, DMX, Swizz Beatz	None
"Suicide Love"	2009	Wyclef Jean	From the Hut, to the Projects, to the Mansion
"Young Girl"	2009	Teyana Taylor	From a Planet Called Harlem
"My Chick Bad (Remix)"	2010	Ludacris, Diamond, Trina	Battle of the Sexes
"On a Mission (Remix)"	2010	Gabriella Cilmi	None
"He Is at My House"	2010	Lady Saw	My Way
"Philly Shit (Mega Mix)"	2011	Young Chris, Black Thought, Money Malc, Fat Joe, Fred the Godson, Diggy Simmons, Jermaine Dupri, The Game	none
"Hot Steppa #1"	2011	Swizz Beatz	Monster Mondays Vol. 1
"Speechless"	2011	Alicia Keys	Monster Mondays Vol. 1
"Nothing to Say"	2011	Timbaland	Timbaland Thursday
"Get Em"	2011	Wolfgang Gartner	Weekend in America
"Let 'Em Know"	2011	Alex 242	none
"Hot Steppa"	2011	None	Ruff Ryders: Past, Present, Future
"Brand New Bitch" (Remix)	2012	Anjulie	None
"Money Green"	2013	Lady Saw, New Kidz	Pink Wall Riddim
"Northern Lights" (Remix)	2013	Dawn Richard	None
"Gone" (Live Remix)	2013	Kelly Rowland, Sevyn Streeter	None
"I'm Better" (Remix)	2017	Missy Elliott, Lil' Kim, Trina	None
"Tonight"	2021	Doja Cat	Planet Her (Deluxe)
"In the Club"	2022	Honey Dijon	Black Girl Magic

== Soundtrack appearances ==
Song	Year	Other artist(s)		Film/Series
"Eve of Destruction"	1998	N/A		Bulworth
"Move Right Now"	2000	Swizz Beatz, Drag-On		Any Given Sunday
"Road Dawgs"	2000	Amil, Da Brat, Jay-Z		Backstage
"Let Me Be"	2001	N/A		Nutty Professor II: The Klumps
"Cowboy"	2002	Fatboy Slim		Blade II
"Let Go (Hit the Dance Floor)"	2003	Jadakiss		Bringing Down the House
"Your Love (L.O.V.E. Reggae Mix)" (The Outfield)	2004	Wyclef Jean		50 First Dates
"Not Today"	2004	Mary J. Blige		Barbershop 2
"Set It on Fire"	2008	N/A		Transporter 3
"The Introduction"	2021	Brandy, Naturi Naughton, Nadine Velazquez	Pepi Sonuga	Queens
"All Rise (The Supreme Court)"	2021	Brandy, Naturi Naughton, Nadine Velazquez	Pepi Sonuga	Queens
"Heart of Queens"	2021	Brandy, Naturi Naughton, Nadine Velazquez	Cam'ron	Queens
"Belly of the Bitch"	2021	Brandy, Naturi Naughton, Nadine Velazquez	N/A	Queens
"Girls Gonna Run That"	2021	Brandy, Naturi Naughton, Nadine Velazquez	N/A	Queens
