= List of awards and nominations received by Eve =

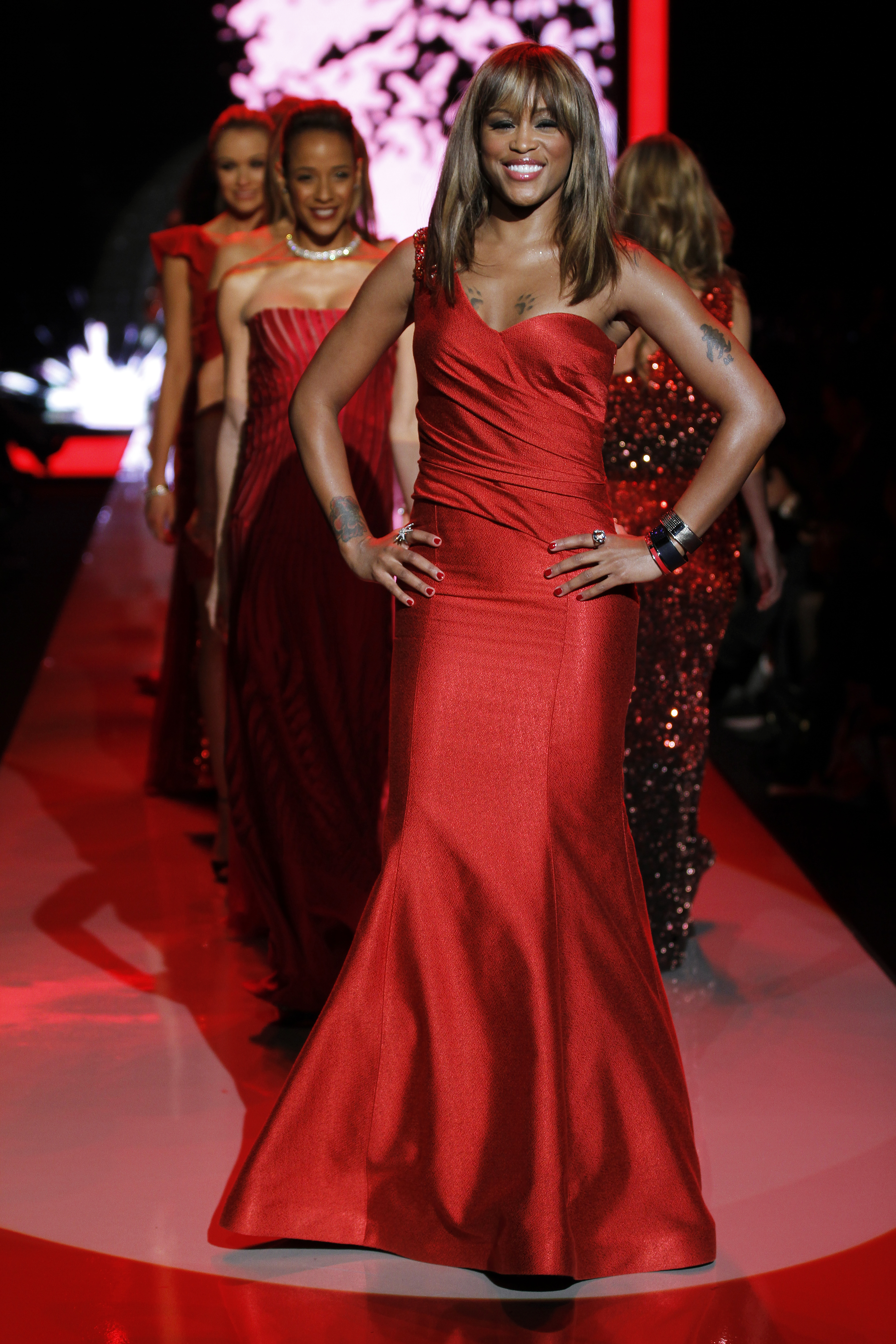
Eve at The Heart Truth's Red Dress Collection Fashion Show, 2011

The American rap artist Eve has received a wide variety of music awards since 2000.

== American Music Awards ==
Year	Nominee / work	Award	Result
2000	Herself	Favorite Soul/R&B New Artist	Nominated
2003	Herself	Favorite Female Hip-Hop Artist	Nominated

== ASCAP ==
=== ASCAP Pop Music Awards ===
Year	Nominee / work	Award	Result	Ref.
2002	"Let Me Blow Ya Mind"	Most Performed Songs	Won	
2005	"Rich Girl"	Most Performed Songs	Won	

=== ASCAP Rhythm & Soul Awards ===
Year	Nominee / work	Award	Result
2001	"Hot Boyz"	R&B Award-Winning R&B/Hip-Hop Songs	Won
2001	"Hot Boyz"	Top Rap Song	Won
2002	"Let Me Blow Ya Mind	R&B Award-Winning R&B/Hip-Hop Songs	Won

== BET ==
=== BET Awards ===
Year	Nominee / work	Award	Result
2001	Herself	Best Female Hip-Hop Artist	Won
2003	Herself	Best Female Hip-Hop Artist	Nominated
2008	Herself	Best Female Hip-Hop Artist	Nominated
2013	Herself	Best Female Hip-Hop Artist	Nominated
2014	Herself	Best Female Hip-Hop Artist	Nominated

== Billboard Music Awards ==
Year	Nominee / work	Award	Result
2002	"Let Me Blow Ya Mind"	Best Rap/Hip-Hop Clip of the Year	Nominated

== Black Reel Awards ==
Year	Nominee / work	Award	Result
2005	Herself (for The Woodsman)	Best Actress	Won

== BMI ==
=== BMI Pop Awards ===
Year	Nominee / work	Award	Result
2004	"Gangsta Lovin'"	Award Winning Songs	Won

== Emmy Awards ==
=== Daytime Emmy Awards ===
Year	Nominee / work	Award	Result
2019	The Talk	Outstanding Entertainment Talk Show Host	Nominated
2020	The Talk	Outstanding Entertainment Talk Show Host	Nominated

== Grammy Awards ==
Year	Nominee / work	Award	Result
2002	"Let Me Blow Ya Mind" (Ft. Gwen Stefani)	Best Rap/Sung Collaboration	Won
2002	Scorpion	Best Rap Album	Nominated
2003	"Satisfaction"	Best Female Rap Solo Performance	Nominated
2006	"Rich Girl" (with Gwen Stefani)	Best Rap/Sung Collaboration	Nominated
2022	Planet Her (deluxe) (as featured artist)	Album of the Year	Nominated
2026	"You Got Me" (The Roots Ft. Erykah Badu & Eve)	Post Grammy Award for Best Rap Performance by a Duo or Group (2000)	Won

== MCP Awards ==
Year	Nominee / work	Award	Result
2013	Lip Lock	Incredible Album	Won
2013	Herself	Major Indie	Won
2013	"Eve" ( ft. Miss. Kitty)	Comeback Kid	Won

== MTV ==
=== MTV Movie Awards ===
Year	Nominee / work	Award	Result
2003	Herself (for Barbershop)	Best Female Breakthrough Performance	Nominated

=== MTV Video Music Awards ===
Year	Nominee / work	Award	Result
2000	"Love Is Blind"	Best Rap Video	Nominated
2001	"Let Me Blow Ya Mind" (with Gwen Stefani)	Best Female Video	Won
2001	"Let Me Blow Ya Mind" (with Gwen Stefani)	Viewer's Choice	Nominated
2001	"Let Me Blow Ya Mind" (with Gwen Stefani)	Best Hip-Hop Video	Nominated
2007	"Tambourine"	Best Choreography	Nominated

== Much Music Video Awards ==
Year	Nominee / work	Award	Result
2005	"Rich Girl"	People's Choice: Favourite International Artist	Won

== Nickelodeon Kids Choice Awards ==
Year	Nominee / work	Award	Result
2005	Eve	Favorite Television Actress	Nominated
2006	Eve	Favorite Television Actress	Nominated

== Soul Train ==
=== Soul Train Awards ===
Year	Nominee / work	Award	Result
2000	"Gotta Man"	Best New R&B/Soul or Rap Artist	Nominated
2000	"Hot Boyz"	Best Music Video	Nominated
2000	"Hot Boyz"	Best R&B/Soul or Rap Music Video	Won

== Teen Choice Awards ==
The Teen Choice Awards is an awards show presented annually by the Fox Broadcasting Company. Eve has received four awards from six nominations.

Year	Nominee / work	Award	Result
2001	"Let Me Blow Ya Mind"	Choice R&B/Hip Hop Track	Won
2002	"Gangsta Lovin'"	Choice Hook Up	Nominated
2003	Barbershop	Choice Female Break out Movie Star	Nominated
2003	Herself	Choice Crossover Artist	Nominated
2004	Eve	Choice Breakout TV Star	Nominated
2004	Eve	Choice TV Actress	Nominated
2005	"Rich Girl"	Choice Breakout	Won
2005	"Rich Girl"	Best Female Video	Nominated
2005	"Rich Girl"	Visionary Award	Won
2005	"Rich Girl"	Choice Collaboration	Won
2005	Eve	Choice TV Actress	Nominated

== VH1 ==
=== My VH1 Music Awards ===
Year	Nominee / work	Award	Result
2001	"What's Going On"	There's No "I" in Team (Best Collaboration)	Won
2001	"Let Me Blow Ya Mind"	There's No "I" in Team (Best Collaboration)	Nominated

=== VH1 Vogue Fashion Awards ===
Year	Nominee / work	Award	Result
2002	Herself	Breakthrough Style Award	Won
