= Speechless (Alicia Keys song) =

Song by Alicia Keys featuring Eve

from the album Monster Mondays Vol. 1
- Released: December 27, 2010
- Recorded: 2010
- Genre: R&B, hip hop
- Length: 4:07
- Label: J
- Songwriters: Alicia Keys, Kassim Dean, Eve Jeffers
- Producer: Swizz Beatz

"Speechless" is a song by American singer-songwriter Alicia Keys, featuring additional vocals from American rapper Eve. It was written by Keys, Eve and Swizz Beatz, and produced by the latter. It samples Kanye West’s 2010 song “Devil in a New Dress”. A dedication to her son Egypt, whom she gave birth to in October 2010, the freestyle collaboration was released as a holiday gift for Keys's fans on Beatz's Monster Mondays program on December 27, 2010. Swizz Beatz later included the song on his mixtape Monster Mondays Vol. 1 (2011). The song charted at number 71 on the US Billboard Hot R&B/Hip-Hop Songs chart in early 2011.

== Background ==
On October 14, 2010, Keys gave birth to her first son Egypt Daoud Dean, in New York City. That month, the singer revealed on her official blog that motherhood and her son had inspired her to create a song in a post titled "I feel a song coming on." On December 27, 2010, Beatz debuted "Speechless" on his website as part of his Monster Mondays program. In a behind-the-scenes video which documented the recording process and was also posted on the site, Beatz said that the song would not be included on her upcoming album and it was just a fun little gift to Keys' fans. "This should be a treat for the fans [...] almost like a day in the life", he said. Keys noted on Twitter that "Speechless" was just "a little freestyle treat" for the holidays, writing "It’s not a new album, not a single, it's something special for you!”

== Composition and lyrics ==
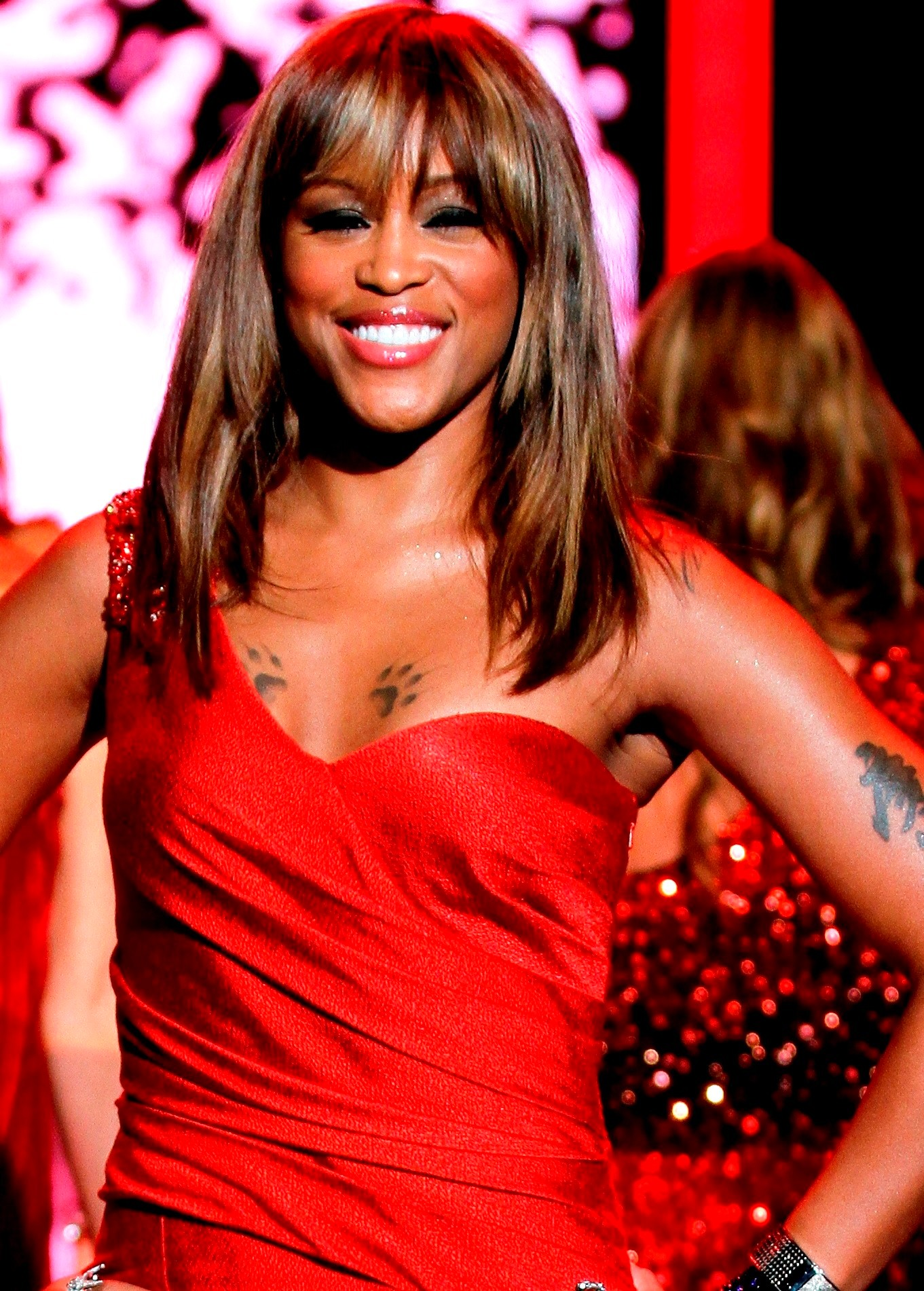
"Speechless" marked Keys' first reunion with rapper Eve since 2002's "Gangsta Lovin'".

"Speechless" samples elements from Kanye West’s “Devil in a New Dress” featuring Rick Ross. The song appears on his 2010 album My Beautiful Dark Twisted Fantasy. Lyrically, "Speechless" finds Keys singing about her newborn son. "I'm at a brand-new time in my life and a brand new feeling, and it's like this little guy, man, he takes my breath away," she says on the track before starting the first verse. Midway through the track, the rapper Eve makes an appearance. According to Jocelyn Vena of MTV News, "the piano-heavy tune gets funky once the chorus kicks in", on which Keys expresses her joy over the new love of her life, singing, "Makes you speechless, baby/ Don't know what to say/ I'm just speechless, baby/ The poet in me has gone away." Vena found that Eve "shows her soft side, spitting rhymes like, "In the morning when I rise up/ Go to the window and I smile, put my eyes up/ Stare in the clouds, like, 'Wow, look at my luck.'" "Speechless" marked the pairs' first collaboration in over eight years, having previously appeared together on Eve's 2002 single "Gangsta Lovin'" from her album Eve-Olution.

== Reception ==
Idolator found that Keys "may have rushed it out — ”Speechless” comes off as a little generic, despite surely heartfelt lyrics and the rock-guitar fuzz under Alicia’s piano. And the verse from the typically tough-talking Eve doesn’t add much." Jocelyn Vena of MTV News said, "the piano-heavy tune gets funky once the chorus kicks in", on which Keys expresses her joy over the new love of her son, and in her verse Eve "shows her soft side".

== Charts ==
Chart (2011)	Peak position
US Hot R&B/Hip-Hop Songs (Billboard)	71
