= Satisfaction (Eve song) =

2003 single by Eve

Single by Eve

from the album Eve-Olution
- Released: February 25, 2003
- Studio: Encore Studios (Burbank, CA)
- Length: 4:18
- Label: Ruff Ryders; Interscope
- Songwriters: Eve Jeffers; Andre Young; Michael Elizondo
- Producers: Dr. Dre; Mike Elizondo

Eve singles chronology
"Get Up" (2003)	"Satisfaction" (2003)	"Not Today" (2004)

"Satisfaction" is a hip-hop song by American rapper-songwriter Eve, released on February 25, 2003, as the second and final single from the album, Eve-Olution (2002). Co-produced by Dr. Dre and his then-protégé Mike Elizondo, it was one of the last songs that Eve added to the final track listing of her album.

The song was moderately successful in the United States, reaching number 27 and 22 on the Billboard Hot 100 and R&B/Hip-Hop Songs chart, respectively. It was less commercially successful outside of the US, peaking at number 87 in the Netherlands, number 60 in France and number 50 in Belgium (Flanders). However, the single did fare better in the United Kingdom, where it debuted at and peaked at number 20. It received favorable reviews from most music critics and a nomination for Best Female Rap Solo Performance at the 45th Annual Grammy Awards. However, it lost to Missy Elliott's "Scream." The music video for the song was filmed in her home-state of Pennsylvania.

== Background ==
"Satisfaction" was one of the last songs that Eve added to the album. About the recording of the song, Eve told MTV, "I actually was getting ready to walk out the studio. I had a headache, I was stressed out. I just was like ... working with Dre ... me and Dre got this love/hate relationship. Every time I write a song [for him], it's the hardest song I wrote. Like 'Blow Your Mind'; it just was drama." The song was originally recorded for Scorpion, but however, did not make the album because she already had two songs produced by Dr. Dre. She said, "We decided to put it on this album and it fit in perfectly." Eve said that Dre made her redo her bars as many times as everybody else: “For me, it was the word ‘block’ on ‘Satisfaction’”, Eve almost shudders. “I was like, I’m saying ‘block’. I can hear myself saying it. Everybody else can hear it. And he was like, ‘You’re not saying it the way I need you to say it’. And as soon as I got it, I heard what he heard. And that’s what makes him great. Because it was so simple but so pivotal to how this next part worked. I was like, “How the hell did you hear that?’ But yeah, I think I did it 25 times”.

== Critical reception ==
Entertainment Weekly writer, Marc Weingarten, compared the song to "Let Me Blow Ya Mind", and characterized the song as "a three-note bass riff and a slow-drip beat, Eve raps for her right to party [...] and creates a starkly evocative successor to her breakout single." Sal Cinquemani of Slant Magazine expressed that the "rhythmes are sexy" and the "rhymes are slick". The Village Voice described it as a "Salt-n-Pepa style" song. The song received a nomination for Best Female Rap Solo Performance at the 45th Annual Grammy Awards, but lost to "Scream" by Missy Elliott.

== Chart performance ==
"Satisfaction" was the most commercially successful in the United States. It peaked at number 22 on the US R&B/Hip-Hop Songs chart and number 27 on the US Billboard Hot 100. The song saw similar success in the United Kingdom, debuting and peaking at number 20 on the UK Singles Chart in April 2003, leaving the charts after its fourth week. In France, the song was less successful. It debuted in early March 2003 at number 69, climbing up nine positions the following week. After that, it went down the chart, exiting it in mid April. The song was a commercial failure in the Netherlands, landing on the chart at number 87 and dropping off the next week.

== Music video ==
The music video for "Satisfaction" was produced by Phillipa Davis and directed by Nzingha Stewart. It first aired on the week of October 21, 2002. The video starts with Eve standing out in a crowd of people, in front of a car while she raps the first verse. During the second verse, Eve is shown sitting on bleachers within another crowd of people while a basketball game goes on. During the final verse, she's shown rapping in yet another crowd of people dancing at a house party. Throughout, the clip intercuts with scenes of inclined people, Eve jumping rope with kids, and people dancing. The video also features verses from "Double R What" at the end. The music video was filmed in Philadelphia.

== Track listing ==
Maxi single
No.	Title	Writer(s)	Producer(s)	Length
1.	"Satisfaction"	Jeffers; Young; Elizondo	Dr. Dre; Elizondo	3:58
2.	"Heaven Only Knows"	Jeffers; Michael Gomez	Shok	4:29
3.	"Satisfaction" (Instrumental)	Jeffers; Young; Elizondo	Dr. Dre; Elizondo	3:58
4.	"Satisfaction" (Video)

CD single
No.	Title	Writer(s)	Producer(s)	Length
1.	"Satisfaction"	Eve Jeffers; Andre Young; Michael Elizondo	Dr. Dre; Elizondo	3:58
2.	"Love is Blind"	Jeffers; Kasseem Dean; Anthony Fields	Swizz Beatz	4:20

== Personnel ==
Credits lifted from the liner notes of Eve-Olution.

- Eve – vocals, songwriting
- Dr. Dre – producer, mixing, songwriting
- Mike Elizondo – producer, guitar, bass, keyboards, songwriting
- Tracie Spencer – background vocals

== Charts ==
=== Weekly charts ===
Chart (2003)	Peak position
Belgium (Ultratop 50 Flanders)	50
Belgium (Ultratip Bubbling Under Wallonia)	5
France (SNEP)	60
Germany (GfK)	68
Ireland (IRMA)	36
Netherlands (Single Top 100)	87
Scotland Singles (Official Charts)	32
UK Singles (Official Charts)	20
UK Hip Hop/R&B (Official Charts)	4
US Billboard Hot 100	27
US Hot R&B/Hip-Hop Songs (Billboard)	22
US Rhythmic Airplay (Billboard)	9

=== Year-end charts ===
Chart (2003)	Position
UK Urban (Music Week)	10
US Hot R&B/Hip-Hop Songs (Billboard)	86

== Release history ==
List of release dates, formats and record labels
Region	Date	Format(s)	Label(s)	Ref(s).
France	February 25, 2003	CD single	Interscope; Ruff Ryders	
United Kingdom	March 31, 2003	CD single; maxi single	Interscope	
Canada	April 15, 2003	Maxi single	Universal International	
