= Love Is Blind (Eve song) =

1999 single by Eve

Single by Eve

from the album Let There Be Eve...Ruff Ryders' First Lady
- Released: December 9, 1999
- Studio: Enterprise Studio; Powerhouse Studio
- Genre: Conscious hip hop
- Length: 4:20
- Label: Ruff Ryders; Interscope
- Songwriters: Eve Jeffers; Kasseem Dean; Anthony Fields • Shari Watson
- Producers: Swizz Beatz; P. Killer Trackz

Eve singles chronology
"Triflin'" (1999)	"Love Is Blind" (1999)	"Recognize" (2000)

Faith Evans singles chronology
"Lately I" (1999)	"Love Is Blind" (1999)	"Can't Believe" (2001)

"Love Is Blind" is a song by American rapper Eve, released on December 9, 1999 as the third single from her debut studio album Let There Be Eve...Ruff Ryders' First Lady (1999). The song is directed toward a man who had been abusing Eve's best friend.

In 2001, the official remix featuring American singer Faith Evans was released from Eve's second studio album Scorpion.

== Background ==
When Eve and her best friend Andrea were in high school, Andrea was in love with a man, with whom she became pregnant. The man had become increasingly abusive toward Andrea, culminating in him severely injuring her in a case of domestic violence. It led Eve to write the song, in which she recounts the abuse and raps to the man who was responsible: "I don't even know you and I'd kill you myself / You played with her like a doll and put her back on the shelf / Wouldn't let her go to school and better herself / She had a baby by your ass and you ain't giving no help". The last verse of the song tells a fictional story in which Eve's friend has been killed by her partner and Eve exacts revenge by shooting and killing the abuser.

== Critical reception ==
The song received mostly positive reviews from critics. Richard Harrington of The Washington Post and Jeff Nieser of Miami New Times both regarded it as the best track from Let There Be Eve, while Greg Tate of Rolling Stone called it "bold" and "smart". A Dayton, Ohio radio programmer also praised the overall message of the song, but questioned the ending: "She shoots the guy. I mean, what is that saying to kids? That revenge is the answer?"

== Music video ==
The official music video for "Love Is Blind" was directed by Dave Meyers. It depicts a man attacking a woman repeatedly and in front of their children, and the eventual death of the mother.

== Charts ==
Chart (1999–2000)	Peak position
US Billboard Hot 100	34
US Hot R&B/Hip-Hop Songs (Billboard)	11
US Hot Rap Songs (Billboard)	1
US Rhythmic Airplay (Billboard)	11
