= Get Up (Nate Dogg song) =

Single by Nate Dogg featuring Eve

from the album Nate Dogg
- Released: February 4, 2003
- Genre: Hip-hop, R&B
- Length: 3:50
- Label: Elektra
- Songwriters: David Blake, Eve Jeffers, Nathaniel Hale
- Producer: DJ Quik

Nate Dogg singles chronology
"The Streets" (2002)	"Get Up" (2003)	"21 Questions" (2003)

Eve singles chronology
"Gangsta Lovin'" (2002)	"Get Up" (2003)	"Satisfaction" (2003)

"Get Up" is a hip-hop song by American recording artist Nate Dogg, released as the first single from his third self-titled studio album Nate Dogg (2003). The song features additional vocals from American rapper Eve and the song is produced by DJ Quik.

== Track listings ==
CD single

1. "Get Up" (Amended Version) (featuring Eve) – 3:50
2. "Get Up" (Original Version) (featuring Eve) – 3:50
3. "Get Up" (Amended W/o Rap) – 3:50
4. "Get Up" (Instrumental) – 3:50
5. "Get Up" (TV Track) – 3:50
6. "Get Up" (Acapella) (featuring Eve) – 3:47

== Charts ==
Chart (2003)	Peak position
US Hot R&B/Hip-Hop Songs (Billboard)	81
US Rhythmic Airplay (Billboard)	39

== Release history ==
Region	Date	Format(s)	Label(s)	Ref.
United States	November 25, 2002	Rhythmic contemporary · urban contemporary radio	Elektra	
