= Rise (Shaggy album) =

Studio album by Shaggy
- Released: September 28, 2012
- Recorded: 2009–2012
- Genre: Reggae, dancehall, dance, hip hop
- Length: 53:48
- Label: Ranch Entertainment, Embassy of Music, Warner
- Producer: Orville Burrell, Andreas Litterscheid, Teflon, Alex Wende, Lars Bendix Buysen

Shaggy chronology
| Summer in Kingston (2011) | Rise (2012) | SMIX - Mr. Lover Collection (2014) |

Singles from Rise
- 1. "Fly High" Released: June 5, 2009; 2. "Fired Up (Fuck the Rece$$ion!)" Released: March 8, 2011; 3. "Sugarcane" Released: July 16, 2011; 4. "Dame" Released: February 8, 2012; 5. "World Citizen" Released: May 4, 2012; 6. "Girls Just Want to Have Fun" Released: August 24, 2012

Rise is the eleventh studio album released by Jamaican dancehall artist Shaggy, released on September 28, 2012, in European territories such as Germany, Austria and Switzerland. The album was not released in the United States; however it did receive a limited digital release in the United Kingdom, without physical release.

The album is the European-equivalent of his tenth studio album, Summer in Kingston, containing nine of the ten tracks from that album, packaged alongside the new singles "World Citizen" featuring Jahcoustix and "Girls Just Want to Have Fun", featuring Eve, as well as three new tracks, and the European hit single "Fly High" featuring Gary "Nesta" Pine, which despite being released in 2009, had not previously appeared on any of Shaggy's albums.

== Background ==
Following the release of Summer in Kingston, Shaggy returned to the studio to continue recording his collaborative album with Sly & Robbie. However, prior to the album's release, Shaggy released a brand new single to the European market, "World Citizen", featuring singer-songwriter Jahcoustix, which was recorded aside from the Sly & Robbie project. Following the single's success, the decision was made to repackage Summer in Kingston, which had never before been released in Europe, and release it for the first time in the region alongside a select amount of new material. The Sly & Robbie track "She Gives Me Love" from Summer in Kingston is the only track omitted from the re-package, due to the fact it will appear on Shaggy's next worldwide release.

A month prior to the album's release, the official lead single, "Girls Just Want to Have Fun", a re-interpretation of the Cyndi Lauper original, featuring singer Eve, was released in Europe to chart success, followed by the album's release on September 28, 2012. The album's three new tracks, "Rise", "Diva" and "Get Back My Baby", were all recorded just weeks prior to the album's release.

== Track listing ==
| No. | Title | Writer(s) | Producer(s) | Length |
|---|---|---|---|---|
| 1. | "Rise" | Orville Burrell, Andreas Litterscheid, Reinhard Raith | Andreas Litterscheid | 3:11 |
| 2. | "Girls Just Want to Have Fun" (featuring Eve) | Orville Burrell, Robert Hazard | Andreas Litterscheid, Teflon | 3:41 |
| 3. | "Dame" (featuring Kat Deluna) | Orville Burrell, Andre Fennell, Costi Ioniță, Dimitriu Aurelian, Monica Radu | Shaggy | 3:28 |
| 4. | "Fired Up (Fuck the Rece$$ion!)" (featuring Pitbull) | Orville Burrell, Andre Fennell, Costi Ioniță, Armando C. Perez | Shaggy | 3:18 |
| 5. | "Diva" | Orville Burrell, Daniel Geister, Reinhard Raith, Daniel Schmuck, Martin Skibba | Andreas Litterscheid | 3:05 |
| 6. | "World Citizen" (featuring Jahcoustix) | Orville Burrell, Lars Bendix Buysen, Dominik Haas | Alex Wende, Lars Bendix Buysen | 3:01 |
| 7. | "Feeling Alive" (featuring Agent Sasco) | Orville Burrell, Alzi Mazin, Agent Sasco, Djamel Fezari, Kore | Shaggy | 3:23 |
| 8. | "Just Another Girl" (featuring Tarrus Riley) | Orville Burrell, Rand Ralph Van Rheenen, Tarrus Riley, Teflon, Sheldon M. Harris | Teflon, Shaggy | 2:56 |
| 9. | "Sugarcane" | Orville Burrell, Andre Fennell, Teflon, Sheldon M. Harris | Teflon, Shaggy | 3:27 |
| 10. | "End of the World (Drink Up)" | Orville Burrell, Andre Fennell, Teflon, Sheldon M. Harris | Teflon, Shaggy | 3:10 |
| 11. | "The Only One (Lie to Me)" (featuring Jaiden) | Orville Burrell, Andre Fennell, Andrew Bassford, Jaiden, Shaun Pizzonia | Shaggy | 4:36 |
| 12. | "Soldiers Story" (featuring Jaiden) | Orville Burrell, James Roston, Ricardo Ducent, Shaun Pizzonia | Shaggy | 3:47 |
| 13. | "Hurting" | Orville Burrell, Andre Fennell, Robin Browne, Shaun Pizzonia | Shaggy | 3:49 |
| 14. | "Get Back My Baby" | Orville Burrell, Alan Ett | Shaggy | 3:57 |
| 15. | "Fly High" (featuring Gary "Nesta" Pine) | Orville Burrell, Marc Jackson | Andreas Litterscheid | 3:50 |
