= Who's That Girl? (Eve song) =

2001 single by Eve

Single by Eve

from the album Scorpion
- B-side: "What Ya Want"; "Gotta Man"
- Released: February 5, 2001
- Studio: The Hit Factory (New York City)
- Genre: Hip hop
- Length: 4:42
- Label: Ruff Ryders; Interscope
- Songwriters: Eve Jeffers; Sheldon Harris; Darrin Dean; Jay Jackson
- Producer: Teflon

Eve singles chronology
"Got It All" (2000)	"Who's That Girl?" (2001)	"Let Me Blow Ya Mind" (2001)

"Who's That Girl?" is a song by American rapper Eve from her second studio album Scorpion (2001). It was released as her fifth US single in February 2001 and as her debut single in Europe. The song peaked at number 47 on the US Billboard Hot 100 and number six in the United Kingdom. VH1 ranked it at number 97 on their "100 Greatest Songs of Hip Hop" list.

== Track listings ==
US 12-inch single

A1. "Who's That Girl?" (main pass) – 4:42
A2. "Who's That Girl?" (main pass radio edit) – 3:31
A3. "Who's That Girl?" (main pass street mix) – 4:18
B1. "Who's That Girl?" (main pass street mix radio edit) – 3:44
B2. "Who's That Girl?" (instrumental) – 4:41

UK CD single

1. "Who's That Girl?" (main pass) – 4:42
2. "What Ya Want" (featuring Nokio) – 4:21
3. "Who's That Girl?" (C.L.A.S. remix) – 4:28
4. "Who's That Girl?" (CD-ROM video)

UK 12-inch single

A1. "Who's That Girl?" (main pass) – 4:42
A2. "Who's That Girl?" (instrumental) – 4:41
B1. "What Ya Want" (featuring Nokio) – 4:21

UK cassette single

1. "Who's That Girl?" (main pass) – 4:42
2. "What Ya Want" (featuring Nokio) – 4:21

European CD single

1. "Who's That Girl?" (album version)
2. "Who's That Girl?" (C.L.A.S. remix)

European maxi-CD single

1. "Who's That Girl?" (album version)
2. "Who's That Girl?" (C.L.A.S. remix)
3. "Gotta Man"
4. "Who's That Girl?" (street mix without horns) – 4:18
5. "Who's That Girl?" (video)

== Charts ==
=== Weekly charts ===
Chart (2001)	Peak position
Belgium (Ultratop 50 Flanders)	42
Belgium (Ultratop 50 Wallonia)	15
Denmark (Tracklisten)	10
Europe (Eurochart Hot 100)	14
France (SNEP)	17
Germany (GfK)	21
Ireland (IRMA)	34
Italy (FIMI)	46
Netherlands (Dutch Top 40)	16
Netherlands (Single Top 100)	17
Norway (VG-lista)	14
Scotland Singles (OCC)	21
Sweden (Sverigetopplistan)	29
Switzerland (Schweizer Hitparade)	8
UK Singles (OCC)	6
UK Dance (OCC)	6
UK Hip Hop/R&B (OCC)	3
US Billboard Hot 100	47
US Hot R&B/Hip-Hop Songs (Billboard)	16
US Rhythmic Airplay (Billboard)	12

=== Year-end charts ===
Chart (2001)	Position
Belgium (Ultratop 50 Wallonia)	79
Europe (Eurochart Hot 100)	93
France (SNEP)	79
Netherlands (Dutch Top 40)	93
Switzerland (Schweizer Hitparade)	40
UK Singles (OCC)	153
UK Urban (Music Week)	11
US Hot R&B/Hip-Hop Singles & Tracks (Billboard)	78
US Rhythmic Top 40 (Billboard)	58

== Certifications ==
Region	Certification	Certified units/sales
New Zealand (RMNZ)	Platinum	30,000^{‡}
United Kingdom (BPI)	Gold	400,000^{‡}
United States (RIAA)	Gold	500,000^{‡}
^{‡} Sales+streaming figures based on certification alone.

== Release history ==
Region	Date	Format(s)	Label(s)	Ref.
United States	February 5, 2001	Rhythmic contemporary; urban radio	Ruff Ryders; Interscope	
United Kingdom	May 7, 2001	12-inch vinyl; CD; cassette	Ruff Ryders; Interscope	
