= Let There Be Eve...Ruff Ryders' First Lady =

Studio album by Eve
- Released: September 14, 1999
- Recorded: 1996–1999
- Studio: Powerhouse Studio
- Genre: East Coast hip-hop; gangsta rap
- Length: 57:09
- Label: Ruff Ryders; Interscope
- Producer: Swizz Beatz; P.K.; DJ Shok; Jay "Icepick" Jackson

Eve chronology
| Let There Be Eve...Ruff Ryders' First Lady (1999) | Scorpion (2001) |

Singles from Let There Be Eve...Ruff Ryders' First Lady
- 1. "What Y'all Want" Released: June 1999; 2. "Gotta Man" Released: August 31, 1999; 3. "Love Is Blind" Released: December 9, 1999

Let There Be Eve...Ruff Ryders' First Lady is the debut studio album by American rapper Eve. It was released by Ruff Ryders Entertainment and Interscope Records on September 14, 1999. All of the songs on the album were written by Eve herself. It sold over 200,000 copies in the first week. The album has sold over 2 million copies and was certified Double Platinum by the Recording Industry Association of America. The album features singles such as "Gotta Man", and "Love Is Blind" with Faith Evans. Eve became the third female hip-hop artist to have her album peak at number-one on the Billboard 200 (Lauryn Hill's debut album, The Miseducation of Lauryn Hill, being the first to top the chart in 1998 and Foxy Brown's second album, Chyna Doll achieving the feat earlier in 1999).

== Critical reception ==
Professional ratings
Review scores
| Source | Rating |
|---|---|
| AllMusic | 4/5 stars |
| Robert Christgau | (2-star Honorable Mention) |
| Entertainment Weekly | C+ |
| Muzik | 4/5 stars |
| NME | 7/10 |
| Pitchfork | 8.1/10 |
| Q | 4/5 stars |
| Rolling Stone | 3.5/5 stars |
| The Source | 3.5/5 stars |

AllMusic editor Theresa E. LaVeck found that "Eve's conviction and passion make her noticeable no matter what the subject, but she truly stands out when the stories become personal, examining the cost of the hard life she champions in other songs. "Love Is Blind" is a painful look at domestic violence. Self-respect and positivity are the moral of "Heaven Only Knows." Both tracks are backed by beautiful arrangements with acoustic guitar and lush vocals. Eve maintains her hardcore image in these tracks, but with a subtle vulnerability that promise lots of interesting things to come from this Philly prodigy."

== Track listing ==
Let There Be Eve...Ruff Ryders' First Lady track listing
| No. | Title | Writer(s) | Producer(s) | Length |
|---|---|---|---|---|
| 1. | "First Lady" (Intro) | Kasseem Dean | Swizz Beatz | 1:36 |
| 2. | "Let's Talk About" (featuring Drag-On) | Eve Jeffers; Melvin Smalls; Darrin Dean; K. Dean | Swizz Beatz | 3:31 |
| 3. | "Gotta Man" (featuring Mashonda) | E. Jeffers; K. Dean | Swizz Beatz | 4:24 |
| 4. | "Philly Cheese Steak" (Skit) (featuring Swizz, Eric and Fuquan) | | Swizz Beatz | 1:37 |
| 5. | "Philly Philly" (featuring Beanie Sigel) | E. Jeffers; Dwight Grant; J. Dean; K. Dean | Swizz Beatz | 3:57 |
| 6. | "Stuck Up" (featuring C.J.) | E. Jeffers; George Cantres; D. Dean; K. Dean | Swizz Beatz | 3:53 |
| 7. | "Ain't Got No Dough" (featuring Missy Elliott) | E. Jeffers; Melissa Elliott; K. Dean | Swizz Beatz | 4:17 |
| 8. | "BM" (Skit) | | Icepick | 1:01 |
| 9. | "Love Is Blind" (featuring Faith Evans) | E. Jeffers; Anthony Fields; K. Dean | Swizz Beatz | 4:20 |
| 10. | "Scenario 2000" (featuring DMX, The Lox and Drag-On) | E. Jeffers; Earl Simmons; M. Smalls; David Styles; Jason Phillips; Sean Jacobs; K. Dean | Swizz Beatz | 3:50 |
| 11. | "Dog Match" (featuring DMX) | E. Jeffers; E. Simmons; K. Dean | Swizz Beatz | 4:19 |
| 12. | "My Bitches" (Skit) | Jay Jackson; D. Dean; E. Simmons; K. Dean | Swizz Beatz | 1:08 |
| 13. | "We On That Shit!" (featuring P. Killer Trackz) | E. Jeffers; A. Fields; D. Dean; K. Dean | P.K. | 3:25 |
| 14. | "Chokie Nikes" (Skit) (featuring Diona, Eric and Grimy) | | Icepick | 1:04 |
| 15. | "Maniac" (featuring Swizz Beatz) | E. Jeffers; D. Dean; K. Dean | Swizz Beatz | 4:22 |
| 16. | "My Enemies" (Skit) | E. Jeffers; K. Dean | Swizz Beatz | 1:43 |
| 17. | "Heaven Only Knows" | E. Jeffers; Michael Gomez | Shok | 4:29 |
| 18. | "What Y'all Want" (Remix) (bonus track) | E. Jeffers; K. Dean; M. Gomez | Shok | 4:05 |
| Total length: | | | | 57:09 |

== Personnel ==
Credits for Let There Be Eve...Ruff Ryders' First Lady adapted from AllMusic.

- Adam "Bunnie" Grossman – engineer
- Adam Gazzola – instrumentation
- Charles Duffy – art direction, design
- Chris Theis – engineer
- Dee Dean – executive producer
- DMX – performer
- Eric – performer
- Eric Smith – engineer
- Eve – vocals
- The Icepick – producer
- Jonathan Mannion – photography
- Kithe Brewster – stylist
- Mario DeArce – editing
- P.K – producer
- Rich Keller – multi Instruments, mixing, instrumentation
- Ron Martinez – vocals
- Shok – producer
- Swizz Beatz – producer, associate producer
- Taryn Simon – photography
- Tony Dawsey – mastering
- Tony Maserati – mixing
- Waah – executive producer, art direction, design

== Charts ==
=== Weekly charts ===
Weekly chart performance for Let There Be Eve...Ruff Ryders' First Lady
| Chart (1999) | Peak position |
|---|---|
| Canadian Albums (Billboard) | 16 |
| Canadian R&B Albums (Nielsen SoundScan) | 1 |
| US Billboard 200 | 1 |
| US Top R&B/Hip-Hop Albums (Billboard) | 1 |

=== Year-end charts ===
1999 Year-end chart performance for Let There Be Eve...Ruff Ryders' First Lady
| Chart (1999) | Position |
|---|---|
| US Billboard 200 | 96 |
| US Top R&B/Hip-Hop Albums (Billboard) | 31 |

2000 Year-end chart performance for Let There Be Eve...Ruff Ryders' First Lady
| Chart (2000) | Position |
|---|---|
| US Billboard 200 | 91 |
| US Top R&B/Hip-Hop Albums (Billboard) | 43 |

== Certifications ==
Certifications for Let There Be Eve...Ruff Ryders' First Lady
| Region | Certification | Certified units/sales |
|---|---|---|
| Canada (Music Canada) | Gold | 50,000^{^} |
| United States (RIAA) | 2× Platinum | 2,000,000 |
^{^} Shipments figures based on certification alone.

== See also ==
- List of number-one albums of 1999 (U.S.)
- List of number-one R&B albums of 1999 (U.S.)
