= Gangsta Lovin' =

2002 single by Eve

Single by Eve featuring Alicia Keys

from the album Eve-Olution
- B-side: "Satisfaction" (snippet); "Party in the Rain (snippet); "Double R What" (snippet); "Neckbones" (snippet); "U Me & She"
- Released: July 1, 2002
- Studio: The Hit Factory (New York City)
- Length: 3:59
- Label: Ruff Ryders; Interscope
- Songwriters: Alisa Yarbrough; Jonah Ellis; Lonnie Simmons; Eve Jeffers
- Producers: Irv Gotti; Channel 7

Eve singles chronology
"4 My People" (2002)	"Gangsta Lovin'" (2002)	"Get Up" (2003)

Alicia Keys singles chronology
"How Come You Don't Call Me" (2002)	"Gangsta Lovin'" (2002)	"Girlfriend" (2002)

Music video
- "Gangsta Lovin'" on YouTube

"Gangsta Lovin'" is the lead single from Eve's third studio album, Eve-Olution (2002). The song features R&B-soul singer Alicia Keys. Released in July 2002, "Gangsta Lovin'" became Eve's second consecutive number-two hit on the Billboard Hot 100 as well as her third consecutive top-10 hit in the United Kingdom.

When being asked in an interview why she chose Keys to be on the song, Eve said, "I love Alicia, I mean I think she's incredibly talented, and I needed a girl on the song, and why not Alicia Keys?". The chorus contains re-sung elements from Yarbrough and Peoples' 1981 song "Don't Stop the Music", which were also used on Common's 1997 song "All Night Long" featuring Erykah Badu.

== Music video ==
The video for "Gangsta Lovin'", directed by Little X, starts with girls putting food on their plates from a buffet table with shirts on that say "Eve", "&", "Alicia", "In", and "Gangsta Love". It then goes to a swimming pool where Eve and Alicia Keys are sitting in beach chairs. Eve is glancing at a man she is clearly interested in. The video then switches off showing the pool scene, a scene in a room where Eve is rapping by herself, and a room where Keys is singing by herself. For the second verse, Eve walks into a party where the man she is interested in is. The man catches Eve's eye, and they smile at each other. In the chorus, it shows them talking and exchanging phone numbers. At the beginning of the third verse, Keys and Eve are in the same room. The man is shown calling Eve, and Eve goes to the beach and sits down with him. Keys stands at the beach singing by herself. Eve and the man walk down the beach together. At the end, Eve and Keys are shown wearing "Gangsta Love" shirts.

== Track listings ==
US CD and 12-inch single

1. "Gangsta Lovin'" (featuring Alicia Keys)
2. "Satisfaction" (snippet)
3. "Party in the Rain (snippet featuring Mashonda)
4. "Double R What" (snippet featuring Jadakiss and Styles)
5. "Neckbones" (snippet)

Australasian CD single

1. "Gangsta Lovin'" (featuring Alicia Keys) – 3:59
2. "U Me & She" – 3:52
3. "Let Me Blow Ya Mind" (Stargate remix featuring Gwen Stefani) – 3:33
4. "Who's That Girl?" (instrumental) – 4:41

European CD single

1. "Gangsta Lovin'" (featuring Alicia Keys) – 3:59
2. "U Me & She" – 3:52

UK CD and cassette single

1. "Gangsta Lovin'" (featuring Alicia Keys) – 4:01
2. "Who's That Girl?" – 4:41
3. "Gangsta Lovin'" (instrumental) – 4:00

UK 12-inch single

A1. "Gangsta Lovin'" (featuring Alicia Keys) – 4:01
A2. "Gangsta Lovin'" (instrumental) – 4:00
B1. "Who's That Girl?" – 4:41

== Charts ==
=== Weekly charts ===
Chart (2002)	Peak position
Australia (ARIA)	4
Australian Urban (ARIA)	1
Austria (Ö3 Austria Top 40)	41
Belgium (Ultratop 50 Flanders)	18
Belgium (Ultratop 50 Wallonia)	13
Denmark (Tracklisten)	13
Europe (Eurochart Hot 100)	7
Finland (Suomen virallinen lista)	6
France (SNEP)	20
Germany (GfK)	21
Hungary (Single Top 40)	10
Ireland (IRMA)	15
Italy (FIMI)	14
Netherlands (Dutch Top 40)	8
Netherlands (Single Top 100)	8
New Zealand (Recorded Music NZ)	7
Norway (VG-lista)	5
Romania (Romanian Top 100)	93
Scottish Singles Sales (Official Charts)	11
Sweden (Sverigetopplistan)	10
Switzerland (Schweizer Hitparade)	6
UK Singles (Official Charts)	6
UK Hip Hop/R&B (Official Charts)	1
US Billboard Hot 100	2
US Hot R&B/Hip-Hop Songs (Billboard)	2
US Hot Rap Songs (Billboard)	2
US Pop Airplay (Billboard)	2
US Rhythmic Airplay (Billboard)	2

=== Year-end charts ===
Chart (2002)	Position
Australia (ARIA)	40
Australian Urban (ARIA)	16
Belgium (Ultratop 50 Wallonia)	87
Europe (Eurochart Hot 100)	84
Netherlands (Dutch Top 40)	70
Netherlands (Single Top 100)	89
Switzerland (Schweizer Hitparade)	67
UK Singles (OCC)	128
UK Urban (Music Week)	13
US Billboard Hot 100	19
US Hot R&B/Hip-Hop Singles & Tracks (Billboard)	28
US Hot Rap Songs (Billboard)	9

== Certifications ==
Region	Certification	Certified units/sales
Australia (ARIA)	Platinum	70,000^{^}
New Zealand (RMNZ)	Platinum	30,000^{‡}
United Kingdom (BPI)	Silver	200,000^{‡}
^{^} Shipments figures based on certification alone.^{‡} Sales+streaming figures based on certification alone.

== Release history ==
Region	Date	Format(s)	Label(s)	Ref(s).
United States	July 1, 2002	Rhythmic contemporary radio	Ruff Ryders; Interscope	
United States	July 8, 2002	Contemporary hit; urban radio	Ruff Ryders; Interscope	
Australia	September 23, 2002	CD	Ruff Ryders; Interscope	
United Kingdom	September 23, 2002	12-inch vinyl; CD; cassette	Ruff Ryders; Interscope	
