= Tambourine (song) =

Single by Eve featuring Swizz Beatz

from the album Lip Lock (intended)
- B-side: "Dance Floor" (featuring Mashonda)
- Released: April 17, 2007
- Genre: Hip hop
- Length: 3:12
- Label: Aftermath; Full Surface; Geffen
- Songwriters: E. Jeffers, K. Dean, S. Garrett
- Producer: Swizz Beatz

Eve singles chronology
"Like This" (2007)	"Tambourine" (2007)	"Give It to You" (2007)

Alternative cover
- The cover for the UK CD and vinyl editions of "Tambourine"

"Tambourine" is a hip hop song by American rapper Eve, released as a single in 2007 and becoming Eve's first charting single as a lead performer in over four years. Written by herself, Sean Garrett, and Swizz Beatz, and produced by the latter, the song samples the 1974 song, "Blow Your Whistle" by The Soul Searchers. In the week of April 19, 2007, the song debuted at number 73 on the Billboard Hot R&B/Hip-Hop Songs chart, where it continued to gain momentum.

In the United Kingdom, "Tambourine" debuted at number 38, two weeks before the song's physical release. The song peaked at number 18 in the country and was her fifth consecutive top twenty solo hit in the UK. The B-side to "Tambourine" is "Dancefloor" featuring Mashonda. The song features uncredited vocals by the song's producer Swizz Beatz (he is not credited as a featured performer). The song was number 68 on Rolling Stone's list of the 100 Best Songs of 2007, and was also #70 on MTV Asia's list of Top 100 Hits of 2007.

== Music video ==
The music video directed by Melina Matsoukas premiered on the night of May 24, 2007, after Eve's episode of BET's Access Granted which featured the making of the video. Eve stated that she wanted the scenes in the video to be colorful. Swizz Beatz and Ya Boy make cameos in the video. The video starts off with four maids dancing and knocking on Eve's door. Upon entering, they begin to shower Eve with things, which she rejects, then they start dancing while imitating a tambourine. Then the video cuts to Eve tanning and getting ready for a party. Throughout the video, Swizz Beatz can be seen in passing. Then Eve gets into a car driven by Swizz Beatz, and they arrive at a party where there is dancing and a woman spitting out beer. The music video was nominated for Best Choreography at the 2007 MTV Video Music Awards.

== Usage in media ==
The track is featured in the movies Fantastic Four: Rise of the Silver Surfer, Meet the Spartans, The Boss, Trainwreck, Wild Child, Bride Wars, Big Mommas: Like Father, Like Son, in the television series Skins (season 3, episode 2), Gossip Girl (season 1, episode 4), Girls (season 2, episode 3) and the season four finale of Station 19, and in NBA Live 08. It is also featured in a commercial for Peloton. Later the song was featured in the South Korean reality show BOYS II PLANET as one of the teams mission, featuring a coreography made by contestant Yumeki Takenaka

== Remixes ==
The official remix features new verses by rappers Swizz Beatz, Missy Elliott, Fabolous, and Eve.

== Track listing ==
US vinyl:

1. "Tambourine" (clean)
2. "Tambourine" (dirty)
3. "Tambourine" (instrumental)
4. "Tambourine" (a cappella)

US vinyl:

1. "Tambourine" (Remix) (radio) (featuring Fabolous & Missy Elliott)
2. "Tambourine" (Remix) (instrumental)
3. "Tambourine" (Remix) (LP) (featuring Fabolous & Missy Elliott)

UK CD:

1. "Tambourine" (radio edit)
2. "Dance Floor" (featuring Mashonda)

UK vinyl:

1. "Tambourine" (radio edit)
2. "Tambourine" (album version)
3. "Tambourine" (instrumental)
4. "Dance Floor" (featuring Mashonda)

EU CD:

1. "Tambourine" (radio edit)
2. "Tambourine" (instrumental)
3. "Tambourine" (album version)
4. "Tambourine" (video)

== Charts ==
=== Weekly charts ===
Chart (2007)	Peak position
Belgium (Ultratip Bubbling Under Flanders)	16
Canada Hot 100 (Billboard)	49
Germany (GfK)	78
Hungary (Dance Top 40)	20
Ireland (IRMA)	16
Scottish Singles Sales (Official Charts)	21
UK Singles (Official Charts)	18
UK Hip Hop/R&B (Official Charts)	5
US Billboard Hot 100	37
US Hot R&B/Hip-Hop Songs (Billboard)	17
US Hot Rap Songs (Billboard)	10
US Pop 100 (Billboard)	46
US Rhythmic Airplay (Billboard)	38

=== Year-end charts ===
Chart (2007)	Position
UK Urban (Music Week)	3
US Hot R&B/Hip-Hop Songs (Billboard)	68

== Certifications ==
Region	Certification	Certified units/sales
New Zealand (RMNZ)	Platinum	30,000^{‡}
United Kingdom (BPI) sales + streams since 2011	Silver	200,000^{‡}
^{‡} Sales+streaming figures based on certification alone.
