= Girls Just Wanna Have Fun (Shaggy song) =

Single by Shaggy featuring Eve

from the album Rise
- B-side: "Remady Remix"
- Released: 24 August 2012
- Recorded: 2012
- Length: 3:41
- Label: Embassy of Music
- Songwriters: Orville Burrell, Robert Hazard
- Producers: Teflon, Reinhard Raith, Andreas Litterscheid

Shaggy singles chronology
"World Citizen" (2012)	"Girls Just Wanna Have Fun" (2012)	"Remain in Our Hearts" (2014)

Eve singles chronology
"Money in Da Bank" (2011)	"Girls Just Wanna Have Fun" (2012)	"Make It Out This Town" (2013)

"Girls Just Wanna Have Fun" is a song by reggae musician Shaggy, featuring American rapper Eve. The song was released as the official lead, and second overall single, from Shaggy's eleventh studio album, Rise. The song samples "Girls Just Want to Have Fun" by Cyndi Lauper.

The single was released in Germany and throughout Europe on 24 August 2012. The accompanying music video was directed by Ras Kassa, and was released via YouTube on 14 July 2012. The single found chart success in both Germany and Poland.

== Track listing ==
1. "Girls Just Wanna Have Fun" (Single Mix) – 3:26
2. "Girls Just Wanna Have Fun" (Extended Mix)
3. "Girls Just Wanna Have Fun" (Voodoo & Serano Mix Edit)
4. "Girls Just Wanna Have Fun" (Voodoo & Serano Remix)
5. "Girls Just Wanna Have Fun" (Remady Remix)
6. "Girls Just Wanna Have Fun" (Remady Extended Mix)

== Charts ==
Chart (2012)	Peak position
Austria (Ö3 Austria Top 40)	47
Belgium (Ultratop 50 Flanders)	39
Belgium Dance (Ultratop Flanders)	47
Belgium (Ultratop 50 Wallonia)	49
Belgium Dance (Ultratop Wallonia)	11
France (SNEP)	180
Germany (GfK)	29
Poland Airplay (ZPAV)	3
Poland (Video Chart)	2

== Release history ==
Country	Date	Label	Format
Germany	24 August 2012	Embassy of Music	CD single, digital download
