= Give It to You (Eve song) =

Single by Eve featuring Sean Paul

from the album Lip Lock (intended)
- B-side: "Tambourine"
- Released: July 31, 2007
- Genre: Hip hop; reggae fusion
- Length: 3:29
- Label: Aftermath; Full Surface; Interscope
- Songwriters: Eve Jeffers; Kasseem Dean; Sean Henriques
- Producer: Swizz Beatz

Eve singles chronology
| "Tambourine" (2007) | "Give It to You" (2007) | "Patron Tequila" (2009) |

Sean Paul singles chronology
| "Break It Off" (2006) | "Give It to You" (2007) | "Watch Dem Roll" (2007) |

"Give It to You" is a song by Eve. It is a non-album single that was to be released on her fourth studio album, Here I Am. The album ran into a series of delays and was ultimately renamed Lip Lock (2013). The song features dancehall artist Sean Paul and a mixture of Spanish guitar and reggae sounds. The song was sent to radio airplay on July 31, 2007 and released as a digital download on iTunes.

This song was placed at number 65 on MTV Asia's list of Top 100 Hits of 2007.

== Music video ==
The music video, directed by Melina and produced by John Winter, features cameo appearances by Swizz Beatz, Kanye West, Drag-On & Cassidy. The video premiered on July 30, 2007 on Total Request Live and on August 7, 2007 on 106 & Park. It spent eight days on Total Request Live, peaking at number 5.

The video opens up to a non-musical scene where Eve is cooking breakfast in her house. The phone rings and Eve answers the phone. The music begins and Sean Paul and Eve begin to sing over the phone to each other. Paul then hangs up and gets on his motorcycle and begins to ride to Eve's house. Meanwhile, Eve is sitting on the couch singing to the camera. Eve then sees Paul on his motorcycle, he tells her to hurry up and get ready. It then intercuts to the scene at night time where Eve gets onto the motorcycle and they begin to sing on the motorcycle. It shows more intercuts of Eve and Paul singing in the club and walking into the club. The video finishes with Eve dancing in the club and Paul dancing against a wall.

== Formats and track listing ==
CD single

1. "Give It to You" (Album version)
2. "Give It to You" (Instrumental)
3. "Tambourine"
4. "Give It to You" (Video)

UK/Germany CD single

1. "Give It to You" (Album version)
2. "Tambourine"

Australian CD single

1. "Give It to You" (Album version)
2. "Tambourine (Remix)"
3. "Let Me Blow Ya Mind (Stargate Remix)"
4. "Gangsta Lovin' (Radio Edit)"
5. "Who's That Girl? (C.I.A.S. Remix)"

== Charts ==
=== Weekly charts ===
| Chart (2007) | Peak position |
|---|---|
| Australian Urban (ARIA) | 36 |
| Canadian Digital Song Sales | 72 |
| CIS Airplay (TopHit) | 38 |
| Germany (GfK) | 49 |
| Romania (Romanian Top 100) | 7 |
| Russia Airplay (TopHit) | 25 |
| US Bubbling Under Hot 100 Singles (Billboard) | 24 |
| US Bubbling Under R&B/Hip-Hop Singles (Billboard) | 14 |

=== Year-end charts ===
| Chart (2007) | Position |
|---|---|
| CIS (Tophit) | 193 |
| Russia Airplay (TopHit) | 179 |
