= What Ya Want =

1999 single by Eve

Single by Eve featuring Nokio

from the album Ryde or Die Vol. 1 and Let There Be Eve...Ruff Ryders' First Lady
- Released: June 1999
- Genre: Hip hop
- Length: 4:23
- Label: Ruff Ryders; Interscope
- Songwriters: Eve Jeffers; Kasseem Dean
- Producer: Swizz Beatz

Eve singles chronology
"Ruff Ryders' Anthem (Remix)" (1999)	"What Ya Want" (1999)	"Gotta Man" (1999)

Nokio singles chronology
"What Ya Want" (1999)

"What Ya Want" (also titled "What Y'all Want") is a song by American rapper Eve. It features American singer Nokio of Dru Hill and appears on the compilation album Ryde or Die Vol. 1 (1999) by American record label Ruff Ryders Entertainment. A remix of the song appears as a bonus track on Eve's debut studio album Let There Be Eve...Ruff Ryders' First Lady (1999).

== Composition ==
"What Ya Want" is a hip hop song containing Latin-inspired elements. In a Pitchfork review, Rawiya Kameir described the song as "built around a rudimentary Latin preset on an E-MU synth".

== Charts ==
Chart (1999)	Peak position
US Billboard Hot 100	29
US Hot R&B/Hip-Hop Songs (Billboard)	9
US Hot Rap Songs (Billboard)	1
US Rhythmic Airplay (Billboard)	13
