= Let Me Blow Ya Mind =

2001 single by Eve featuring Gwen Stefani

Single by Eve featuring Gwen Stefani

from the album Scorpion and Eve-Olution (international edition)
- B-side: "Got It All"; "Ain't Got No Dough"; "Gotta Man"
- Released: April 2, 2001
- Studio: Record One (Sherman Oaks, California)
- Genre: Hip-hop; R&B
- Length: 3:51
- Label: Ruff Ryders; Interscope
- Songwriters: Eve Jeffers; Andre Young; Scott Storch; Steven Jordan; Mike Elizondo
- Producers: Dr. Dre; Scott Storch

Eve singles chronology
"Who's That Girl?" (2001)	"Let Me Blow Ya Mind" (2001)	"Caramel" (2001)

Gwen Stefani singles chronology
"South Side" (2000)	"Let Me Blow Ya Mind" (2001)	"What You Waiting For?" (2004)

Music video
- "Let Me Blow Ya Mind" on YouTube

"Let Me Blow Ya Mind" is a song by American rapper Eve featuring American singer Gwen Stefani of No Doubt. It was released on April 2, 2001, as the second and final single from the former's second album, Scorpion. It became Eve's highest-charting single on the US Billboard Hot 100 (along with 2002's "Gangsta Lovin'"), peaking at number two on the week of August 18, 2001. Worldwide, the single reached number one in Belgium (Flanders and Wallonia), Ireland, Norway, and Switzerland while entering the top 10 in nine additional countries.

The song was listed at number seven on the 2001 Pazz & Jop list, a survey of several hundred music critics conducted by Robert Christgau. It won a Grammy Award in 2002 for Best Rap/Sung Collaboration at the 44th Annual Grammy Awards, which was a new category at the time. The music video won the MTV Video Music Award for Best Female Video at the 2001 MTV Video Music Awards.

== Composition and lyrics ==
"Let Me Blow Ya Mind" was written completely by Eve and produced by Dr. Dre and Scott Storch for her 2001 album Scorpion. Eve had previously been signed by Dr. Dre, but had then been dropped from his Aftermath label for lack of direction. After her second deal with Ruff Ryders, she was able to reconnect with Dr. Dre. The lyrics address those who doubted Eve's ability to maintain mainstream popularity. Eve was told that the song was "never going to work"; however, her chemistry with Gwen Stefani was strong. The song is performed in the key of G♯ minor with a tempo of 90 beats per minute.

== Music video ==
In the video, Gwen Stefani and Eve are shown stopping at a red light. Eve brings in a gang of party crashers, and she tells Gwen to tag along. Gwen gets out of her car and gets onto an all-terrain vehicle. They crash a formal party (whose attendees include actor Udo Kier) with their loud music and rowdiness and are subsequently arrested. A Leona Helmsley lookalike appears in the video. She tells police officers about the disturbance as Stefani and Eve disrupt the party. Rapper/producer Dr. Dre also makes an appearance at the end of the video when he comes to jail and pays the bail for Eve and Stefani. Fellow Ruff Ryders Jadakiss and Styles P appear in a scene in which Eve acts as a bartender.

The video won the 2001 MTV Video Music Award for Best Female Video, and it was also nominated for Best Hip-Hop Video, losing to Outkast's "Ms. Jackson".

== Track listings ==
All versions of "Let Me Blow Ya Mind" feature Gwen Stefani.

Australasian CD single

1. "Let Me Blow Ya Mind" (album version) – 3:50
2. "Got It All" (featuring Jadakiss) – 3:48
3. "Who's That Girl?" (Akhenaton remix) – 3:59
4. "Let Me Blow Ya Mind" (video) – 4:15

European CD single

1. "Let Me Blow Ya Mind" (album version) – 3:50
2. "Got It All" (featuring Jadakiss) – 3:48

European maxi-CD single

1. "Let Me Blow Ya Mind" – 3:50
2. "Who's That Girl?" (C.L.A.S. remix) – 4:28
3. "Ain't Got No Dough" (featuring Missy Elliott) – 4:17
4. "Let Me Blow Ya Mind" (CD-ROM video)

UK CD single

1. "Let Me Blow Ya Mind" – 3:50
2. "Who's That Girl?" (Akhenaton remix) – 3:58
3. "Gotta Man" – 4:24
4. "Let Me Blow Ya Mind" (video)

UK 12-inch single

A1. "Let Me Blow Ya Mind" – 3:50
A2. "Let Me Blow Ya Mind" (instrumental) – 5:15
B1. "Who's That Girl?" (C.L.A.S. remix) – 4:28

UK cassette single

1. "Let Me Blow Ya Mind" – 3:50
2. "Who's That Girl?" (main pass) – 3:58

== Charts ==
=== Weekly charts ===
Chart (2001–2002)	Peak position
Australia (ARIA)	4
Australian Urban (ARIA)	2
Austria (Ö3 Austria Top 40)	6
Belgium (Ultratop 50 Flanders)	1
Belgium (Ultratop 50 Wallonia)	1
Canada Airplay (BDS)	24
Denmark (Tracklisten)	3
Europe (European Hot 100)	1
Finland (Suomen virallinen lista)	19
France (SNEP)	15
Germany (GfK)	5
Ireland (IRMA)	1
Italy (FIMI)	17
Netherlands (Dutch Top 40)	2
Netherlands (Single Top 100)	2
New Zealand (Recorded Music NZ)	7
Norway (VG-lista)	1
Portugal (AFP)	7
Scottish Singles Sales (Official Charts)	3
Sweden (Sverigetopplistan)	6
Switzerland (Schweizer Hitparade)	1
UK Singles (Official Charts)	4
UK Hip Hop/R&B (Official Charts)	1
US Billboard Hot 100	2
US Hot R&B/Hip-Hop Songs (Billboard)	6
US Hot Rap Songs (Billboard)	10
US Pop Airplay (Billboard)	1
US Rhythmic Airplay (Billboard)	1

Chart (2013)	Peak position
UK Dance (Official Charts)	37

=== Year-end charts ===
Chart (2001)	Position
Australia (ARIA)	24
Australian Urban (ARIA)	10
Austria (Ö3 Austria Top 40)	68
Belgium (Ultratop 50 Flanders)	18
Belgium (Ultratop 50 Wallonia)	15
Canada Airplay (Nielsen BDS)	95
Europe (European Hot 100)	19
France (SNEP)	93
Germany (Media Control)	69
Ireland (IRMA)	24
Netherlands (Dutch Top 40)	11
Netherlands (Single Top 100)	17
New Zealand (RIANZ)	32
Sweden (Hitlistan)	56
Switzerland (Schweizer Hitparade)	6
UK Singles (OCC)	45
UK Urban (Music Week)	10
US Billboard Hot 100	7
US Hot R&B/Hip-Hop Singles & Tracks (Billboard)	29
US Mainstream Top 40 (Billboard)	9
US Rhythmic Top 40 (Billboard)	2

=== Decade-end charts ===
Chart (2000–2009)	Position
Netherlands (Single Top 100)	89
US Billboard Hot 100	95

== Certifications ==
Region	Certification	Certified units/sales
Australia (ARIA)	Platinum	70,000^{^}
Belgium (BRMA)	Platinum	50,000^{*}
Denmark (IFPI Danmark)	Gold	45,000^{‡}
France (SNEP)	Silver	125,000^{*}
Germany (BVMI)	Gold	250,000^{‡}
New Zealand (RMNZ)	4× Platinum	120,000^{‡}
Norway (IFPI Norway)	Platinum	
Sweden (GLF)	Gold	15,000^{^}
Switzerland (IFPI Switzerland)	Gold	20,000^{^}
United Kingdom (BPI)	Platinum	628,000
United States (RIAA)	3× Platinum	3,000,000^{‡}
^{*} Sales figures based on certification alone.^{^} Shipments figures based on certification alone.^{‡} Sales+streaming figures based on certification alone.

== Release history ==
Region	Date	Format(s)	Label(s)	Ref(s).
United States	April 2, 2001	Rhythmic contemporary; urban radio	Interscope; Ruff Ryders	
United Kingdom	August 13, 2001	CD; cassette	Interscope; Ruff Ryders	
Netherlands	August 13, 2001	CD	Interscope; Ruff Ryders	
Europe	August 20, 2001	CD	Interscope; Ruff Ryders	
Australia	August 20, 2001	CD	Interscope; Ruff Ryders	
