= Lip Lock =

Studio album by Eve
- Released: May 14, 2013
- Recorded: 2007–2013
- Genre: Hip hop
- Length: 39:34
- Labels: From the Rib; RED
- Producers: Swizz Beatz; Blac Elvis; Jon Jon; Jukebox; Claude Kelly; Rico Love; Salaam Remi; Shoddy; Felix Snow; DJ Surge; Sander Van Der Waal; Radio8

Eve chronology
| Eve-Olution (2002) | Lip Lock (2013) |

Singles from Lip Lock
- 1. "She Bad Bad" Released: October 9, 2012; 2. "Make It Out This Town" Released: February 26, 2013; 3. "Eve" Released: April 29, 2013

Lip Lock (originally titled Here I Am and Flirt) is the fourth studio album by American rapper Eve. The album, her first in eleven years, was released on May 14, 2013, by From The Rib Music and distributed by RED Distribution. The album features guest appearances from Gabe Saporta, Dawn Richard, Missy Elliott, Snoop Dogg, Chrisette Michele, Juicy J, and Pusha T among others. The album was supported with the singles "She Bad Bad", "Make It Out This Town" and "Eve".

Lip Lock was met with generally positive reviews from music critics. The album debuted at number 46 on the US Billboard 200 chart, with first-week sales of 9,000 copies.

== Background ==
In 2007, Eve began working on a new album titled Here I Am. In May 2007, XXL magazine profiled six recorded tracks from Here I Am; five of them being produced by Swizz Beatz, including the singles "Tambourine" and "Give It to You" (featuring Sean Paul). Another song showcased, produced by Pharrell Williams of The Neptunes, was "All Night Long", a song where Eve sings as opposes to rapping. In July 2007, XXL published a review of Here I Am, rating it an L in its "shoe size" rating system ranging from S to XXL. However the album ran into a series of delays due to corporate change at the record label and discontent with the lackluster success of the first and second singles, "Tambourine", released in April 2007, and "Give It to You" (featuring Sean Paul), released during the summer. The project was delayed to September 11, 2007, and then October 16, 2007 but it was never released. Problems at her label, Interscope Records, were responsible for the multiple delays. Due to the delays, the album was often reworked, and multiple times the album was renamed from Here I Am to Flirt and finally to Lip Lock. In an interview with New York Post, it was revealed under the title Here I Am the album had actually been completed; however, both times Interscope shelved the project.

On January 10, 2010, Eve announced on her Twitter that she left Interscope, saying: "Let me tell u what happened with music so ya’ll don’t think I quit." she told her followers "Left Interscope, free agent now. Went back in re-doing music. Trust me." The album was then expected to be released during 2011, but it was delayed once again. In 2012, Eve decided she would release the album independently, creating her own label From The Rib Music, with distribution being handled through Sony/Red. She stated that there would be several buzz singles before the official single and said the album would have "hard street stuff", "radio singles' and 'stuff to listen to when you're feeling down". In a 2013, interview with Billboard, Eve said:

"One of the biggest things that I wanted to do on this album was make people realize why they fell in love with me in the first place and then take them on a journey to where I am now musically. My ear is different but I think people will recognize me. I think you'll hear that I'm in a happy place. I miss my music. My hunger is different than the first time around".

== Promotion and singles ==
In anticipation of the album, Eve released the song "She Bad Bad", produced by Jukebox, on October 9, 2012. It is her first release through her own independent record label, From the Rib. An accompanying music video for the promotional single was released on January 8, 2013. An official remix of "She Bad Bad", featuring rappers Juicy J and Pusha T, was released on January 23, 2013.

The album's lead single "Make It Out This Town", featuring guest vocals from Gabe Saporta of the synth-pop band Cobra Starship, was released on February 26, 2013. The music video for the song premiered on Vevo on March 29, 2013. Eve performed the song for the first time on the May 3, 2013 episode of Late Night with Jimmy Fallon, along with Gabe Saporta and The Roots. She performed again the song on Good Morning America on May 14, 2013. "Make It Out This Town" was released in the UK on May 26, 2013, trailing Lip Lock by one week.

In an interview on Rap-Up TV, Eve confirmed that the next single would be the track "Eve" featuring Jamaican reggae artist Miss Kitty. The music video for the song was shot in London in February and premiered on BET on April 29, 2013. The day after the single was officially released. Eve performed the song on the late night talk show Conan on June 26, 2013.

In September 2013, Eve said she was choosing between "Keep Me from You" featuring Dawn Richard and "Mama in the Kitchen" with Snoop Dogg as the album's next single, but eventually no more singles were released.

== Critical reception ==
Professional ratings
Aggregate scores
| Source | Rating |
|---|---|
| Metacritic | 62/100 |
Review scores
| Source | Rating |
| AllMusic | 3.5/5 stars |
| Fact | 3.5/5 stars |
| HipHopDX | 2.5/5 stars |
| PopMatters | 6/10 |
| RapReviews | 7/10 |
| Spin | 7/10 |
| New York Daily News | 3/5 stars |

Lip Lock was met with generally favorable reviews from music critics. At Metacritic, which assigns a weighted mean rating out of 100 to reviews from mainstream critics, the album received an average score of 62, based on 8 reviews, which indicates "generally favorable reviews". David Jeffries of AllMusic stated, "If Lip Lock isn't mean enough, well, neither is Eve. She's sweeter than before and musically more adventurous. It's just a shame she burned up the title Eve-Olution on that previous release." Julianne Escobedo Shepherd of Spin said, "Lip Lock may not be the best rap album of 2013, but it's interesting, and it's honest. After 11 years, that's a respectable way to ride out." Edwin Ortiz of HipHopDX said, "Seeing Eve return is a welcoming sight, and while unexpected, the experimental arrangements of her new project can be written off as just that. The heart of the issue with Lip Lock is that Eve hasn’t restored the command she once had, which subsequently allows these new sounds to lead her down a road of uncertainty. Eve’s maturation as a person has been obtained through time; it may take more before her music catches up." Lauren Martin of Fact stated, "Eve doesn’t dwell on the past with underhand bitterness or glassy-eyed nostalgia. Considering it’s been eleven years, there’s a pointedly absent element of story-telling about her hiatus which leaves the listener wanting more, yet Eve was never held up as a great lyricist and can’t really be bashed for not being one now. That’s not where her appeal lies. For all her success in commercial rap Eve is first and foremost a singer. It’s the fluidity of her appeal that she’s most keenly aware of, and this gets a triumphant finale on the remix of first single ‘She Bad Bad’ featuring Pusha T and Juicy J. As the three fellow comeback success stories stand side by side like this over what is certainly the album's most intense beat, even I feel smug listening to it. Eve is back, and she barely broke a sweat."

Steve Juon of RapReviews said, "Not every track on "Lip Lock is a home run, but she bats for the cycle here and only strikes out a few times ("Keep Me From You" is just too cotton candy for me). That's pretty incredible given how long she's been away. Who knows? Maybe she'll end up signing DMX to her imprint. She's got her life together, her businesses are successful, and she's still a bad bitch – but no longer afraid that showing her feminine side will make her come across soft or weak to a misogynistic audience. She can be the pitbull when necessary or the poodle when she feels like it and it's her flawless ability to switch it up that commands your attention." Jim Farber of New York Daily News stated, "To be specific, 11 long years have passed since the one-time Queen MC of Ruff Ryders Records completed a disc — 2002’s Eve-Olution. For the last six years, she’s been tinkering with tracks, leaking some out while experiencing increasing frustration with her label (Interscope). Small wonder the long-aborning Lip Lock appears on her own label. The lag may also explain why we’re hearing a more mature Eve here, less angry, more open to pop." Elias Leight of PopMatters said, "Eve tries to sound current—Lip Lock is consistently dense with electronics that nod to today’s pop-scape. No Neptunes and Dre here, but plenty of low frequency throbbing and high-pitched glitch noises. Eve doesn’t reach for the dance floor often, but this is hip-hop that acknowledges EDM and dub-step. There are a few songs that sound very different from the rest and instantly seem like outliers."

== Commercial performance ==
The album debuted at number 46 on the US Billboard 200 chart, number 10 on the Independent Albums chart, and number 7 on the Top R&B/Hip Hop Albums chart with first-week sales of 9,000 copies. The album also charted on the ARIA Urban Albums chart in Australia at number 31.

== Track listing ==
Lip Lock track listing
| No. | Title | Writer(s) | Producer(s) | Length |
|---|---|---|---|---|
| 1. | "Eve" (featuring Miss Kitty) | Eve Jeffers; Troy Johnson; Khadine Hylton | Radio8 | 3:33 |
| 2. | "She Bad Bad" | Jeffers; Ronald Jackson | Jukebox | 3:05 |
| 3. | "Make It Out This Town" (featuring Gabe Saporta of Cobra Starship) | Jeffers; Nicholas Oshane Moore; Claude Kelly; Jon Webb, Jr. | Jon Jon; Kelly^{[a]} | 3:56 |
| 4. | "All Night" (featuring Claude Kelly and Propain) | Jeffers; Webb, Jr.; Moore; Kelly; Chris Dudley | Jon Jon; Kelly^{[a]} | 3:12 |
| 5. | "Keep Me from You" (featuring Dawn Richard) | Jeffers; Moore; Van Der Waal; Sander Van Der Waal; Sérgio Marques; Taj Jackson; Takeya Rideout; Tatiana Matthews | Sander Van Der Waal; DJ Surge | 3:10 |
| 6. | "Wanna Be" (featuring Missy Elliott and Nacho) | Jeffers; Moore; Laquisha Hankens; Melissa Elliott | Blac Elvis | 3:21 |
| 7. | "Mama in the Kitchen" (featuring Snoop Dogg) | Jeffers; Calvin Broadus; Jackson; Kasseem Dean | Jukebox; Swizz Beatz | 3:11 |
| 8. | "Grind or Die" | Jeffers; Moore; William Van Der Heyden | Felix Snow | 2:22 |
| 9. | "Zero Below" | Jeffers; Moore; Van Der Waal; Marques; Jackson; Rideout; Matthews | Van Der Waal; DJ Surge | 3:13 |
| 10. | "Forgive Me" | Jeffers; Salaam Remi; Rico Love | Remi; Love | 3:11 |
| 11. | "Never Gone" (featuring Chrisette Michele) | Jeffers; Michael Woods; Rashad Robinson; Moore; Matthews; Jackson | Shoddy | 4:15 |
| 12. | "She Bad Bad (Remix)" (featuring Juicy J and Pusha T) | Jeffers; Jackson; Terrence Thornton; Jordan Houston | Jukebox | 3:04 |
| Total length: | | | | 39:34 |

Leftover tracks

- "Give It to You" (featuring Sean Paul)
- "Tambourine" (featuring Swizz Beatz)
- "Dance Floor" (featuring Mashonda)
- "Cashflow"(featuring T.I.)
- "Set It on Fire"
- "Fantasy" (featuring Robin Thicke)
- "Tambourine (Remix)" (featuring Swizz Beatz, Missy Elliot and Fabolous)

Notes

- ^{^[a]} denotes co-producer

== Personnel ==
Adapted from Barnes & Noble.com.

Performers

- Eve – primary artist
- Juicy J – guest vocals
- Pusha T – guest vocals
- Chrisette Michele – guest vocals
- Snoop Dogg – guest vocals
- Missy Elliott – guest vocals
- Dawn Richard
- Claude Kelly – guest vocals
- Propain – guest vocals
- Miss Kitty – guest vocals
- Nacho – guest vocals
- Salaam Remi – bass, guitar, drums, keyboards

Technical credits

- Bruce Carbone – executive producer
- Fred Kevorkian – mastering
- Salaam Remi – producer
- Michael Woods – engineer
- DJ Surge – producer
- Swizz Beatz – producer
- The Jukebox – producer
- Nicholas Oshane – producer
- Trevor Niemann – art direction
- Rico Love – producer
- Claude Kelly – producer
- Gleyder "Gee" Disla – engineer
- Phil Scott – engineer
- Shoddy – producer
- Mike Piazza – engineer
- Jon Jon – producer
- Sander Van Der Waal – producer
- Amarpaul Kalirai – art direction
- James Chul Rim – engineer
- Blac Elvis – producer
- Travis "Viko" Blake – engineer
- R8d!0 – producer
- Lauren D'Elia – engineer
- Felix Snow – producer, engineer
- Den Fang – engineer
- Mike Woods – engineer

== Charts ==
Chart performance for Lip Lock
| Chart (2013) | Peak position |
|---|---|
| Australian Urban Albums (ARIA) | 31 |
| US Billboard 200 | 46 |
| US Independent Albums (Billboard) | 10 |
| US Top R&B/Hip-Hop Albums (Billboard) | 7 |

== Release history ==
Release history and formats for Lip Lock
| Region | Date | Format | Label |
|---|---|---|---|
| United States | May 14, 2013 | CD, digital download | From the Rib Music, RED Distribution |
| Ireland | May 30, 2013 | CD, digital download | From the Rib Music, EMI |
| United Kingdom | June 2, 2013 | CD, digital download | From the Rib Music, EMI |
