= Eve (rapper) =

American rapper (born 1978)

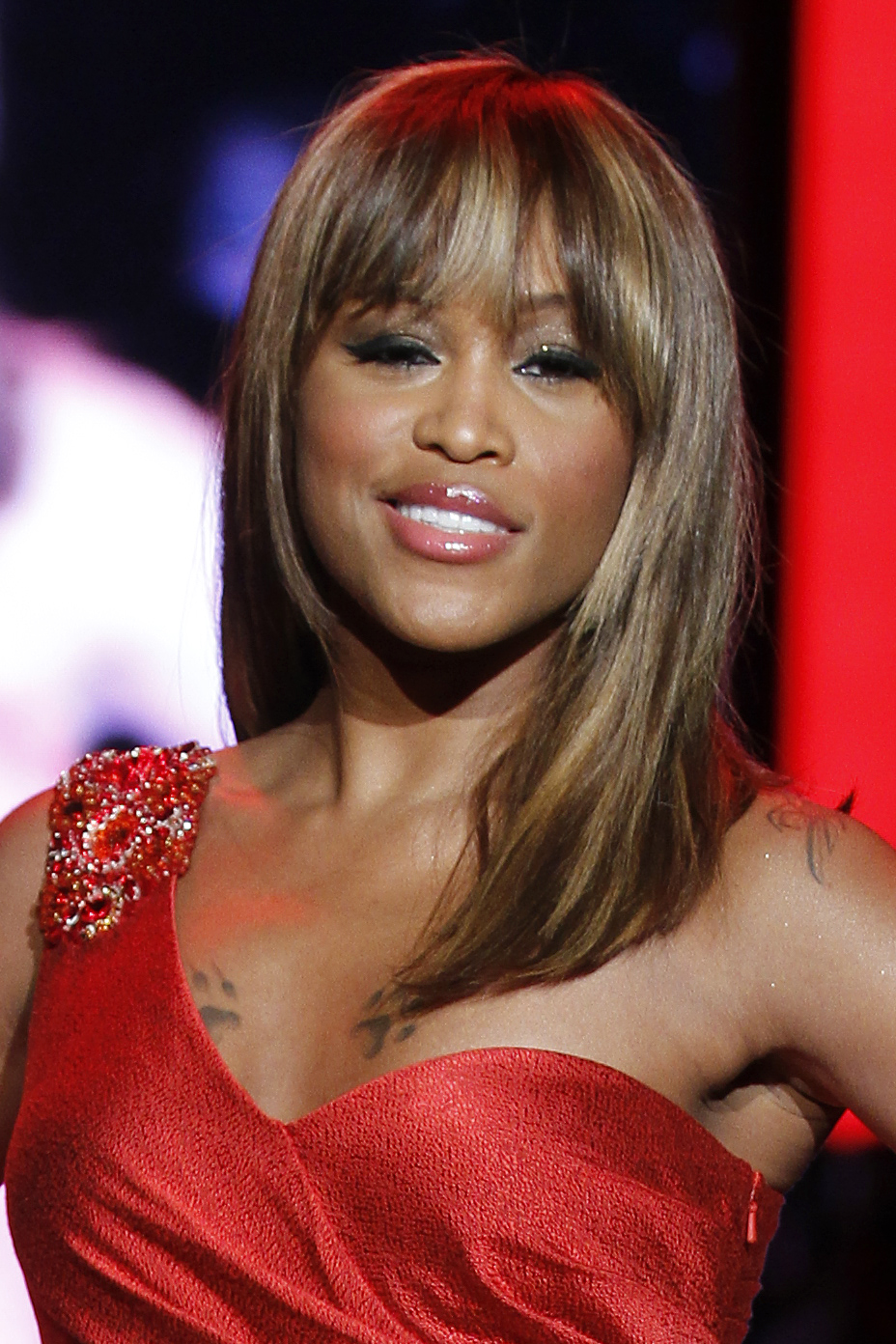
- Eve at The Heart Truth's Red Dress Collection Fashion Show, 2011
- Born: Eve Jihan Jeffers; November 10, 1978 (age 48); Philadelphia, Pennsylvania, U.S.
- Education: Martin Luther King High School
- Occupations: Rapper; singer; songwriter; actress; television personality
- Years active: 1996–present
- Works: Discography; filmography
- Television: Eve
- Spouse: Maximillion Cooper (m. 2014)
- Children: 1
- Awards: Full list
- Musical career
- Genre: East Coast hip-hop
- Instrument: Vocals
- Labels: From the Rib; Sony Music; Full Surface; Interscope; Aftermath; Ruff Ryders
- Formerly of: Ruff Ryders

Eve Jihan Cooper (née Jeffers; born November 10, 1978) is an American rapper, singer, and actress. Her debut studio album, Let There Be Eve...Ruff Ryders' First Lady (1999), peaked atop the Billboard 200 (making her the third female rapper to do so), received double platinum certification by the Recording Industry Association of America (RIAA), and spawned the singles "What Ya Want" (featuring Nokio), "Love Is Blind", and "Gotta Man". That same year, she guest appeared on the Roots' single "You Got Me", as well as Missy Elliott's single "Hot Boyz", both of which peaked within the top 40 of the Billboard Hot 100 (the latter reaching number 5).

Eve's second and third studio albums, Scorpion (2001) and Eve-Olution (2002), were both met with continued commercial success. Their respective lead singles, "Let Me Blow Ya Mind" (featuring Gwen Stefani) and "Gangsta Lovin'" (featuring Alicia Keys), both peaked at number two on the Billboard Hot 100; the former won her the inaugural Grammy Award for Best Rap/Sung Collaboration. Her 2007 standalone single, "Tambourine" (featuring Swizz Beatz), also entered the Billboard Hot 100's top 40. After parting ways with Interscope Records, Eve released her fourth studio album, Lip Lock (2013), as her first independent project.

As an actress, she starred as Terri Jones in the comedy drama films Barbershop, Barbershop 2: Back in Business, and Barbershop: The Next Cut, and played the lead role of Shelley Williams on the UPN television sitcom Eve. Eve also had supporting roles in the drama film The Woodsman (2004), the comedy film The Cookout (2004) and the horror film Animal (2014). From 2017 to 2020, she co-hosted the CBS Daytime talk show The Talk, where she was nominated for two Daytime Emmy Awards.

== Early life ==
Eve Jihan Jeffers was born on November 10, 1978, in Philadelphia, Pennsylvania, the daughter of Julie Wilch, a publishing company supervisor and Jerry Jeffers, a chemical plant supervisor. Eve lived in West Philadelphia until age 13 when her family moved to the neighborhood of Germantown. She graduated from Martin Luther King High School in Philadelphia.

At the age of 18, she worked as a stripper until rapper Mase convinced her to quit. In 1999, Eve discussed stripping in an interview with Rolling Stone, saying "that was a hustle, too; there's a song about it on my album, 'Heaven Only Knows.' But I don't regret it – I was eighteen and confused, going through personal problems. I did it for about a month, and I was glad I did it. It helped me find Eve, helped me get serious. It was depressing – a lot of those girls have three or four kids. I'd sit there and be like, 'Eve, you don't belong here, this is not your world.'"

Eve's first musical interest was singing. She sang in many choirs and even formed an all-female singing group (Dope Girl Posse or EDGP) with a manager. This group covered songs from En Vogue and Color Me Badd. The group's manager suggested that they should start rapping, and Eve stuck with it. After the group split up, Eve began working on a solo career under the name "Eve of Destruction".

== Career ==
=== 1998–2001: Beginnings, debut album and breakthrough ===
In 1998, Eve appeared on the Bulworth soundtrack as Eve of Destruction while signed to Dr. Dre's record label Aftermath Entertainment. She appeared on DMX's song "Ruff Ryders' Anthem" (Remix) from his album It's Dark and Hell Is Hot . She also appeared on The Roots' single "You Got Me" from the band's fourth album Things Fall Apart., which went on to win a Grammy in 2000, but without her as the collaborated artist. 26 years later in 2026, after a technicality from The Recording Academy, The Black Music Collective finally awarded her the Grammy from that win, for her contribution respectively. Eve also provided background vocals on The Roots' song "Ain't Sayin' Nothin' New" from Things Fall Apart and is credited as Eve of Destruction. Eve's first single, "What Y'all Want", featuring Nokio the N-Tity of Dru Hill, was released in June 1999. The song peaked at number 29 on the U.S. Billboard Hot 100 chart and at number one on the Hot Rap Songs chart. "What Ya'll Want" was included on the compilation album Ryde or Die Vol. 1 (1999).

Her debut album called Let There Be Eve...Ruff Ryders' First Lady was released on September 14, 1999, by Ruff Ryders Entertainment and Interscope Records, and sold 213,000 copies in the first week. Eve became the third female hip-hop artist to have her album peak at number one on the Billboard 200, with Lauryn Hill's debut album, The Miseducation of Lauryn Hill, being the first to top the chart in 1998 and Foxy Brown's second album, Chyna Doll achieving the feat earlier in 1999. The album has sold over two million copies (according to SoundScan) and is certified Double Platinum. It features singles such as "Gotta Man" and "Love Is Blind", which was written when she was 16 and is based on her 17-year-old best friend's relationship with a 35-year-old abusive man by whom she became pregnant. All of the songs on the album were written by Eve herself.

In November 1999, Eve was featured on Missy Elliott's single "Hot Boyz (Remix)" alongside Nas, Lil Mo, and Q-Tip. The remix broke the record for most weeks at number-one on the US R&B chart issue dated January 15, 2000, as well as spending 18 weeks at number one on the Hot Rap Singles from December 4, 1999, to March 25, 2000.

Eve does not like being referred to as a "Pop Princess". Her second studio album Scorpion, was released on March 6, 2001. She appeared on the cover of Jet magazine, which referred to her as the "Queen of Rap". The album's first single, "Who's That Girl" peaked at number 47 on the Billboard Hot 100 and number six in the United Kingdom. It was also number 97 on VH1's 100 Greatest Songs of Hip Hop. The second single, "Let Me Blow Ya Mind" with Gwen Stefani of No Doubt, peaked at number two on the Billboard Hot 100 and number one on the US Mainstream Top 40 chart. It won a Grammy Award in 2002 for Best Rap/Sung Collaboration, which was a brand new category at the time. The song was listed at number seven on the 2001 Pazz & Jop list, a survey of several hundred music critics conducted by Robert Christgau. A remix of "Love Is Blind" featuring singer Faith Evans also appeared on the album. In June 2001, Eve won the BET Award for Best Female Hip-Hop Artist. In November 2001, she appeared as a contestant on the game show Who Wants to Be a Millionaire and won $32,000 for her charity.

=== 2002–2012: Eve-Olution, collaborations and acting roles ===
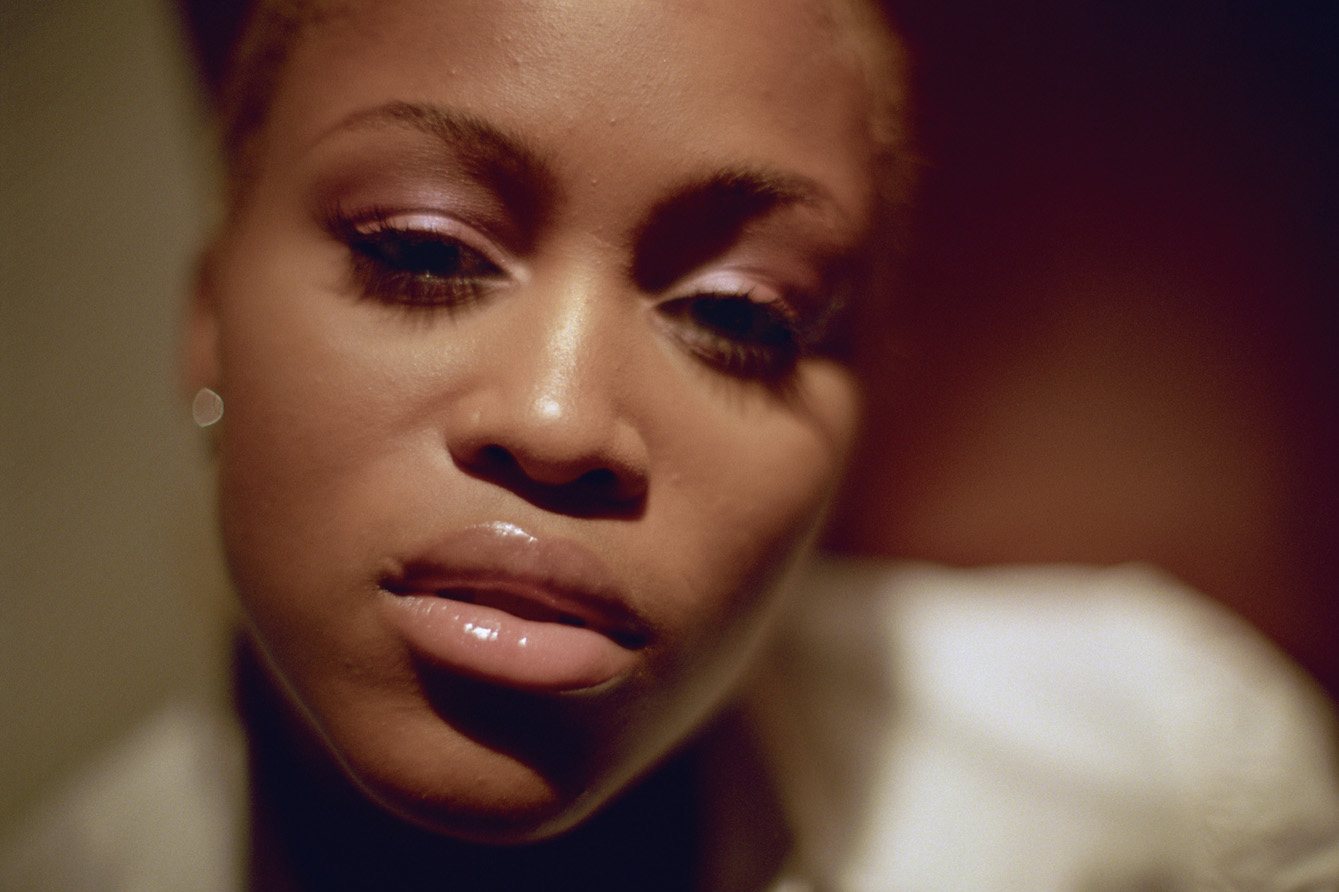
Eve in 2003

Eve's third album, Eve-Olution, was released by Ruff Ryders Entertainment on August 27, 2002, and peaked at number six on the Billboard 200. The album's first single, "Gangsta Lovin'", with Alicia Keys, became her second consecutive number-two hit on the Billboard Hot 100, as well as her third consecutive top ten hit in the United Kingdom. The second single, "Satisfaction" was moderately successful in the United States, reaching number 27 and 22 on the Billboard Hot 100 and R&B/Hip-Hop Songs chart. Eve-Olution has sold over 500,000 copies in the U.S. and was certified gold in sales by the Recording Industry Association of America (RIAA).

In 2002, Eve appeared on the remixed version of Michael Jackson's "Butterflies". She appeared in the action film XXX (2002) and all three Barbershop films (Barbershop, Barbershop 2: Back in Business, and Barbershop: The Next Cut). In 2003, Eve starred as fashion designer Shelly Williams in the television sitcom, Eve. The show aired for three seasons on UPN, from September 15, 2003, to May 11, 2006, and followed two sets of male and female friends attempting to navigate relationships with the opposite sex. Eve guest starred as Yvette Powell in an episode of NBC's crime drama television series Third Watch. In 2004, she appeared in two films, The Woodsman and The Cookout.

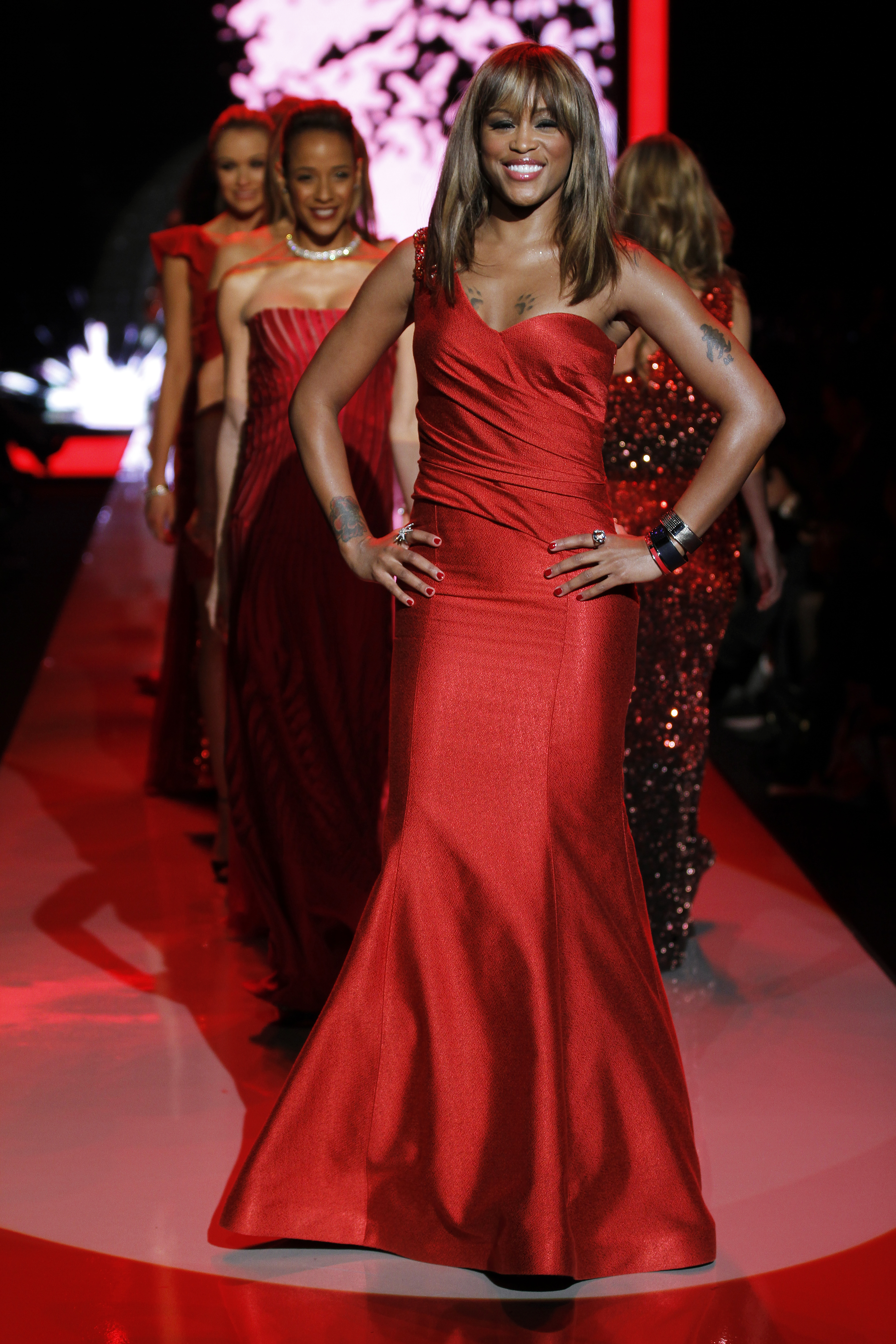
Eve at The Heart Truth's Red Dress Collection Fashion Show, 2011

In 2005, she appeared on Gwen Stefani's song "Rich Girl", which peaked at number seven on the Billboard Hot 100 in March. In the United States, "Rich Girl" was certified gold, and it received a nomination for Best Rap/Sung Collaboration at the 47th Grammy Awards. The same year, she appeared on the official remix of Amerie's number one U.S. R&B single, "1 Thing". She also appeared on Keyshia Cole's single "Never" and Teairra Mari's official remix for "No Daddy". In 2007, Eve appeared on Kelly Rowland's single "Like This" which reached the top-ten in Ireland and the United Kingdom, the top-twenty in Australia and New Zealand, as well as number 30 on the US Billboard Hot 100 chart. In July 2007, Eve made a guest appearance on Maroon 5's second single "Wake Up Call" on Live 45th at Night. In late 2008, she performed "Set It On Fire", which became available on the Transporter 3 soundtrack. In April 2009, Eve and Lil Jon appeared on the song "Patron Tequila", the debut single of girl group Paradiso Girls.

She played Ophelia Franklin in the British drama film Flashbacks of a Fool (2008). In 2009, she landed a role as Rosa Sparks in the comedy-drama film Whip It, opposite Elliot Page and Drew Barrymore. It received generally positive reviews from critics but did not perform well financially, having made $16.6 million worldwide against its $15 million budget. Also in 2009, she portrayed La-La Buendia in an episode of CBS' crime drama series Numbers and appeared in two episodes of Fox's musical comedy-drama series Glee, appearing as Grace Hitchens. She portrayed Latisha in the crime thriller film 4.3.2.1. (2010) alongside Emma Roberts and Tamsin Egerton. Eve hosted the 2010 MTV Africa Music Awards.

In March 2010, Eve was featured on the official remix of Ludacris' song "My Chick Bad". In November 2010, Eve performed a rap on Australian singer Guy Sebastian's single "Who's That Girl", which reached number one on the ARIA Singles Chart and has been certified 4× Platinum. In December 2010, Eve was featured on Alicia Keys' song "Speechless", which charted at number 71 on the US Hot R&B/Hip-Hop Songs chart in early 2011. In March 2011, Eve was featured on Swizz Beatz' song "Everyday (Coolin')", the first promotional single from his upcoming album Haute Living. In April 2011, she appeared on Jill Scott's song "Shame" from her album The Light of the Sun. She also appeared on Russian rapper Timati's single "Money In Da Bank" and Wolfgang Gartner's song "Get Em". In April 2012, Eve appeared on reggae artist Shaggy's single "Girls Just Wanna Have Fun".

=== 2013–2015: Lip Lock and label change ===
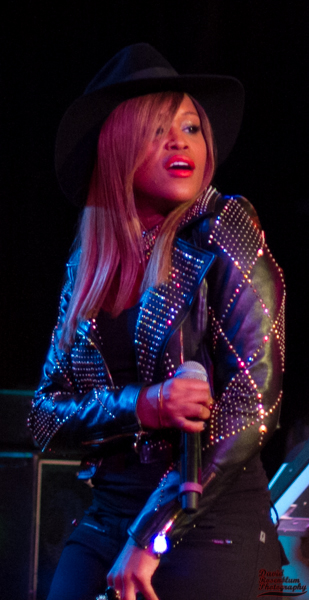
Eve performing at the Roxy, 2013

In 2007, Eve began working on a new album titled Here I Am. Five of the album's songs were produced by Swizz Beatz, including the singles "Tambourine" and "Give It to You" (featuring Sean Paul). "Tambourine" debuted at number 73 on the Billboard Hot R&B/Hip-Hop Songs chart in the week of April 19, 2007. In the United Kingdom, the song debuted at number 38, two weeks before the song's physical release. "Tambourine" peaked at number 18 there and was her fifth consecutive top twenty solo hit in the UK. The song peaked at number 68 on Rolling Stone's list of the 100 Best Songs of 2007, and was placed at number 70 on MTV Asia's list of Top 100 Hits of 2007. Pharrell Williams produced the song "All Night Long", in which Eve sings rather than raps. The album ran into a series of delays due to corporate change at the record label and discontent with the lackluster success of the singles.

The album was renamed twice from "Here I Am" to "Flirt" to "Lip Lock". After Eve left Interscope Records and signed with EMI, Lip Lock was expected to be released in 2011, but it was delayed again. In 2012, Eve decided to release the album as an independent artist, and stated that there will be several buzz singles before the official single release. In an interview with Billboard, Eve stated that "one of the biggest things that I wanted to do on this album was make people realize why they fell in love with me in the first place and then take them on a journey to where I am now musically. My ear is different but I think people will recognize me. I think you'll hear that I'm in a happy place. I miss my music. My hunger is different than the first time around".

On October 9, 2012, Eve released a promotional single titled "She Bad Bad" on iTunes. In November 2012, Eve released a series of weekly remixes on YouTube called EVEstlin' Tuesdays, in which she added freestyle rap verses on 2012 hit singles, such as Rihanna's "Diamonds" and Miguel's "Adorn". The album's first official single, "Make It Out This Town", featuring Gabe Saporta of Cobra Starship was released on February 23, 2013. In an interview with Rap-Up TV, Eve confirmed that the second official single would be "Eve" featuring Jamaican reggae artist Miss Kitty. The music video for the song was shot in London in February 2013 and premiered on BET on April 29, 2013.

On May 14, 2013, Lip Lock was released under her own label From The Rib Music and distributed through Sony/RED. The album debuted at number 46 on the Billboard 200 chart, and features collaborations with Juicy J, Dawn Richards, Claude Kelly, Pusha T, Chrisette Michele, Nacho, Gabe Saporta, Propaine, Missy Elliott, and Snoop Dogg. During this time, Eve appeared in the post-apocalyptic action comedy Bounty Killer (2013) and the horror thriller film Animal (2014). She also appeared in two episodes of the Oxygen reality television series Sisterhood of Hip Hop. In 2015, Eve portrayed Amaya in Lifetime's romantic comedy With This Ring, which also starred Jill Scott and Regina Hall.

=== 2016–present: Television projects ===
In April 2016, it was announced that Eve would join Gwen Stefani on her This Is What the Truth Feels Like Tour. The tour began on July 12, 2016, in Mansfield, Massachusetts at the Xfinity Center and continued throughout North America before concluding on October 16, 2016, in Inglewood, California at The Forum. In 2016, she hosted VH1's annual event Hip Hop Honors, which honors old school and golden age hip hop rappers and contributors for their long-term influence and importance in the history of hip hop culture. In 2017, she portrayed Cecile James in two episodes of VH1's satirical comedy-drama television series Daytime Divas. On November 14, 2017, Eve became a co-host of the CBS Daytime talk show, The Talk, replacing Aisha Tyler. In 2018, she appeared in several television shows, including Jane the Virgin, Empire, Celebrity Family Feud, and Happy Together.

On July 12, 2019, Eve released her first single in six years titled "Reload", featuring Jamaican dancehall artist Konshens. In November 2019, Eve and Gwen Stefani performed "Rich Girl" on NBC's competition series The Voice. The special performance celebrated Stefani's debut solo album's 15th anniversary. Eve hosted the 47th annual Daytime Emmy Awards with Sharon Osbourne, Sheryl Underwood, Carrie Ann Inaba, and Marie Osmond on June 26, 2020. She received a second Daytime Emmy Award nomination for Outstanding Entertainment Talk Show Host along with her The Talk co-stars in 2020. On the November 2, 2020, episode of The Talk, Eve announced that she would be leaving the show at the end of the year due to the impending lockdown restrictions preventing her from returning to the US, and plans to expand her current family.

On March 6, 2021, Eve released a 20th anniversary re-release of her album Scorpion with four new remixes. On June 16, 2021, Eve and Trina battled in the webcast series Verzuz.

On March 8, 2021, it was announced that Eve was to join the cast of American Broadcasting Company's music series Queens, alongside Naturi Naughton and Brandy. In May 2021, it was announced the show was being picked up for a full series, followed by the first official trailer, released on May 18, 2021. On October 1, 2021, the first promo single from Queens ("Nasty Girl") was released featuring Eve alongside the cast: Brandy, Naturi Naughton and Nadine Velazquez. A music video, directed by Tim Story, was released on the same day. This was followed on October 18, 2021, by another rap song from the Queens soundtrack: "The Introduction", which was co-written by Nas. Queens debuted on October 19, 2021, and reviews were largely positive; Caroline Framke for Variety praised the quartet's musical offering, calling their raps "sharp and distinct […] making clear their talent as both individuals and a swaggering collective". Angie Han for The Hollywood Reporter called the show "Impressive […] lavish […] magic". The show was cancelled in early 2022 after one season.

== Other ventures ==
Eve has appeared in music videos throughout her career. She was on the covers of numerous magazines, including Essence, Teen People, Allure, Rolling Stone, Paper, Philadelphia Style, Giant, Blaze, Vibe, Inked, XXL, and Ebony. She has also appeared in television commercials for Clarica, Pepsi, and Sprite. Her print ads include Tommy Hilfiger and MAC Cosmetics' Viva Glam campaign.

In 2003, Eve launched a clothing line titled Fetish which was targeted towards black women. Fetish was discontinued in September 2009.

== Personal life ==
Eve relocated to London after she began dating entrepreneur Maximillion Cooper in 2010. The couple became engaged on December 25, 2013, and married on June 14, 2014, in Ibiza, Spain. Eve has four stepchildren, all from Cooper's previous marriage. In October 2021, Eve announced she was expecting her first child with Cooper. Their first child, a son, was born on February 1, 2022.

Eve previously dated Teodoro Nguema Obiang Mangue, son of Equatorial Guinean dictator Teodoro Obiang Nguema Mbasogo. She appeared in a 2010 investigation of his corruption by the US Senate as the president of one of his shell companies.

== Discography ==
Studio albums

- Let There Be Eve...Ruff Ryders' First Lady (1999)
- Scorpion (2001)
- Eve-Olution (2002)
- Lip Lock (2013)

== Tours ==
Headlining

- Lip Lock Tour (2013)
- Scorpion Tour (2026)

Co-headlining

- Ruff Ryders-Cash Money Tour (2000)
- Total Request Live Tour (2001)
- Ruff Ryders 20th Anniversary Tour (2017)

Opening act

- Ja Rule Tour (2003)
- This Is What the Truth Feels Like Tour (2016)

== Filmography ==
=== Film ===
| Year | Title | Role | Notes |
|---|---|---|---|
| 2002 | Barbershop | Terri Jones | |
| 2002 | XXX | J.J. | |
| 2003 | Charlie's Angels: Full Throttle | Herself | |
| 2004 | The Woodsman | Mary-Kay | |
| 2004 | Barbershop 2: Back in Business | Terri Jones | |
| 2004 | The Cookout | Becky | |
| 2008 | Flashbacks of a Fool | Ophelia Franklin | |
| 2009 | Whip It | Rosa Sparks | |
| 2010 | 4.3.2.1. | Latisha | |
| 2012 | All Wifed Out | Natalie | |
| 2013 | Bounty Killer | Mocha Sujata | |
| 2014 | Animal | Barbara | |
| 2015 | With This Ring | Amaya | TV movie |
| 2016 | Barbershop: The Next Cut | Terri Jones | |
| 2025 | Christmas Karma | Herself | |

=== Television ===
| Year | Title | Role | Notes |
|---|---|---|---|
| 1999 | Soul Train | Herself | Episode: "Silk/Eve/Lost Boyz" |
| 1999 | Showtime at the Apollo | Herself | Episode: "Episode 13.6" |
| 2000 | FANatic | Herself | Episode: "Sarah Michelle Gellar/Eve" |
| 2001 | Making the Video | Herself | Episode: "Eve: Who's That Girl?" |
| 2001 | Soul Train Lady of Soul Awards | Herself/Co-Host | Main Co-Host |
| 2001 | Who Wants to Be a Millionaire | Herself/Contestant | Episode: "Celebrity Edition 4, Show 1 & 3-4" |
| 2001–2005 | Saturday Night Live | Herself | Recurring Guest |
| 2001–2005 | Top of the Pops | Herself | Recurring Guest |
| 2003 | Style Star | Herself | Episode: "Eve" |
| 2003 | Third Watch | Yvette Powel | Episode: "Second Chances" |
| 2003 | Spider-Man: The New Animated Series | Cheyenne/Talon (voice) | Episode: "Keeping Secrets" |
| 2003–2006 | Eve | Shelly Williams | Main Cast |
| 2004 | E! True Hollywood Story | Herself | Episode: "Missy 'Misdemeanor' Elliott" |
| 2004 | Punk'd | Herself | Episode: "Episode 3.1" |
| 2004 | One on One | Ida | Episode: "It's a Mad, Mad, Mad, Mad Hip Hop World" |
| 2005 | The Apprentice | Herself | Episode: "Bling It On" |
| 2005 | Red Nose Day | Herself | Episode: "Red Nose Day 2005" |
| 2005 | Ant & Dec's Saturday Night Takeaway | Herself | Episode: "Episode 5.5" |
| 2005 | America's Next Top Model | Herself | Episode: "The Girl Who Gets Bad News" |
| 2006 | Your Total Health | Herself | Episode: "Episode 3.20" |
| 2008 | Stylista | Herself | Episode: "The Right Fit" |
| 2009 | Styl'd | Herself | Episode: "Catwalks and Catfights" |
| 2009 | Numbers | La-La Buendia | Episode: "Sneakerhead" |
| 2009 | Glee | Grace Hitchens | Recurring Cast: Season 1 |
| 2010 | Behind the Music | Herself | Episode: "Eve" |
| 2010 | Double Exposure | Herself | Episode: "A Monster with Two Heads" |
| 2010 | MTV Africa Music Awards | Herself/Host | Main Host |
| 2011 | Audrina | Herself | Episode: "Cheers to the Freakin' Weekend" |
| 2011–2012 | Single Ladies | Herself | Guest Cast: Season 1-2 |
| 2012 | Whitney | Britnee | Episode: "Something Old, Something New" |
| 2013 | Marked Up | Herself | Episode: "Episode 2.2" |
| 2013 | The Getaway | Herself | Episode: "Eve in Kingston" |
| 2014 | The Dudesons | Herself | Episode: "Gumball Rally in America" |
| 2014 | RuPaul's Drag Race | Herself/Guest Judge | Episode: "Oh No She Betta Don't!" |
| 2016 | Inside the Label | Herself | Episode: "Ruff Ryders Entertainment" |
| 2016 | VH1 Hip Hop Honors: All Hail the Queens | Herself/Host | Main Host |
| 2016 | The Real | Herself/Guest Co-Host | Recurring Guest Co-Host: Season 3 |
| 2017 | Daytime Divas | Cecile James | Recurring Cast |
| 2017–2020 | The Talk | Herself/Co-Host | Main Co-Host: Season 8-11 |
| 2018 | Celebrity Family Feud | Herself | Episode: "Episode 5.2" |
| 2018 | Jane the Virgin | Herself | Episode: "Chapter Seventy-Four" |
| 2018 | Empire | Herself | Episode: "Bloody Noses and Crack'd Crowns" |
| 2018 | Happy Together | Herself | Episode: "The Power of Yes... Men" |
| 2019 | Let's Make a Deal | Herself | Episode: "Episode 10.151" |
| 2020 | Ruff Ryders Chronicles | Herself | Main Guest |
| 2020 | Uncensored | Herself | Episode: "Eve" |
| 2020 | Kidding | Herself | Episode: "I Wonder What Grass Tastes Like" |
| 2020 | Play On: Celebrating the Power of Music to Make Change | Herself/Co-Host | Main Co-Host |
| 2021 | Secret Celebrity Renovation | Herself | Episode: "Eve" |
| 2021 | Feel Good | Audrey | Episode: "Episode 2" |
| 2021–2022 | Queens | Breanna "Professor Sex" | Main Cast |
| 2022 | Origins of Hip Hop | Herself | Episode: "Fat Joe" & "Eve" |
| 2023 | Welcome to Rap City | Herself | Episode: "Building a City" |

=== Video games ===
| Year | Title | Role |
|---|---|---|
| 2003 | XIII | Major Jones (voice) |
| 2020 | XIII Remake | Major Jones (voice) |

=== Documentary ===
| Year | Title |
|---|---|
| 2002 | Slip N' Slide: All Star Weekend |
| 2008 | Hotel Gramercy Park |
| 2008 | The Upsetter |
| 2009 | Good Hair |
| 2010 | My Mic Sounds Nice: A Truth About Women and Hip Hop |
| 2010 | Music |
| 2011 | Gumball 3000: LDN 2 NYC |
| 2012 | Gumball 3000: Number 13 |
| 2021 | The Real Queens of Hip Hop: The Women Who Changed the Game |

== Awards and nominations ==
Media offices
| Preceded by Aisha Tyler | The Talk co-host 2017–2020 | Succeeded by Elaine Welteroth |

| Preceded by Wyclef Jean | MTV Africa Music Awards host 2010 | Succeeded by Marlon Wayans |
