= Eve-Olution =

Studio album by Eve
- Released: August 27, 2002
- Studios: Encore Studios (Burbank, CA); The Hit Factory (New York, NY); The New Hit Factory (New York, NY); Conway Recording Studios (Hollywood, CA); DoggHouse Studio "The Church" (Diamondbar, CA); Powerhouse Studios (Yonkers, NY); Sony Music Studios (New York, NY)
- Genres: Hip hop; R&B
- Length: 54:45
- Labels: Ruff Ryders; Interscope
- Producers: Bink!; Channel 7; Dr. Dre; Mike Elizondo; Eve; Amon Flanagan; Irv Gotti; Hot Runner; Jay "Icepick" Jackson; Neckbones; Francisco Pimental; Staxx; Scott Storch; Swizz Beatz; Teflon; Trackmasters

Eve chronology
Scorpion (2001)	Eve-Olution (2002)	Lip Lock (2013)

Singles from Eve-Olution
- 1. "Gangsta Lovin'" Released: July 23, 2002; 2. "Satisfaction" Released: February 25, 2003

Eve-Olution is the third studio album by American rapper Eve. It was released by Ruff Ryders Entertainment on August 27, 2002 in the United States, while distribution was overseen by Interscope Records. Production on Eve-Olution was handled by frequent collaborators Dr. Dre, Swizz Beatz and Irv Gotti. Additional production on the album was provided by Bink!, Channel 7, Trackmasters, Jay "Icepick" Jackson, and Scott Storch, among others.

The album earned largely positive reviews from music critics and debuted at number six on the US Billboard 200 with first-week sales of 133,000 copies; also reaching the top twenty in Canada, France, and Switzerland. For selling over 600,000 copies in the US, it was certified gold in sales by the Recording Industry Association of America (RIAA). Eve-Olution spawned the internationally successful single "Gangsta Lovin'", which reached number two on the Billboard Hot 100 and Hot R&B/Hip-Hop Songs charts as well as number four in Australia.

== Promotion ==
"Gangsta Lovin'" was released in September 2002 as the first single from the album. In the United States, it peaked at number two on both the Billboard Hot 100 (becoming Eve's second highest-charting song on the chart) and R&B/Hip-Hop Songs charts. Internationally, it peaked inside the top twenty in most countries such as Norway, New Zealand, Belgium, the UK and Switzerland, among others, except for Austria, where it peaked at forty-one.

"Satisfaction" was released as the second and final single from the album in late March 2003. It saw moderate success in the US, reaching at number twenty-seven on the Billboard Hot 100 chart and number twenty-two on the R&B/Hip-Hop chart. It debuted inside the top twenty in the UK, and dropped off the chart after four weeks. It was a minor hit in the Netherlands, where it only peaked at number eighty-seven.

== Critical reception ==
Professional ratings
Aggregate scores
Source	Rating
Metacritic	68/100
Review scores
Source	Rating
AllMusic	2.5/5 stars
Blender	3/5 stars
E! Online	B+
Entertainment Weekly	B+
IGN	8.5/10
NME	3.5/5 stars
Robert Christgau	(choice cut)
Rolling Stone	3/5 stars
Slant	3.5/5 stars

In a positive review, Entertainment Weekly writer said that Eve-Olution is a "more complex and sophisticated sound that dexterously mixes up moods and tones." He also stated that "instead of the record coming off like a pu-pu platter -- a little R&B from column A, a little pop from column B -- it maintains its focus, making it a wholly satisfying experience." Hope Gonzalez of IGN called the album a "smorgasbord of beats" because it "dapples in soul, electronic, and even salsa music to create yet another opus of hip-pop jingles." She also said "Gangsta Lovin'" is "quite different" from most of the tracks on the album because it is "the most radio-friendly track on the album."

Slant Magazine's Sal Cinquemani said "Eve fares better when the rhythms are sexy and the rhymes are slick". AllMusic noted that the "focus here is less hip-hop and more contemporary R&B, with fewer rappers invited as guests". He dismissed the songs "What" and "Gangsta Lovin'" as "surprisingly mediocre", adding that the guest vocalists are "vamping over bland choruses and Eve contributing only a few good rhymes." He compared the album to Eve's previous releases and claimed "Eve-Olution can't offer as much as either of her first two solid LPs." In contrast, Cinquemani said that "Eve's Eve-Olution might not change the order of the hip-hop food chain as we know it but it's another tight record that will undoubtedly keep her, um, rydin' high."

== Commercial performance ==
Eve-Olution debuted and peaked at number six on the US Billboard 200 and number one on the Top R&B/Hip-Hop Albums chart, with first-week sales of 122,000 copies. It also reached the top ten in Canada, and Switzerland. For domestic shipment figures of over 500,000 copies, it was certified Gold by the Recording Industry Association of America (RIAA) on November 18, 2002. By September 2006, Eve-Olution had sold 630,000 copies in the United States, according to Nielsen SoundScan. In 2013, the album also reached Silver status in the United Kingdom.

== Track listing ==
Eve-Olution track listing
No.	Title	Writer(s)	Producer(s)	Length
1.	"Intro"			1:24
2.	"What!" (featuring Truth Hurts)	Eve Jeffers; Shari Watson; Andre Young	Dr. Dre	3:19
3.	"Gangsta Lovin'" (featuring Alicia Keys)	Jonah Ellis; Lonnie Simmons; Alisa Yarbrough	Irv Gotti; Channel 7	3:59
4.	"Irresistible Chick"	Jeffers; Irving Lorenzo; Seven Aurelius	Gotti; Channel 7	3:34
5.	"Party in the Rain" (featuring Mashonda)	Jeffers; Mashonda Tiffrere; Kasseem Dean	Swizz Beatz	4:10
6.	"Argument" (Skit)		Eve; Jay "Icepick" Jackson	1:14
7.	"Let This Go"	Jeffers; Terrance Lovelace; Robert Waller	Hotrunner	4:12
8.	"Hey Y'all" (featuring Snoop Dogg and Nate Dogg)	Jeffers; Lovelace; Waller; Calvin Broadus; Nathanial Hale	Hotrunner	4:04
9.	"Figure You Out"	Jeffers; Samuel Barnes; Jean-Claude Olivier; Francisco Pimental	Pimental; Poke & Tone	3:14
10.	"Stop Hatin'" (Skit)		Eve; Jackson	1:43
11.	"Satisfaction"	Jeffers; Young; Mike Elizondo	Dr. Dre; Elizondo	4:18
12.	"Neckbones"	Jeffers; Amon Flanagan; Jean Baptiste; Wade Warner	Neckbones; Flanagan	3:55
13.	"Double R What" (featuring Jadakiss and Styles P)	Jeffers; Jeffers; Dean; David Styles; Jason Philips	Swizz Beatz	3:56
14.	"Ryde Away" (featuring Anthony Hamilton)	Jeffers; Roosevelt Harrell	Bink!	3:44
15.	"As I Grow"	Jeffers; Armique Wyche	Staxx	3:49
16.	"Eve-Olution"	Jeffers; Christian Ward	Teflon	3:59
Total length:				54:45

International bonus tracks
No.	Title	Writer(s)	Producer(s)	Length
17.	"Let Me Blow Ya Mind" (featuring Gwen Stefani)	Jeffers; Young; Elizondo; Scott Storch; Steven Jordan	Dr. Dre; Storch	3:50
18.	"U, Me & She"	Jeffers; Lorenzo; James Mtume	Gotti	3:52

Sample credits

- "Gangsta Lovin'" contains elements from "Don't Stop the Music" as written by Alisa Yarbrough, Jonah Ellis, and Lonnie Simmons.
- "Double R What" contains a sample of "P.S.K. What Does It Mean" as written by Jesse Weaver, Jr.
- "U, Me & She" contains a portion of the composition "You, Me and He" as written by James Mtume.

== Personnel ==
- Dee Dean – executive producer
- Waah Dean – executive producer
- Eve – producer, executive producer
- Jay "Icepick" Jackson – arranger, executive producer, producer
- Steve Stoute – production executive
- Drew Fitzgerald – creative director
- Larry Chatman – project coordinator
- Ekaterina Kenney – creative assistance
- Dr. Dre – producer, mixing
- Mike Elizondo – producer, guitar, keyboard, bass
- Irv Gotti – producer
- Hot Runner – producer
- Neckbones – producer
- Poke & Tone – producer
- Staxx – producer
- Swizz Beatz – producer
- Teflon – producer, additional vocals
- Larry Phillabaum – guitar, keyboards, mixing
- Steve Baughman – mixing
- Barry Goldstein – mixing
- Rich Keller – mixing
- Doug Wilson – mixing
- Brian Springer – mixing
- Gabe Chiesa – engineer
- Carlisle Young – engineer, vocal engineer
- Tom Rounds – assistant engineer
- Sam Story – assistant engineer
- Tony Dawsey – mastering
- Anthony Hamilton – vocals
- Tracie Spencer – background vocals
- Joe Zee – stylist
- Alexander Allen – stylist
- Michael Hart Thompson – photography
- Richard Page – make-up

== Charts ==
=== Weekly charts ===
Weekly chart performance for Eve-Olution
Chart (2002)	Peak position
Australian Albums (ARIA)	36
Australian Urban Albums (ARIA)	5
Austrian Albums (Ö3 Austria)	42
Belgian Albums (Ultratop Flanders)	39
Belgian Albums (Ultratop Wallonia)	42
Canadian Albums (Billboard)	8
Canadian R&B Albums (Nielsen SoundScan)	6
Dutch Albums (Album Top 100)	40
European Top 100 Albums (Music & Media)	22
French Albums (SNEP)	15
German Albums (Offizielle Top 100)	22
Japanese Albums (Oricon)	45
New Zealand Albums (RMNZ)	23
Norwegian Albums (VG-lista)	32
Scottish Albums (Official Charts)	90
Swedish Albums (Sverigetopplistan)	46
Swiss Albums (Schweizer Hitparade)	4
UK Albums (Official Charts)	47
UK R&B Albums (Official Charts)	13
US Billboard 200	6
US Top R&B/Hip-Hop Albums (Billboard)	1

=== Year-end charts ===
Year-end chart performance for Eve-Olution
Chart (2002)	Position
Canadian Albums (Nielsen SoundScan)	167
Canadian R&B Albums (Nielsen SoundScan)	30
Canadian Rap Albums (Nielsen SoundScan)	16
US Billboard 200	184
US Top R&B/Hip-Hop Albums (Billboard)	84

== Certifications ==
Certifications for Eve-Olution
Region	Certification	Certified units/sales
New Zealand (RMNZ)	Platinum	15,000^{‡}
United Kingdom (BPI)	Silver	60,000^{*}
United States (RIAA)	Gold	500,000^{^}
^{*} Sales figures based on certification alone.^{^} Shipments figures based on certification alone.

== Release history ==
Release history for Eve-Olution
Region	Date	Format	Label	Catalog
United States	August 27, 2002	CD, digital download	Interscope	B00006FR68
Canada	August 27, 2002	CD, digital download	Universal Music	B00006FR68
United Kingdom	May 26, 2003	CD, digital download	Spectrum	B00006HCKB
