= Gotta Man =

1999 single by Eve

Single by Eve

from the album Let There Be Eve...Ruff Ryders' First Lady
- Released: August 31, 1999
- Studio: Sony Music Studios
- Genre: Hip hop
- Length: 4:24
- Label: Ruff Ryders; Interscope
- Songwriters: Eve Jeffers; Kasseem Dean
- Producer: Swizz Beatz

Eve singles chronology
"What Ya Want" (1999)	"Gotta Man" (1999)	"Hot Boyz" (1999)

Music video
- "Gotta Man" on YouTube

"Gotta Man" is a song by American rapper Eve, released on August 31, 1999 as the second single from her debut studio album Let There Be Eve...Ruff Ryders' First Lady (1999). The song features American singer Mashonda and was produced by Swizz Beatz.

== Background ==
Swizz Beatz originally wrote the song for an intended collaboration with singer Aaliyah. However, according to him, their schedules and labels "didn't permit it". Swizz Beatz eventually collaborated with Eve for the song, stating that it "fit the vibe" of Let There Be Eve...Ruff Ryders' First Lady.

== Composition ==
The song features a guitar vamp, as well as "rattling drums and chiming strings" and a nursery rhyme chorus is sung by Mashonda. Eve declares her love and fidelity to a man, in a relationship that involves "bail money happily paid and secrets kept".

== Charts ==
Chart (1999–2000)	Peak position
US Billboard Hot 100	26
US Hot R&B/Hip-Hop Songs (Billboard)	10
US Hot Rap Songs (Billboard)	18
US Rhythmic Airplay (Billboard)	8
