= Scorpion (Eve album) =

Studio album by Eve
- Released: March 6, 2001
- Recorded: 2000
- Studios: Sony Music Studios (New York, NY); The Hit Factory Criteria (Miami, FL); Record One (Sherman Oaks, CA); Enterprise Studios (Burbank, CA); The Hit Factory (New York, NY); Soundtrack Studios (New York, NY)
- Genre: Hip hop
- Length: 57:26
- Labels: Ruff Ryders; Interscope
- Producers: Swizz Beatz; Jay "Icepick" Jackson; Dame Grease; DJ Shok; Dr. Dre; Stevie J; Stephen Marley; Scott Storch; Teflon; Eric McCaine

Eve chronology
Let There Be Eve...Ruff Ryders' First Lady (1999)	Scorpion (2001)	Eve-Olution (2002)

Singles from Scorpion
- 1. "Who's That Girl?" Released: February 5, 2001; 2. "Let Me Blow Ya Mind" Released: April 2, 2001

Scorpion is the second studio album by American rapper Eve. It was released by Ruff Ryders Entertainment and Interscope Records on March 6, 2001, in the United States. The album's title is a reference to Eve's zodiac sign, Scorpio. It features the hit single "Let Me Blow Ya Mind", a duet with Gwen Stefani of No Doubt, which won the first Grammy Award for Best Rap/Sung Collaboration (now Best Melodic Rap Performance), a new category at the time.

Scorpion was a critical and commercial success, debuting at number four on the US Billboard 200 with first-week sales of 162,000 copies and became her second consecutive number-one album on the Top R&B/Hip-Hop Albums chart. Scorpion was later certified Platinum by the Recording Industry Association of America (RIAA) on May 10, 2001, for shipments of one million copies. Scorpion was also nominated for Best Rap Album at the 44th Grammy Awards in 2002. As of 2007, it sold 1,500,000 units in the US.

== Reception ==
Professional ratings
Aggregate scores
Source	Rating
Metacritic	70/100
Review scores
Source	Rating
AllMusic	4/5 stars
Entertainment Weekly	A
NME	5/5 stars
Pitchfork	8.3/10
PopMatters	5/10
Robert Christgau	(dud)
Rolling Stone	3/5 stars
Spin	7/10
Wall of Sound	70/100
Yahoo! Music UK	5/10

David Browne of Entertainment Weekly gave the album an A, stating, "More than just a dramatic improvement over its predecessor, Scorpion is the first female hip hop project that even attempts to fill the void left by The Miseducation of Lauryn Hill." AllMusic editor Jason Birchmeier found that on the album "Eve brings even more muscle to her follow-up album, Scorpion. Her rhymes flow just as smoothly here as they did on her debut, and she sounds even more confident than before [...] At 16 tracks, this album doesn't overreach and really doesn't have too many surprises. There are a few flawed moments where the choruses aren't as catchy as they intend to be, but for the most part Eve plays it safe. If you liked her first album, you'll like this one even better."

== Track listing ==
Scorpion track listing
No.	Title	Writer(s)	Producer(s)	Length
1.	"Intro"	Eve Jeffers; Jay "Icepick" Jackson	Icepick	0:18
2.	"Cowboy"	Jeffers; Kasseem Dean; Mashonda Tifrere	Swizz Beatz	3:15
3.	"Who's That Girl?"	Jeffers; Darrin Dean; Jackson; Sheldon "Teflon" Harris	Teflon	4:42
4.	"Let Me Blow Ya Mind" (featuring Gwen Stefani)	Jeffers; Stefani; Andre Young; Scott Storch; Mike Elizondo; Steven Jordan	Dr. Dre; Storch	3:49
5.	"3 Way (Skit)" (featuring Erex and Stevie J)	Jeffers; Eric "Erex" Simms; Jordan; Jackson	Icepick	0:41
6.	"You Had Me, You Lost Me"	Jeffers; Jordan; James Calloway	Stevie J	4:21
7.	"Got What You Need" (featuring Drag-On and Swizz Beatz)	Jeffers; Mel Smalls; Dean; Eric McCaine	Swizz Beatz; McCaine	3:52
8.	"Frontin'" (Skit)	Jeffers, Jackson	Icepick	0:43
9.	"Gangsta Bitches" (featuring Da Brat and Trina)	Jeffers; Shauntae Harris; Katrina Taylor; Dean	Swizz Beatz	4:24
10.	"That's What It Is" (featuring Styles P)	Jeffers; David Styles; Young	Dr. Dre	3:40
11.	"Scream Double R" (featuring DMX)	Jeffers; Earl Simmons; Michael Gomez	DJ Shok	3:41
12.	"Thug in the Street" (featuring Drag-On and The LOX)	Jeffers; Smalls; Jason Phillips; Styles; Sean Jacobs; Dean	Swizz Beatz	5:02
13.	"No, No, No" (featuring Damian Marley and Stephen Marley)	Jeffers; D. Marley; S. Marley	S. Marley	5:37
14.	"You Ain't Gettin' None"	Jeffers; Damon Blackman	Dame Grease	4:14
15.	"Life Is So Hard" (featuring Teena Marie)	Jeffers; Mary Brockert; Jordan; Michael Gomez	DJ Shok; Stevie J (co.)	4:55
16.	"Be Me" (featuring Mashonda)	Jeffers; Tifrere; Gomez	DJ Shok	4:09
Total length:				57:26

Samples credits

- "You Had Me, You Lost Me" contains a portion of the composition "Over Like a Fat Rat" as written by James Calloway, Aaron Davenport, and Leroy Jackson.
- "No, No, No" features samples from the Dawn Penn recording "You Don't Love Me (No, No, No)".

== Charts ==
=== Weekly charts ===
Weekly chart performance for Scorpion
Chart (2001)	Peak position
Australian Albums (ARIA)	92
Australian Urban Albums (ARIA)	18
Austrian Albums (Ö3 Austria)	73
Canadian Albums (Billboard)	20
Canadian R&B Albums (Nielsen SoundScan)	4
Dutch Albums (Album Top 100)	34
European Top 100 Albums (Music & Media)	57
French Albums (SNEP)	37
German Albums (Offizielle Top 100)	32
Irish Albums (IRMA)	42
New Zealand Albums (RMNZ)	15
Norwegian Albums (VG-lista)	10
Scottish Albums (Official Charts)	37
Swiss Albums (Schweizer Hitparade)	41
UK Albums (Official Charts)	22
UK R&B Albums (Official Charts)	5
US Billboard 200	4
US Top R&B/Hip-Hop Albums (Billboard)	1

=== Year-end charts ===
Year-end chart performance for Scorpion
Chart (2001)	Position
Canadian Albums (Nielsen SoundScan)	66
Canadian R&B Albums (Nielsen SoundScan)	14
Canadian Rap Albums (Nielsen SoundScan)	5
UK Albums (OCC)	198
US Billboard 200	59
US Top R&B/Hip-Hop Albums (Billboard)	28

Chart (2002)	Position
Canadian R&B Albums (Nielsen SoundScan)	155
Canadian Rap Albums (Nielsen SoundScan)	79

== Certifications ==
Certifications for Scorpion
Region	Certification	Certified units/sales
Canada (Music Canada)	Platinum	100,000^{^}
France (SNEP)	Gold	100,000^{*}
New Zealand (RMNZ)	Gold	7,500^{^}
United Kingdom (BPI)	Gold	100,000^{‡}
United States (RIAA)	Platinum	1,500,000
^{*} Sales figures based on certification alone.^{^} Shipments figures based on certification alone.^{‡} Sales+streaming figures based on certification alone.
