= The Lox discography =

- Studio albums: 4
- Extended plays: 2
- Compilation albums: 1
- Singles: 15
- Mixtapes: 1

The discography of American hip hop group the Lox (under name D-Block), consists of four studio albums, one compilation album, two extended plays, one mixtape and fifteen singles (including five as a featured artist).

== Albums ==
=== Studio albums ===
List of studio albums, with selected chart positions and certifications
Title	Album details	Peak chart positions				Certifications
Title	Album details	US	US R&B	CAN	UK	Certifications
Money, Power & Respect	Released: January 13, 1998; Label: Bad Boy, Arista; Format: CD, LP, cassette, digital download	3	1	11	—	RIAA: Platinum; MC: Gold
We Are the Streets	Released: January 25, 2000; Label: Ruff Ryders, Interscope; Format: CD, LP, cassette, digital download	5	2	—	190	RIAA: Gold
Filthy America... It's Beautiful	Released: December 16, 2016; Label: D-Block, Roc Nation; Format: CD, LP, digital download	42	6	—	—	
Living Off Xperience	Released: August 28, 2020; Label: D-Block, Roc Nation; Format: CD, LP, digital download	154	—	—	—	
"—" denotes a recording that did not chart or was not released in that territory.

=== Compilation albums ===
List of compilation albums, with selected chart positions
Title	Album details	Peak chart positions			
Title	Album details	US	US Ind.	US R&B	US Rap
No Security	Released: June 9, 2009; Label: D-Block, E1 Music; Format: CD, digital download	40	5	6	3

== Extended plays ==
List of extended plays, with selected chart positions
Title	EP details	Peak chart positions		
Title	EP details	US	US R&B	US Rap
The Trinity	Released: December 18, 2013; Label: D-Block; Format: Digital download	141	17	8
The Trinity: 2nd Sermon	Released: November 5, 2014; Label: D-Block; Format: Digital download	—	—	—
#4NoReAsOn	Released: November 3, 2017; Label: D-Block; Format: Digital download	—	—	—

== Mixtapes ==
Title	Mixtape details
The Trinity: 3rd Sermon	Released: November 11, 2014; Label: Self-released; Format: Digital download

== Singles ==
=== As lead artist ===
List of singles as lead artist, with selected chart positions and certifications, showing year released and album name
Title	Year	Peak chart positions				Certifications	Album
Title	Year	US	US R&B	US Rap	NZ	Certifications	Album
"If You Think I'm Jiggy"	1998	30	21	9	16		Money, Power & Respect
"Money, Power & Respect" (featuring DMX and Lil' Kim)	1998	17	8	1	31	RIAA: Platinum	Money, Power & Respect
"Ryde or Die, Bitch" (featuring Eve and Timbaland)	1999	73	27	22	—		We Are the Streets
"Recognize"	2000	—	94	13	—		We Are the Streets
"Wild Out"	2000	—	64	—	—		We Are the Streets
"Get That Paper"	2009	—	—	—	—		No Security
"So Much Trouble" (featuring Beanie Sigel)	2009	—	—	—	—		No Security
"Faded" (featuring Tyler Woods)	2013	—	—	—	—		The Trinity
"All We Know"	2013	—	—	—	—		The Trinity
"New York City"	2014						—N/a
"Horror" (featuring Tyler Woods)	2014	—	—	—	—		The Trinity: 2nd Sermon
"Survior"	2014	—	—	—	—		The Trinity: 2nd Sermon
"Don't You Cry"	2016	—	—	—	—		Filthy America... It's Beautiful
"What Else You Need to Know"	2016	—	—	—	—		Filthy America... It's Beautiful
"The Family"	2017	—	—	—	—		Filthy America... It's Beautiful
"Loyalty & Love"	2020	—	—	—	—		Living Off Xperience
"The Game" (with Rick Ross and Fat Joe)	2023						—N/a
"—" denotes a recording that did not chart or was not released in that territory.

=== As featured artist ===
List of singles as featured artist, with selected chart positions, showing year released and album name
Title	Year	Peak chart positions							Album
Title	Year	US	US R&B	US Rap	BEL (FL)	NLD	SWE	UK	Album
"Just Wanna Please U (Remix)" [Mona Lisa featuring The Lox]	1996	`	`	`	`	`	`	`	Non-album single
"Honey (Bad Boy Remix)" [Mariah Carey featuring Puff Daddy, Mase and the Lox]	1997	1	2	2	30	—	8	3	Butterfly
"It's All About the Benjamins" (Remix) [Puff Daddy featuring The Notorious B.I.G., Lil' Kim and the Lox]	1997	2	7	1	58	25	51	18	No Way Out
"Ryde or Die" [Ruff Ryders featuring The Lox, Eve, DMX and Drag-On)	1999								Ryde or Die Vol. 1
"Reckless" (Trae tha Truth featuring the Lox)	2014	—	—	—	—	—	—	—	non-album single
"Gotti" (Lil Wayne featuring the Lox)	2014	—	—	—	—	—	—	—	non-album single
"3 on 3" (Capone-N-Noreaga featuring Tragedy Khadafi and the Lox)	2015	—	—	—	—	—	—	—	Lessons

== Other charted songs ==
List of other charted songs, with selected chart positions, showing year released and album name
Title	Year	Peak chart positions	Album
Title	Year	US R&B	Album
"We'll Always Love Big Poppa" (Note: "We'll Always Love Big Poppa" did not enter the Hot R&B/Hip-Hop Songs chart, but peaked at number 57 on the Hot R&B/Hip-Hop Airplay chart.)	1997	57	Money, Power & Respect

== Guest appearances ==
List of non-single guest appearances, with other performing artists, showing year released and album name
Title	Year	Other performer(s)	Album
"Bad Boy Freestyle"	1997	Funkmaster Flex, The Notorious B.I.G.	The Mix Tape, Vol. II
"Last Day"	1997	The Notorious B.I.G.	Life After Death
"Saturday Night"	1997	Zhané	Saturday Night
"Can't Get You off My Mind"	1997	Mary J. Blige	Share My World
"Live at the Tunnel"	1997	Cru	Da Dirty 30
"I Got the Power"	1997	Puff Daddy	No Way Out
"Usual Suspects"	1997	Mic Geronimo, DMX, Ja Rule, Tragedy Khadafi	Vendetta / How to Be a Player (soundtrack)
"24 Hrs. to Live"	1997	Mase, Black Rob, DMX	Harlem World
"You Got Me"	1997	LSG	Levert.Sweat.Gill
"Artifacts of Life"	1998	Rufus Blaq	Credentials
"Niggaz Done Started Something"	1998	DMX, Mase	It's Dark and Hell Is Hot / Woo (soundtrack)
"Reppin' Uptown"	1998	McGruff	Destined to Be
"Tommy's Theme"	1998	Made Men	Belly (soundtrack)/Classic Limited Edition
"Reservoir Dogs"	1998	Jay-Z, Beanie Sigel, Sauce Money	Vol. 2... Hard Knock Life
"My Niggaz"	1998	Kid Capri, Foxy Brown	Soundtrack to the Streets
"Blackout"	1998	DMX, Jay-Z	Flesh of My Flesh, Blood of My Blood
"Men of Respect"	1999	Kasino	The Corruptor (soundtrack)
"Dope Money"	1999	—N/a	Ryde or Die Vol. 1
"Scenario 2000"	1999	Eve, DMX, Drag-On	Let There Be Eve...Ruff Ryders' First Lady
"Bleeding from the Mouth"	1999	Capone-n-Noreaga	In Too Deep (soundtrack)
"D-X-L (Hard White)	1999	DMX, Drag-On	...And Then There Was X
"Can I Live"	2000	Black Rob	Life Story
"Ready for War"	2000	Drag-On	Opposite of H2O
"Who Did You Expect"	2000	DJ Clue?	Backstage: Music Inspired by the Film
"Go Head"	2000	—N/a	Ryde or Die Vol. 2
"Fantastic Four Pt. 2"	2001	DJ Clue?, Cam'ron, Nature, Fabolous	The Professional 2
"Bust Your Gun"	2001	—N/a	Exit Wounds (soundtrack)
"Thug in the Street"	2001	Eve, Drag-On	Scorpion
"None of Y'all Betta"	2001	Jadakiss	Kiss tha Game Goodbye
"Dirty Ryders"	2001	—N/a	Training Day (soundtrack)
"Keep Hustlin'"	2001	—N/a	Ryde or Die Vol. 3: In the "R" We Trust
"Lick Shots"	2002	Styles P	A Gangster and a Gentleman
"We Thugs (My Niggaz)"	2002	Styles P	A Gangster and a Gentleman
"Nobody Believes Me"	2002	Styles P	A Gangster and a Gentleman
"D Block"	2003	DJ Envy	The Desert Storm Mixtape: Blok Party, Vol. 1
"The Streetsweeper"	2003	DJ Kay Slay	The Streetsweeper, Vol. 1
"Don't Mean Nuthin'"	2003	Sheek Louch, J Hood	Walk witt Me
"The Essence"	2004	The Alchemist	1st Infantry
"Welcome to D-Block"	2004	Jadakiss, Eminem	Kiss of Death
"D.B.L.O.C.K.	2005	Funkmaster Flex	Car Show Tour
"Who Want a Problem (Remix)?"	2006	Styles P, Swizz Beatz	Time Is Money
"Gangster, Gangster"	2007	Styles P	Super Gangster (Extraordinary Gentleman)
"D-Block/Dipset"	2008	Sheek Louch, Jim Jones, Hell Rell	Silverback Gorilla
"Bodega Stories"	2010	Capone-N-Noreaga	The War Report 2: Report the War
"Dinner Guest"	2010	Sheek Louch	Donnie G: Don Gorilla
"Clip Up (Reloaded)"	2010	Sheek Louch	Donnie G: Don Gorilla
"Cocaine Trafficking"	2010	Sheek Louch	Donnie G: Don Gorilla
"Put Some Money On It"	2011	Slaughterhouse	Slaughterhouse
"All in Together"	2012	Ghostface Killah, Sheek Louch	Wu Block
"Who You Mad At?"	2013	Funkmaster Flex	Who You Mad At? Me or Yourself?
"All a Dream"	2014	Mobb Deep	The Infamous Mobb Deep
"But You Don't Hear Me Tho"	2017	Statik Selektah, James Mtume	8
"Fam 1st"	2017	Styles P, Berner	Vibes
"Load My Gun"	2018	Dave East	Beloved
"Against All Opps"	2019	DJ Kayslay, Outlawz	Hip Hop Frontline
"That’s My Dog"	2021	DMX	Exodus
"Jesus Lord, Pt. 2"	2021	Kanye West, Jay Electronica	Donda

== See also ==
- Jadakiss discography
- Styles P discography
- Sheek Louch discography
