= Styles P discography =

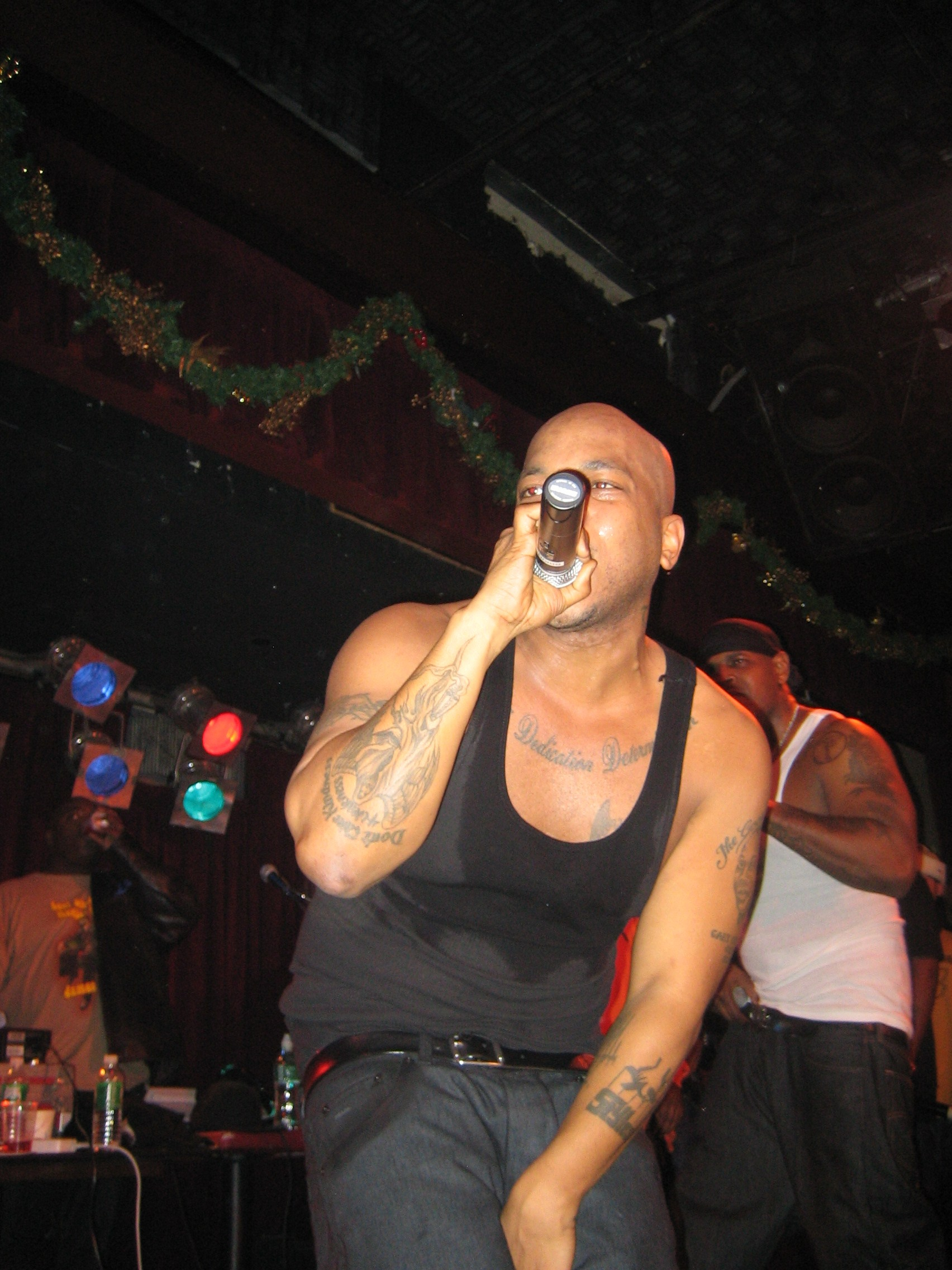
- Studio albums: 15
- Extended plays: 2
- Singles: 30
- Mixtapes: 16
- Collaborative albums: 5

The discography of Styles P, an American hip hop recording artist, consists of fifteen solo studio albums, two extended plays, sixteen mixtapes, 5 collaborative albums, 30 singles and one promotional single.

== Albums ==
=== Studio albums ===
List of studio albums, with selected chart positions and certifications
Title	Album details	Peak chart positions			Certifications
Title	Album details	US	US R&B	US Rap	Certifications
A Gangster and a Gentleman	Released: July 9, 2002; Label: Ruff Ryders, Interscope; Format: CD, LP, cassette, digital download	6	2	—	RIAA: Gold
Time is Money	Released: December 19, 2006; Label: Ruff Ryders, Interscope; Format: CD, LP, digital download	79	19	10	
Super Gangster (Extraordinary Gentleman)	Released: December 4, 2007; Label: D-Block, Koch; Format: CD, digital download	52	7	4	
Master of Ceremonies	Released: October 4, 2011; Label: D-Block, E1 Music; Format: CD, digital download	33	5	5	
The World's Most Hardest MC Project	Released: November 19, 2012; Label: D-Block, E1 Music; Format: CD, digital download	—	35	19	
Float	Released: April 16, 2013; Label: High Times, Nature Sounds; Format: CD, LP, digital download	124	17	14	
Phantom and the Ghost	Released: April 29, 2014; Label: Phantom, New Music Cartel, Empire; Format: CD, digital download	74	14	11	
A Wise Guy and a Wise Guy	Released: August 14, 2015; Label: Phantom; Format: CD, digital download	—	—	—	
G-Host	Released: May 4, 2018; Label: Phantom; Format: CD, digital download	166	—	—	
Dime Bag	Released: November 2, 2018; Label: Phantom, Empire; Format: CD, digital download	—	—	—	
S.P. the GOAT: Ghost of All Time	Released: May 3, 2019; Label: Phantom, Empire; Format: CD, LP, digital download	—	—	—	
Presence	Released: November 15, 2019; Label: Phantom, Empire; Format: Digital download	—	—	—	
Styles David: Ghost Your Enthusiasm	Released: May 22, 2020; Label: Phantom, Empire; Format: Digital download	—	—	—	
Ghosting	Released: July 9, 2021; Label: SHR, Empire; Format: Digital download	—	—	—	
Penultimate: A Calm Wolf Is Still a Wolf	Released: January 27, 2023; Label: Phantom, Empire; Format: Digital download	—	—	—	
"—" denotes a recording that did not chart or was not released in that territory.

=== Collaborative albums ===
List of collaborative albums, with selected chart positions
Title	Album details	Peak chart positions		
Title	Album details	US	US R&B	US Rap
The Green Ghost Project (with DJ Green Lantern)	Released: February 2, 2010; Label: Invasion; Format: CD, digital download	—	44	16
The Seven (with Talib Kweli)	Released: April 14, 2017; Label: Javotti Media, 3D; Format: CD, digital download	195	—	—
Vibes (with Berner)	Released: June 23, 2017; Label: Bern One; Format: Digital download	—	—	—
Beloved (with Dave East)	Released: October 5, 2018; Label: Def Jam; Format: Digital download	70	35	—
Wreckage Manner (with Havoc)	Released: December 3, 2021; Label: Phantom, MNRK; Format: LP, digital download	—	—	—
"—" denotes a recording that did not chart or was not released in that territory.

== Mixtapes ==
Title	Mixtape details
Ghost Stories – The World According to P	Released: 2004; Label: Self-released; Format: Digital download
Ghost in the Shell	Released: April 10, 2004; Label: Self-released; Format: Digital download
The Ghost in the Machine	Released: September 28, 2005; Label: Self-released; Format: Digital download
The Ghost That Sat by the Door	Released December 23, 2006; Label: Self-released; Format: Digital download
The Phantom	Released: April 5, 2007; Label: Self-released; Format: Digital download
The Ghost Sessions	Released: May 22, 2007; Label: Self-released; Format: Digital download
The Phantom Menace	Released: October 10, 2007; Label: Self-released; Format: Digital download
Phantom Ghost Menace	Released: July 26, 2008; Label: Self-released; Format: Digital download
Phantom Empire	Released: March 27, 2009; Label: Self-released; Format: Digital download
The Ghost Dub-Dime	Released: May 18, 2010; Label: Self-released; Format: Digital download
The Invincible Novel Soundtrack	Released: July 8, 2010; Label: Self-released; Format: Digital download
#The1st28 (with Currensy)	Released: February 28, 2012; Label: Self-released; Format: Digital download
The Diamond Life Project	Released: August 23, 2012; Label: Self-released; Format: Digital download
Ghost Trey Bags	Released: June 19, 2017; Label: Self-released; Format: Digital download
Ghost Kill Block Fear (with Nino Man)	Released: December 10, 2017; Label: Self-released; Format: Digital download
Nickel Bag	Released: March 30, 2018; Label: Self-released; Format: Digital download

== Singles ==
=== As lead artist ===
List of singles, with selected chart positions, showing year released and album name
Title	Year	Peak chart positions				Album
Title	Year	US	US R&B	US Rap	UK	Album
"The Life" (featuring Pharaohe Monch)	2002	—	66	—	50	Soundbombing III/A Gangster and a Gentleman
"Good Times"	2002	22	6	8	—	A Gangster and a Gentleman
"Can You Believe It" (featuring Akon)	2006	—	32	23	—	Time Is Money
"I'm Black" (featuring Marsha Ambrosius)	2006	—	94	—	—	Time Is Money
"Blow Ya Mind" (featuring Swizz Beatz)	2007	—	51	19	—	Super Gangster (Extraordinary Gentleman)
"Gangster, Gangster" (featuring The L.O.X.)	2008	—	—	—	—	Super Gangster (Extraordinary Gentleman)
"Stand Up (The Sean Bell Tribute Song)" (with Swizz Beatz, Maino, Cassidy, Talib Kweli and Drag-On)	2008	—	—	—	—	Non-album single
"Send a Kite" (featuring Dwayne Collins)	2010	—	—	—	—	The Green Ghost Project
"That Street Life" (featuring Tyler Woods)	2010	—	—	—	—	The Ghost Dub-Dime
"It's OK" (featuring Jadakiss)	2011	—	—	—	—	Master of Ceremonies
"Harsh" (featuring Rick Ross and Busta Rhymes)	2011	—	118	—	—	Master of Ceremonies
"I Know"	2012	—	—	—	—	The World's Most Hardest MC Project
"Hater Love"	2013	—	—	—	—	Float
"Sour" (featuring Jadakiss and Rocko)	2014	—	—	—	—	Phantom and the Ghost
"—" denotes a recording that did not chart or was not released in that territory.

=== As featured artist ===
List of singles, with selected chart positions, showing year released and album name
Title	Year	Peak chart positions			Certifications	Album
Title	Year	US	US R&B	US Rap	Certifications	Album
"Banned from T.V." (N.O.R.E. featuring Big Pun, Nature, Cam'ron, Jadakiss and Styles P)	1998	—	—	—		N.O.R.E.
"We Gonna Make It" (Jadakiss featuring Styles P)	2001	—	53	5		Kiss tha Game Goodbye
"Jenny from the Block" (Jennifer Lopez featuring Jadakiss and Styles P)	2002	3	22	—	BPI: Gold	This Is Me... Then
"Locked Up" (Akon featuring Styles P)	2004	8	6	—	RIAA: Gold; BPI: Platinum	Trouble
"Kiss Your Ass Goodbye" (Sheek Louch featuring Styles P)	2005	—	—	—		After Taxes
"B.M.F. (Blowin' Money Fast)" (Rick Ross featuring Styles P)	2010	60	6	4	RIAA: Platinum	Teflon Don
"Black Hand Side" (Pharoahe Monch featuring Styles P and Phonte)	2011	—	—	—		W.A.R. (We Are Renegades)
"It Ain't Easy" (Divine Bars featuring Styles P)	2011	—	—	—		Non-album single
"That's Hard" (Smif-N-Wessun & Pete Rock featuring Styles P and Sean Price)	2011	—	—	—		Monumental
"Set In Stone" (Yobi featuring Styles P and Jadakiss)	2011	—	—	—		Non-album singles
"Razor" (J the S featuring Styles P and P.Dub)	2012	—	—	—		Non-album singles
"Google That" (N.O.R.E. featuring Styles P and Raekwon)	2012	—	—	—		Crack On Steroids
"Not Like Them" (Saigon featuring Styles P)	2012	—	—	—		The Greatest Story Never Told Chapter 2: Bread and Circuses
"Chase the Paper" (50 Cent featuring Prodigy, Styles P and Kidd Kidd)	2014	—	—	—		Animal Ambition
"I'm On 3.0" (Trae tha Truth featuring T.I., Dave East, Tee Grizzley, Royce da 5'9", Curren$y, DRAM, Snoop Dogg, Fabolous, Rick Ross, Chamillionaire, G-Eazy, Styles P, E-40, Mark Morrison and Gary Clark, Jr.)	2017	—	—	—		Tha Truth, Pt. 3
"Time for Change (Black Lives Matter)" (Trae tha Truth featuring T.I., Styles P, Mysonne, Ink, Anthony Hamilton, Conway the Machine, Krayzie Bone, E-40, David Banner, Bun B, Tamika Mallory and Lee Merritt)	2020	—	—	—		non-album single

== Guest appearances ==
List of non-single guest appearances, with other performing artists, showing year released and album name
Title	Year	Other artist(s)	Album
"Ruff Ryders' Anthem (Remix)"	1998	DJ Clue?, DMX, Drag-On, Eve, Jadakiss	The Professional
"We Don't Give a Fuck"	1998	DMX, Jadakiss	Flesh of My Flesh, Blood of My Blood
"Drag Shit"	2000	Drag-On	Opposite of H2O
"Holiday"	2000	Jadakiss	Ryde or Die Vol. 2
"Live from the Streets"	2001	Angie Martinez, Jadakiss, Beanie Sigel, Brett, Kool G Rap	Up Close and Personal
"Come Thru"	2001	N.O.R.E.	Violator: The Album, V2.0
"That's What It Is"	2001	Eve	Scorpion
"Eastside Ryders"	2001	Tha Eastsidaz	Ryde or Die Vol. 3: In the "R" We Trust
"I'm Not You"	2002	Clipse, Roscoe P. Coldchain, Jadakiss	Lord Willin'
"Double R What"	2002	Eve, Jadakiss	Eve-Olution
"Knockin Heads Off"	2002	Lil Jon & the East Side Boyz, Jadakiss	Kings of Crunk
"What, Where, Why, When"	2003	DJ Envy	The Desert Storm Mixtape: Blok Party, Vol. 1
"Keepin It Gangsta (Remix)"	2003	Fabolous, Jadakiss, M.O.P., Paul Cain	Street Dreams
"Get in Touch with Us"	2003	Lil' Kim	La Bella Mafia
"I Got U"	2003	DJ Kay Slay, Bristol	The Streetsweeper, Vol. 1
"Shot Down"	2003	DMX, 50 Cent	Grand Champ
"In/Out (S.P.)"	2003	Sheek Louch	Walk witt Me
"How I Love You"	2003	Sheek Louch	Walk witt Me
"Pop That Cannon"	2004	Cassidy	Split Personality
"Respect My Gangsta"	2004	Drag-On	Hell and Back
"Metal Lungies"	2004	Ghostface Killah, Sheek Louch	The Pretty Toney Album
"From D-Block to QB"	2004	The Alchemist, Havoc, Big Noyd, J-Hood	1st Infantry
"Karaoke Night"	2004	Jin	The Rest Is History
"Shoot Outs"	2004	Jadakiss	Kiss of Death
"Kiss of Death"	2004	Jadakiss	Kiss of Death
"We Gonna Win"	2005	Miri Ben-Ari	The Hip-Hop Violinist
"Run Up"	2005	Sheek Louch	After Taxes
"I'm Hi"	2005	T-Pain	Rappa Ternt Sanga
"Ghetto Children"	2005	Cross, Infa-red, Snypah, Bunny Wailer	Vol. 4: The Redemption
"Push It (Remix)"	2006	Rick Ross, Bun B, Jadakiss, Game	—N/a
"Watch Out"	2006	DJ Khaled, Akon, Fat Joe, Rick Ross	Listennn... the Album
"It's Personal"	2006	DMX, Jadakiss	Year of the Dog... Again
"One Blood (Remix)"	2006	Game, Jim Jones, Snoop Dogg, Nas, T.I., Fat Joe, Lil Wayne, N.O.R.E., Jadakiss, Fabolous, Juelz Santana, Rick Ross, Twista, Kurupt, Daz Dillinger, WC, E-40, Bun B, Chamillionaire, Slim Thug, Young Dro, Clipse, Ja Rule, Junior Reid	Doctor's Advocate
"Blown Away"	2006	Akon	Konvicted
"The Animal"	2006	DJ Clue	The Professional 3
"Move Like a G"	2007	Red Café, Uncle Murda	The Co-Op
"Craaaazzzyy"	2007	DJ Absolut, Papoose, J.R. Writer, Hell Rell, Rick Ross	A Case of Supply & Demand
"Smile"	2007	Trae, Jadakiss	Life Goes On
"Sour Diesel"	2007	N.O.R.E.	Noreality
"Stop, Look, Listen"	2007	Statik Selektah, Termanology, Q-Tip	Spell My Name Right: The Album
"Toney Sigel A.K.A. the Barrel Brothers"	2007	Ghostface Killah, Beanie Sigel	The Big Doe Rehab
"U Ain't Ready 4 Me"	2007	Beanie Sigel	The Solution
"Rubber Grip"	2008	Sheek Louch, Fat Joe	Silverback Gorilla
"Rising Down"	2008	The Roots, Mos Def	Rising Down
"One More Step"	2009	Jadakiss	The Last Kiss
"The People"	2009	Jadakiss	Kiss My Ass (The Champ Is Here Pt. 2)
"Broken Safety"	2009	Raekwon, Jadakiss	Only Built 4 Cuban Linx... Pt. II
"Pimpin' Ain't Easy"	2009	DJ Drama, La the Darkman, Bun B, Jovan Dais	Gangsta Grillz: The Album (Vol. 2)
"Who's Real (Ruff Ryders Remix)"	2009	Jadakiss, Sheek Louch, Eve, Drag-On, DMX, Swizz Beatz	—N/a
"You Heard of Us"	2010	DJ Kay Slay, Sheek Louch, Ray J	More Than Just a DJ
"Top 5 Dead or Alive"	2010	Jadakiss	The Champ Is Here 3
"Unexplainable"	2010	Lloyd Banks	H.F.M. 2 (Hunger for More 2)
"Move a Little Different"	2010	Fred the Godson	Armageddon
"Dinner Guest"	2010	Sheek Louch, Jadakiss, Bully	Donnie G: Don Gorilla
"Clip Up (Reloaded)"	2010	Sheek Louch, Jadakiss	Donnie G: Don Gorilla
"Married 2 tha Game"	2010	Teflon	DJ Premier Presents Get Used To Us
"Ain't the One"	2011	La the Darkman, Maino	Embabassy Invasion
"Lay Em Down"	2011	Jadakiss	I Love You (A Dedication to My Fans)
"Go 'N' Get It (Remix)"	2011	Ace Hood, Beanie Sigel, Busta Rhymes, Pusha T	—N/a
"Dead Rapper"	2011	Tony Yayo, Problemz, Desperado	Meyer Lansky
"Ribbon in the Sky"	2011	Drag-On	The Crazies 3
"New York New York"	2011	Statik Selektah, Saigon	Population Control
"Black Vikings"	2011	Immortal Technique, Vinnie Paz, Poison Pen	The Martyr
"You Lift Me"	2011	That Kid Era	Let's Get It
"B.E.T."	2011	Fabolous, Jadakiss	There Is No Competition 3: Death Comes in 3s
"Gangsta Cazals"	2012	Raekwon, JD Era, Camoflauge	Unexpected Victory
"Keys to the Crib"	2012	Rick Ross	Rich Forever
"So What"	2012	Sheek Louch	—N/a
"Money Money"	2012	Cassidy	—N/a
"Put That on Everythang"	2012	8Ball, Trae tha Truth, Ebony Love	Premro
"Still I Hear the Word Progress"	2012	Lushlife	Plateau Vision
"Who I Am"	2012	Fiend	—N/a
"Shot Caller (Remix)"	2012	French Montana, Jadakiss, Red Cafe, Fat Joe, Uncle Murda	—N/a
"Bar R Us"	2012	Ananamuss	Str8 From Da Horse's Mouf
"Like That (Remix)"	2012	Papoose, 2 Chainz	—N/a
"Paper Tags"	2012	Jadakiss, Wale, French Montana	Consignment
"Hustle Like a Muh"	2012	Jadakiss, Ace Hood	Consignment
"Dope Boy"	2012	Jadakiss	Consignment
"Count It"	2012	Jadakiss, 2 Chainz	Consignment
"We Getting Money"	2012	Jadakiss, Trae tha Truth	Consignment
"Body Down"	2012	Jaecyn Bayne, Kojoe	Audio Therapy
"Colores (Remix)"	2012	Emicida, Freddie Gibbs	—N/a
"Fly Pelican (Remix)"	2012	A-Wax, French Montana, Chinx Drugz	—N/a
"WOH"	2012	Curren$y	Cigarette Boats
"Sour"	2012	Yukmouth	Half Baked
"Nathan"	2012	Azealia Banks	Fantasea
"Support"	2012	38 Spesh	Time Served
"Miss Me with the Bullshit"	2012	Jahbari, 2 Chainz	Me (Music=Everything)
"Phone Home"	2012	Trademark da Skydiver, Curren$y	Flamingo Barnes
"8 Is Enough"	2012	DJ OP, Papoose, A-Mafia, Capone, Uncle Murda, Push, J.R. Writer	—N/a
"Ask About Me"	2012	Kevlaar 7 & Woodenchainz, Bronze Nazareth	—N/a
"Sleep Walking"	2012	Berner	Urban Farmer
"Bloodsport"	2012	Frenchie, Joffy	Concrete Jungle 2
"Dead"	2012	Corner Boy P	Money Neva Sleep 2
"Better"	2012	Q Parker	MANual
"Boss Dealings"	2012	Curren$y, N.O.R.E.	Priest Andretti
"Play Dirty"	2012	Termanology, Lil' Fame, Busta Rhymes	Fizzyology
"Gateway to Wizardry"	2012	Action Bronson	Rare Chandeliers
"Bang Bang"	2012	Cassidy, Jag, Masspike Miles	—N/a
"Salute Me"	2012	DJ Kay Slay, Fred the Godson, Maino	Grown Man Hip-Hop
"Guns for Life"	2012	Ghostface Killah, Sheek Louch	Wu Block
"Cocaine Central"	2012	Ghostface Killah, Sheek Louch	Wu Block
"Comin for Ya Head"	2012	Ghostface Killah, Sheek Louch, Raekwon	Wu Block
"All in Together"	2012	Ghostface Killah, Sheek Louch, Jadakiss	Wu Block
"Rock Roll"	2012	Warchyld	The Streets Is Back
"Cut It Cut It (Remix)"	2012	Mr. Melody, Bolo	Contagion
"Stay in Your Place"	2013	C-Money	—N/a
"It Ain't Easy"	2013	Pat Gallo, Robb G	Fly Life Ep.1
"The Watchmen"	2013	Nino Bless, Cambatta, Crooked I	R.O.A.M. 2: The Greater Fool
"Back to tha Front"	2013	Mistah F.A.B., Blast Holiday	I Found My Backpack 3
"Bullet Proof"	2013	DJ Kay Slay, Raekwon, Sheek Louch	Grown Man Hip Hop Part 2 (Sleepin' with the Enemy)
"Supa Hard"	2013	Torch, Ameer	Tax Season
"About That Life"	2013	Shawn Pen, Malik Yusef	—N/a
"Drive"	2013	Currensy, Young Roddy	New Jet City
"Snakeskin Down"	2013	La the Darkman, Bun B	Diary of a Playboy 2
"All Js"	2013	Jadakiss, Bow Wow	—N/a
"Devil (Remix)"	2013	Tahiry, Uncle Murda	—N/a
"No Apologies"	2013	Fiend	Lil Ghetto Boy
"Fuck Dat"	2013	Ransom, Lore'L	The Alternative
"3 the Hardway"	2013	Young Roddy, Smoke DZA	Good Sense 2
"In and Out"	2013	Funkmaster Flex, Jadakiss	Who You Mad At? Me or Yourself?
"Favorite Rap Stars"	2013	Havoc, Raekwon	13
"Cruising USA"	2013	Blanco, The Jacka, Freddie Gibbs	Game Over
"Funeral Season"	2013	Statik Selektah, Bun B, Hit-Boy	Extended Play
"Lean on Em"	2013	Emilio Rojas, Iamsu!, Troy Ave	No Shame, No Regrets
"The Sound of NYC"	2013	DJ Kay Slay, Sheek Louch, Vado	The Last Champion
"Bars"	2013	Tony Touch, Sheek Louch, Jadakiss	The Piece Maker 3: Return of the 50 MC's
"Fame"	2013	U-God	The Keynote Speaker
"Fired Up"	2013	Kid Ink	—N/a
"Malaria"	2013	Torch, Fred the Godson	No A/C 2
"Cover Me"	2013	Lloyd Banks	A.O.N. (All Or Nothing) Series Vol. 1: F.N.O. (Failure's No Option)
"The Myth"	2013	The Alchemist	The Cutting Room Floor 3
"No Hesitation"	2014	Step Brothers	Lord Steppington
"When We Ride"	2014	DJ Kay Slay, Sheek Louch, Uncle Murda	The Rise of a City
"Murda Barz"	2014	DJ OP, Young Buck, Uncle Murda	I Refuse to Lose
"Chase the Paper"	2014	50 Cent, Kidd Kidd, Prodigy	Animal Ambition
"MARS (The Dream Team)"	2014	Cormega, AZ, Redman	Mega Philosophy
"Keep Calm RMX"	2014	DJ Kay Slay, French Montana, Rico Love, Chinx, Gooney, Sheek Louch	The Last Hip Hop Disciple
"Alert"	2015	Curren$y	Pilot Talk III
"Top Tier"	2015	Statik Selektah, Sean Price, Bun B	Lucky 7
"Arizona"	2015	Dave East	Hate Me Now
"Everything Lit"	2015	Dave East, Jadakiss	Hate Me Now
"BlockWork"	2015	Jadakiss	#T5DOA: Freestyle Edition
"Everyday (Amor)"	2015	Puff Daddy, Jadakiss, Pusha T, Tish Hyman	MMM (Money Making Mitch)
"Auction"	2015	Puff Daddy, Lil Kim, King Los	MMM (Money Making Mitch)
"Synergy"	2015	Jadakiss	Top 5 Dead or Alive
"Rain"	2015	Jadakiss, Nas	Top 5 Dead or Alive
"What It Is"	2015	Sheek Louch	Silverback Gorilla 2
"Real Talk"	2016	Lyfe Crisis	—N/a
"Have Mercy"	2016	French Montana, Beanie Sigel, Jadakiss	MC4
"Freestyle"	2016	Joe Budden	—N/a
"I Dream B.I.G."	2016	Termanology, Sheek Louch	More Politics
"Milestone"	2016	Pete Rock, Smoke DZA, BJ The Chicago Kid, Jadakiss	Don't Smoke Rock
"Land of Opportunity"	2016	Lloyd Banks	All Or Nothing: Live it Up
"Take Me There"	2017	The Notorious B.I.G., Faith Evans, Sheek Louch	The King & I
"Super Predator"	2017	Joey Bada$$	All-Amerikkan Bada$$
"The 3 Lyrical Ps"	2017	Sean Price, Prodigy	Imperius Rex
"Ice Pick"	2017	Fabolous, Jadakiss	Friday on Elm Street
"Lights Glowing"	2017	DJ Kay Slay, Scarface, Sheek Louch	The Big Brother
"Something Dirty/Pic Got Us"	2018	Swizz Beatz, Kendrick Lamar, Jadakiss	POISON
"Lights Glowing"	2018	DJ Kay Slay, Scarface, Sheek Louch	The Big Brother
"Making a Murderer"	2018	Black Thought	Streams of Thought, Vol. 1
"The Irishman"	2019	Nicholas Craven	Craven N 2
"Rocwell's America"	2020	Sa-Roc	The Sharecropper's Daughter
"Salute"	2021	Russ, Westside Gunn	Chomp 2
"No Ennemy"	2023	Benjamin Epps	La Grande Désillusion
"Curtis May"	2025	Ghostface Killah, Conway The Machine	Supreme Clientele 2
"Man may not last"	2026	Standing On The Corner, Ladybug Mecca	Standing on the Corner "II"

== Music videos ==
Year	Song	Director	Album
2002	"Good Times (I Get High)"	Jessy Terrero	A Gangster and a Gentleman
2002	"The Life"	Deric Margolis	A Gangster and a Gentleman
2007	"Blow Your Mind"	Todd Angkasuwan & Styles P	Super Gangster (Extraordinary Gentleman)
2011	"Its Over"	Fabrizio Conte	The Ghost Dub-Dime
2011	"Where The Angels Sleep"	Fabrizio Conte	War Music
2011	"It's Ok" (featuring Jadakiss)	Fabrizio Conte	Master of Ceremonies
2011	"Harsh"	Fabrizio Conte	Master of Ceremonies
2012
2012	"Araab Styles"	Raafi Rivero	The World's Most Hardest MC Project
"I Know"	Dan The Man		The World's Most Hardest MC Project

== See also ==
- The Lox discography
