= Sheek Louch discography =

- Studio albums: 6

This is the discography of Sheek Louch, an American rapper from Yonkers, New York.

== Albums ==
=== Studio albums ===
List of studio albums, with selected chart positions
Title	Album details	Peak chart positions		
Title	Album details	US	US R&B	US Rap
Walk witt Me	Released: September 16, 2003; Label: D-Block, Universal; Format: CD, digital download	9	3	—
After Taxes	Released: November 8, 2005; Label: D-Block, Koch; Format: CD, digital download	23	3	2
Silverback Gorilla	Released: March 18, 2008; Label: D-Block, Koch; Format: CD, digital download	41	8	5
Life on D-Block	Released: May 19, 2009; Label: D-Block, Real Talk; Format: CD, digital download	122	26	13
Donnie G: Don Gorilla	Released: December 14, 2010; Label: D-Block, Def Jam; Format: CD, digital download	—	43	17
Silverback Gorilla 2	Released: December 4, 2015; Label: D-Block, Tommy Boy; Format: CD, digital download	—	43	—

=== Collaborative albums ===
List of collaborative albums, with selected chart positions
Title	Album details	Peak chart positions		
Title	Album details	US	US R&B	US Rap
Wu Block (with Ghostface Killah)	Released: November 27, 2012; Label: E1 Music; Format: CD, digital download	73	15	9

== Mixtapes ==
Title	Mixtape details
Year of the Wolf	Released: Spring, 2005; Label: D-Block; Format: CD, digital download
Still a Wolf	Released: February 18, 2006; Label: D-Block; Format: CD, digital download
The Howling	Released: December 22, 2007; Label: D-Block; Format: CD, digital download
Donnie Def Jam: Guerilla Warfare Vol. 1	Released: October 2, 2010; Label: D-Block; Format: CD, digital download
Gorillaween	Released: October 31, 2015; Label: D-Block; Format: CD, digital download
BeastMode, Vol. 1	Released: May 15, 2018; Label: D-Block; Format: CD, digital download
BeastMode, Vol. 2	Released: August 1, 2018; Label: D-Block; Format: CD, digital download
BeastMode, Vol. 3	Released: May 17, 2019; Label: D-Block; Format: CD, digital download
Gorillaween, Vol. 2	Released: October 31, 2019; Label: D-Block; Format: CD, digital download
BeastMode 4	Released: October 16, 2020; Label: D-Block; Format: CD, digital download
Gorillaween, Vol. 3	Released: October 31, 2020; Label: D-Block; Format: CD, digital download
Gorillaween 4	Released: October 28, 2022; Label: D-Block; Format: CD, digital download
BeastMode 5	Released: November 18, 2022; Label: D-Block; Format: CD, digital download
Gorillaween 5	Released: October 27, 2023; Label: D-Block; Format: CD, digital download
Gorillaween V.6	Released: October 25, 2024; Label: D-Block; Format: CD, digital download
Gorillaween V.7	Released: October 24, 2025; Label: D-Block; Format: CD, digital download
Gorillaween Vol. 8	Released: November 1, 2026; Label: D-Block; Format: CD, digital download

== Singles ==
=== As lead artist ===
Year	Song	Chart positions		Album
Year	Song	U.S. R&B	U.S. Rap	Album
2003	"Mighty D-Block (2 Guns Up)" (featuring D-Block & J-Hood)	65	–	Walk witt Me
2003	"OK"	92	–	Walk witt Me
2005	"Kiss Your Ass Goodbye" (featuring Styles P)	–	–	After Taxes
2005	"One Name" (featuring Carl Thomas)	71	–	After Taxes
2008	"Good Love"	66	21	Silverback Gorilla
2008	"Keep Pushin'" (featuring Mike Smith)	–	–	Silverback Gorilla
2009	"Time 2 Get Paid"	–	–	Life on D-Block
2010	"Party After 2" (featuring Jeremih)	–	–	Donnie G: Don Gorilla

=== As featured artist ===
Year	Song	Chart positions			Album
Year	Song	U.S.	U.S. R&B	U.S. Rap	Album
1998	"Get at Me Dog" (DMX featuring Sheek Louch)	39	19	6	It's Dark and Hell Is Hot
2012	"Mad Work" (D-Block featuring Sheek Louch)	–	–	–	Road Killa

== Guest appearances ==
Title	Year	Other artist(s)	Album
"Set It Off"	1994	Main Source, Jadakiss, Lotto and Shaqueen	Fuck What You Think
"Get at Me Dog"	1998	DMX	It's Dark and Hell Is Hot
"Ryde or Die"	1999	Jadakiss, Styles P, Eve, Drag-On and DMX	Ryde or Die Vol. 1
"Piña Colada"	1999	Big Pun	Ryde or Die Vol. 1
"2 Tears in a Bucket"	2000	Method Man & Redman	Ryde or Die Vol. 2
"Go Head"	2000	Styles P and Jadakiss	Ryde or Die Vol. 2
"None of Y'all Betta"	2001	Jadakiss and Styles P	Kiss tha Game Goodbye
"Jay Jerkin' (Skit)"	2001	Jadakiss and Styles P	Kiss tha Game Goodbye
"It's Time I See You"	2001	Jadakiss, Styles P, Drag-On, Eve, Infa-Red and Cross	Kiss tha Game Goodbye
"And I Came To..."	2002	Styles P and Eve	A Gangster and a Gentleman
"Nobody Believes Me"	2002	Styles P, Cross and J-Hood	A Gangster and a Gentleman
"Planet of the Apes"	2003	Raekwon, Capone and Polite	The Lex Diamond Story
"Untouchable"	2003	DMX, Syleena Johnson, Cross, Infa-Red and Drag-On	Grand Champ
"J-A-D-A"	2003	Jadakiss	Honey (soundtrack)
"Metal Lungies"	2004	Ghostface Killah and Styles P	The Pretty Toney Album
"Silent Gun"	2004	Tiffany Villarreal	Tiffany Villarreal
"Real Hip Hop"	2004	Jadakiss	Kiss of Death
"In the Ghetto"	2006	DJ Kay Slay, Greg Street, Fat Joe, Jim Jones, Shaq Diesel and Cassidy	The Champions: North Meets South
"U Don't Like Me"	2006	OuterSpace	Blood Brothers
"Blue Armor"	2006	Ghostface Killah	More Fish
"Gangster, Gangster"	2007	Styles P and Jadakiss	Super Gangster (Extraordinary Gentleman)
"914"	2008	Pete Rock and Styles P	NY's Finest
"Drugs, Crime & Gorillaz"	2008	Termanology and Freeway	Politics as Usual
"Come & Get Me"	2009	Jadakiss and S.I.	The Last Kiss
"Keep Yo Hands Up"	2009	Freeway	Philadelphia Freeway 2
"Double Trouble"	2010	DJ Green Lantern and Styles P	The Green Ghost Project
"You Heard of Us"	2010	DJ Kay Slay, Styles P and Ray J	More Than Just a DJ
"Blockstars (Remix)"	2010	DJ Kay Slay, Busta Rhymes, Rick Ross, Papoose, Cam'ron, Vado and Ray J	More Than Just a DJ
"Youngstown Heist"	2010	Ghostface Killah, Trife da God and Bully	Wu-Massacre
"Street Bullies"	2010	Ghostface Killah, Shawn Wiggs and Sun God	Apollo Kids
"Street Shit"	2011	Styles P	Master of Ceremonies
"Uh-Ohh"	2011	Styles P	Master of Ceremonies
"Empire State High"	2012	Styles P	The World's Most Hardest MC Project
"Hater Love"	2013	Styles P	Float
"Straight Off the Block"	2013	Termanology, DJ Kay Slay and Lil Fame	G.O.Y.A. (Gunz Or Yay Available)
"Creep City"	2014	Styles P	Phantom and the Ghost
"Down Like This"	2014	Statik Selektah, Pharoahe Monch and Crooked I	What Goes Around
"Realest in the Game"	2015	Jadakiss and Young Buck	Top 5 Dead or Alive
"I Dream B.I.G."	2016	Termanology and Styles P	More Politics
"Nine Point Five"	2017	Talib Kweli, Styles P, Jadakiss and Niko Is	The Seven
"Take Me There"	2017	The Notorious B.I.G., Faith Evans and Styles P	The King & I
"Episode 12 – Lithium"	2018	Method Man and Hanz On	Meth Lab Season 2: The Lithium
"6 Minutes"	2024	Ghostface Killah, Jim Jones and Harl3y	Set the Tone (Guns & Roses)
"Dynomite"	2024	Redman	Muddy Waters Too

== See also ==
- The Lox discography
