= Ride-or-die chick =

Neologism of 'biker culture'

A ride-or-die chick is a neologism that originated during the 1950s, referring to a woman who is willing to support her significant other—particularly that partner's risky lifestyle—despite the ways that it may negatively affect her.

== Origin ==
The term ride or die began as 1950s biker (motorcyclist) slang, describing a mindset where a rider would rather die than be unable to ride. Over time, the expression drifted into mainstream culture, and its meaning evolved. Today, the term usually refers to a woman who embraces an intense "us-against-the-world" relationship with her significant other. She is seen as a loyal, "all-in" companion who sticks by her partner no matter what happens, even when doing so could put her at risk.

== Use in hip-hop music ==
The ride-or-die chick trope is used in hip-hop music, with men stating their desire for a ride-or-die chick, and women identifying themselves as willing to ride and die. Many of these songs are duets between male and female artists, containing both of these perspectives within the same song.

An early mainstream rap song to popularize the notion of a woman willing to "ride or die" is "The Bonnie and Clyde Theme" by Yo Yo, a duet featuring Ice Cube, on her third studio album, You Better Ask Somebody, released in June 1993.

The term's standing in mainstream hip-hop was established by other notable songs, namely the following:

- "Ride or Die" by Baby Gangsta feat. Lil Wayne and Juvenile on his third album, It's All on U, Vol. 2 in 1997
- "Ride or Die" by Jay-Z on Vol. 2. Hard Knock Life in 1998
- "Ryde or Die" by Ruff Ryders on Ryde or Die Vol. 1 in 1999
- "Ryde or Die, Bitch", a duet between The Lox and Eve on We Are the Streets in 2000

Other examples of the term in hip-hop include:

- "'03 Bonnie & Clyde" by Jay-Z ft. Beyoncé
- "Hail Mary", Tupac Shakur (as Makaveli)
- "Dog Match" by Eve feat. DMX
- "U Make Me Wanna" by Jadakiss feat. Mariah Carey
- "Down Ass Bitch" by Ja Rule feat.Charli Baltimore
- "You're All I Need" by Method Man feat. Mary J. Blige
- "I Killed Darnell Simmons" by Gun Rack, a.k.a. Jordan Peele
- "Boss Bitch" by Mac feat. Mia X
- "Ryda" by The Game feat. Dej Loaf
- "Bottom Bitch" by Rafael Casal
- "Rider" by Future (feat. Tasha Catour)
- "#HoodLove" by Jazmine Sullivan
- "R.O.D." by G-Dragon (feat. Lydia Paek)
- "Him & I" by G-Eazy and Halsey
- "Rider Chick" by Lil Durk feat. Dej Loaf
- "Ride or Die" by Nova (feat. Nia Kay)
- "She's Not Me (Ride or Die)" and "Blue Jeans" by Lana Del Rey
- "We Ride" by Gucci Mane (feat. Monica)
- "Ride or Die" by Fetty Wap (feat. Jhonni Blaze)
- "I Do" by Young Jeezy feat. Jay-Z and André 3000
- "R.O.D." by A Boogie wit da Hoodie
- "Ride For You" by Meek Mill (feat. Kehlani)
- "Ride Or Die" by Megan Thee Stallion and VickeeLo
- "I Need That" by the Peach Tree Rascals

== Everyday use of the term ==
=== Within celebrity culture ===
The term ride-or-die chick is sometimes used to describe the lives and decisions of women in the hip-hop community. In its interview with Tashera Simmons following the announcement of her divorce from rapper DMX, Essence magazine referred to her as "having a reputation for being the ultimate ride or die chick", citing Simmons' support of DMX despite his jail time, drug use, and infidelity. Rapper Lil' Kim was also called a "ride-or-die chick" after she was sent to jail for perjury, after lying to a jury about her manager's involvement in a shootout that included several rappers.

The term ride or die chick does not always imply drama and danger. For example, actress Gabrielle Union was described as a "ride-or-die chick" for her public and vehement defense of her husband, basketball player Dwyane Wade, after sharp criticism by basketball player/analyst Charles Barkley.

The term ride or die may even be used for any commitment, such as in the Philadelphia Tribune's statement that singer Beyoncé and rapper Jay-Z were "ride and die" after renewing their wedding vows. It is a term that has also been used to signal a quid pro quo, for example when, in 2025, Trump administration official Kimberly Guilfoyle asked Eric Deters for $100,000 to pay off her American Express bill, promising that she would be his "ride or die in the Trump world" if Deters wired the money to her account.

=== Outside of celebrity culture ===
The term is frequently and negatively used outside of celebrity culture. Blogs targeting young Black members of the "hip-hop generation" as their demographic—such as Hello Beautiful, Hall of the Black Dragon, and Urbanbellemag.com—have all published articles that advise women to be wary of attempting to be a ride-or-die chick at the expense of their own happiness and health. Such articles support the notion that women should have boundaries in their romantic relationships; these articles dismiss the idea of limitless loyalty as either an unrealistic myth or a dynamic that facilitates abuse and disrespect.

== Academic response ==
=== Defense of term ===
Black feminist scholar Treva Lindsey claims that the term ride-or-die chick challenges the dominant narrative in hip-hop, which privileges homosocial male relationships, as well as undermines heterosexual romantic bonds between men and women. Drawing on scholars such as Patricia Hill Collins and bell hooks, Lindsey argues that "in a culture that claims Black women are unlovable and undesirable, and Black men are violent and irredeemable, it is considered 'rebellious' when Black men and women love each other."

In addition, it has been argued that the ride or die narrative constitutes a recognition of the disenfranchisement that relevant couples face because of race and class, and that this systematic oppression causes them to feel that the situation is them against the world. According to this notion, by claiming to be a ride-or-die chick, a woman is not diminishing her own self-worth or inviting mistreatment, but symbolically invoking a politically aware alliance. Her recognition that committing to such a relationship would require her to ride or die is actually a statement about the difficulty that her partner would likely face as a Black man living an illicit lifestyle.

Another favorable understanding of the term depicts its meaning as flexible with the possibility of evolving positively. For example, a positive expression of the term might be to describe a devoted partnership between responsible and self-sufficient men and women, denoting mutual loyalty rather than the self-sacrifice of women for their male partners.

=== Critique of the term ===
Despite positive readings of the term and the fact that ride-or-die chicks are often the subject of male praise or female self-identification in hip-hop, the notion has been heavily criticized as a damaging ideal imposed on (Black) women. Critics have argued that ride-or-die chicks constitute a heterosexual male fantasy that privileges male pleasure and ignores the costs that women must bear to fulfill this fantasy. Hip-hop feminist author Gwendolyn D. Pough claims that the rising number of Black women in prison—currently the fastest-growing prison population in the USA—is evidence of the high cost that ride-or-die chicks must pay.

The ride-or-die chick can also be understood as a hip-hop reiteration of the Madonna–whore complex. The ride-or-die chick is the Madonna, and her opposite is the trick/ho (ho is slang for a promiscuous woman). While the ride-or-die chick is sexualized (unlike Madonna), sexuality is praised and valued. In accordance with the Madonna–whore paradigm, in this schema, women's sexuality is only for male pleasure and is limited to fulfilling one of two restrictive, opposing roles. Moreover, similarly to the Madonna–whore complex, in this understanding, the ride-or-die chick is a sexual script, although, unlike the Madonna–whore script, it is specific to Black women.

Another criticism of the ride-or-die chick concept refers to its place as one of several stereotypes (or scripts) that supposedly represent the entirety of Black female behavior rather than the specific meaning of this concept. Hip-hop activist Toni Blackman voiced her criticism of the term by stating that the sexuality of these scripts does not trouble her, but that "women's choices are only limited to A, B, and C. When a guy gets to choose between ABCDEFGHIJKLMNOP."

== See also ==
- Stereotypes of African Americans
- Mami (hip-hop)
- Video vixen
