= The Ghost Dub-Dime =

Mixtape by Styles P
- Released: 18 May 2010
- Recorded: 2009–2010
- Genre: Hip hop
- Length: 35:07
- Label: E1
- Producer: Tyler Woods, Street Radio, Ceasar Productions, Don Joe

Styles P chronology
The Green Ghost Project (2010)	The Ghost Dub-Dime (2010)	Master of Ceremonies (2011)

Singles from The Ghost Dub-Dime
- 1. "That Street Life" Released: 30 March 2010

Professional ratings
Review scores
Source	Rating
RapReviews.com	7/10 stars

The Ghost Dub-Dime is a retail and the 10th mixtape by rapper Styles P. It was released on 18 May 2010 via E1 Entertainment. Featured guest appearances are from Tre Williams, Jimi Kendrix & Tyler Woods. Production duties are handled by Tyler Woods, Street Radio, Caesar Productions and Don Joe for Dogozilla Productions.

== Track listing ==
No.	Title	Producer(s)	Length
1.	"Intro"	Tyler Woods	1:40
2.	"G-Sense"	Street Radio	3:04
3.	"Back on My New Shit" (featuring Tre Williams)	Street Radio	3:50
4.	"Where I'm From"	Street Radio	3:27
5.	"It's Over"	Ceasar Productions	3:00
6.	"The Beat Don't Stop" (featuring Jimi Kendrix)	Street Radio	2:48
7.	"That Street Life" (featuring Tyler Woods)	Tyler Woods	3:31
8.	"Fast Lane"	Don Joe	2:31
9.	"Here I Am"	Street Radio	2:41
10.	"Juice Bar"	Don Joe	3:10
11.	"Road to Success"	Ceasar Productions	3:21
12.	"Outro"	Street Radio	2:09
