= Money, Power & Respect (song) =

Single by The Lox featuring DMX and Lil' Kim

from the album Money, Power & Respect
- B-side: "Bitches From Eastwick"
- Released: March 17, 1998
- Recorded: 1997
- Genre: East Coast hip-hop; mafioso rap
- Length: 4:35
- Label: Bad Boy; Arista
- Songwriters: Jadakiss; Sheek Louch; Styles P; DMX
- Producer: The Hitmen

The Lox singles chronology
"If You Think I'm Jiggy" (1998)	"Money, Power & Respect" (1998)	"Ryde or Die, Bitch" (1999)

DMX singles chronology
"Stop Being Greedy" (1998)	"Money, Power & Respect" (1998)	"Ruff Ryders' Anthem" (1998)

Lil' Kim singles chronology
"It's All About the Benjamins" (1997)	"Money, Power & Respect" (1998)	"Get Naked" (1999)

"Money, Power & Respect" is the second single released from the Lox's debut album of the same name. The song was produced by Hitmen members D-Dot and Amen-Ra and featured DMX, who contributed the song's fourth verse. The song's chorus is performed by Lil' Kim; its motif is consistent with German sociologist Max Weber's Three-component theory of social stratification, which recognizes that one's wealth, power, and prestige, affects one's independent capability or ability to act on one's will. The track samples Dexter Wansel's 1979 song "New Beginning".

Released as the follow-up to their debut single, "If You Think I'm Jiggy", which peaked at No. 30 on the Billboard Hot 100, "Money, Power & Respect" was an even bigger success, reaching 17 on the Hot 100 and topping the Hot Rap Singles chart at No. 1. To date, the song remains the group's most successful single and was certified gold by the RIAA for sales of 500,000 copies on April 28, 1998.

In addition to the Money, Power & Respect album, the song was among the tracks on The Source Presents: Hip Hop Hits, Vol. 2, Music Inspired by Scarface, Survival of the Illest and Bad Boy's Greatest Hits. It was also used as entrance music for professional wrestler Jazz in Extreme Championship Wrestling.

== Single track listing ==
=== A-Side ===
1. "Money, Power & Respect" (Club Mix) 4:30
2. "Money, Power & Respect" (Instrumental) 5:12

=== B-Side ===
1. "Bitches From Eastwick" (Club Mix) 4:13
2. "If You Think I'm Jiggy" (Remix) 4:38

== Critical reception ==
Reflecting on the track's legacy, Pitchfork wrote that "Money, Power & Respect" excellently captured the "tension" of the late-1990s rap landscape, calling it the defining "sound of artists demanding their voice" as their "street realism" pushed against the "glossy machinery" of Bad Boy Records. Reviewing the song's legacy for Cleveland.com, Troy L. Smith highlighted DMX's closing verse, writing that his presence on the track was a "force of nature" that completely "devours" the Hitmen instrumental.

== Charts ==
=== Weekly charts ===
Chart (1998)	Peak position
U.S. Billboard Hot 100	17
U.S. Billboard Hot R&B/Hip-Hop Singles & Tracks	8
U.S. Billboard Hot Rap Singles	1
U.S. Billboard Hot Dance Music/Maxi-Singles Sales	3
U.S. Billboard Rhythmic Top 40	36

=== Year-end charts ===
Chart (1998)	Position
U.S. Billboard Hot 100	78

== Certifications ==
Region	Certification	Certified units/sales
United States (RIAA)	Platinum	1,000,000^{‡}
^{‡} Sales+streaming figures based on certification alone.
