= Tyler Woods =

American musician

- Born: November 29, 1982 (age 43); Pleasantville, New York, U.S.

Tyler Woods (born November 29, 1982) is an American singer-songwriter, composer, multi-instrumentalist and producer. Born in Pleasantville, New Jersey, and raised in Fayetteville, North Carolina, Woods was involved in music from an early age, participating in church choirs, studying piano and forming his own group, Devoted. After graduating from high school, Woods immediately began touring Europe with N-Trigue. His first album, The R&B Sensation, produced by the Grammy Award-winning producer 9th Wonder, was released in 2009. Woods has also been featured with many artists including Styles P, Talib Kweli, Buckshot, Chink Santana, Lloyd, Marc Dorsey, Living Color, Bink and The Lox.

== Early life ==
Woods was born on November 29, 1982, to Geraldine Woods and the late William E. Woods Sr., the second of three children. His family moved to North Carolina a year after his birth. Raised in Fayetteville, Woods was heavily influenced by his parents, both musicians in their own right. Woods was active in his church choir from age five and watched his mother play the piano every Sunday. By the age of ten, he was attending rehearsals with his father, a college music teacher, playing drums and the trombone with high school students. By the time Woods entered high school he had formed his own group, Devoted, performing in local talent competitions and public events.

In 2008, Tyler Woods married actress Radost Bokel with whom he has a son. The marriage ended in divorce in 2015; Bokel now lives in Germany

== Career ==
Shortly after graduating in 1999, Tyler left North Carolina for a European tour with the R&B quartet N-Trigue.

After international success, Woods returned to America in 2002. He briefly enrolled at Living Arts College in Raleigh-Durham, studying audio engineering, music theory and graphic design before dropping out to continue his musical career. Independently, Woods worked extensively with the producers Rich Harrison, Chink Santana and Ski. 102 Jamz, the local radio station in Greensboro, North Carolina, picked up his single "Maybelline Lady", which attracted the attention of the Grammy Award-winning producer 9th Wonder, who signed Tyler to his Jamla Records label in 2008.

In 2009, Woods released his first album, The R&B Sensation, produced by 9th Wonder and released on his Jamla Records label.

A follow-up EP, The Mahogany Experiment, was released on February 14, 2011, produced by 9th Wonder and E. Jones and featuring the Jamla artists Big Remo and Heather Victoria as well as Talib Kweli and Styles P.

Woods has released two R&B Christmas records. Christmas In The Woods was self-released in 2009 and D-Block Records Presents: A Tyler Woods Christmas came out in 2013.

In December 2013, Woods spent time in the studio with The Lox as they worked on The Trinity EP. Woods was featured on "Faded", the first single from the record. Woods appeared with The Lox on DJ Kay Slay's morning radio show on January 15, 2014.

Since first touring internationally with N-Trigue, he has also worked and toured with artists such as Us 5, Ayman, The Weather Girls, Crystal Waters, Greg De Nuville, D Double E, Triple M and ZYX Records.

Woods has also been featured with many artists including Styles P, Talib Kweli, Buckshot, Chink Santana, Lloyd, Mark Dorsey, Living Colour, Akhenaton, Bink and The Lox, and has produced with Pete Rock, Andre Betts, Kid Capri and Statik Selektah.

== Honors ==
The singles "Prove Myself" and "Slow Jams" reached number one on BET J (now BET Her). Woods received an Southeastern Music Entertainment Summit Music Award for the number one song "Prove Myself" in 2009.

== Discography ==
=== Albums ===
- 9th Wonder Presents: The R&B Sensation (2009)
- Christmas In The Woods (2009)
- 9th Wonder Presents: The Mahogany Experiment (2011)
- D-Block Presents: A Tyler Woods Christmas (2013)

=== Singles ===
- "It Ain’t Over" – Jozeemo, The Dream Merchant Vol. 2 (2007)
- "Love And Appreciate II" – Murs, Murs For President (2008)
- "Ghetto Love" – Various Artists, Fight 4 New York: We Coming 4 That Radio Play (2009)
- "That Street Life" (feat. Tyler Woods) – Styles P, That Street Life Single (2010)
- "Who Gets Your Love (feat. HOS)" – 9th Wonder, 9th’s Opus: It’s A Wonderful World Music Group, Vol. 1 (2010)
- "Monumental" - Pete Rock and Smif-N-Wessun, Monumental (2011)
- "Hold It Down" – Buckshot, The Formula (2012)
- "Gangster Lean" – Fred the Godson, Contraband Mixtape (2013)
- "Faded" (feat. Tyler Woods) – The Lox, The Trinity EP (2013)
