= If You Think I'm Jiggy =

Single by The Lox

from the album Money, Power & Respect
- Released: January 6, 1998
- Recorded: 1997
- Genre: Hip hop
- Length: 4:40
- Label: Bad Boy; Arista
- Songwriter(s): Jadakiss; Sheek Louch; Styles P
- Producer(s): Dame Grease

The Lox singles chronology
"It's All About the Benjamins" (1997)	"If You Think I'm Jiggy" (1998)	"Money, Power & Respect" (1998)

"If You Think I'm Jiggy" is the first single released by rap group The Lox from their debut album, Money, Power & Respect. It was released on January 6, 1998, and produced by Dame Grease. The single peaked at No. 30 on the Billboard Hot 100, No. 21 on the Hot R&B/Hip-Hop Singles & Tracks chart, and No. 9 on the Hot Rap Singles chart. The song interpolates Rod Stewart's "Da Ya Think I'm Sexy?".

== Single track listing ==
=== A-side ===
1. "If You Think I'm Jiggy" (Club Mix)- 3:47
2. "If You Think I'm Jiggy" (Instrumental)- 3:46

=== B-side ===
1. "If You Think I'm Jiggy" (Radio Edit)- 3:23
2. "If You Think I'm Jiggy" (Instrumental)- 3:46

== Charts ==
=== Weekly charts ===
Chart (1998)	Peak position
US Billboard Hot 100	30
US Billboard Hot R&B/Hip-Hop Singles & Tracks	21
US Billboard Hot Rap Singles	9

=== Year-end charts ===
Chart (1998)	Position
US Billboard Hot R&B/Hip-Hop Singles & Tracks	100
US Billboard Hot Rap Singles	36
