= G-Host =

Studio album by Styles P
- Released: May 4, 2018
- Recorded: 2017–2018
- Genre: Hip hop
- Length: 48:53
- Label: Phantom; D-Block
- Producer: Black Saun; Boger; Dayzel The Machine; Divine Bars; Fortes; Grade A; Jimmy Dukes; Phonix Beats; Poobs; Prophe.T.; Rondon; Scram Jones; Vinny Idol

Styles P chronology
Vibes (2017)	G-Host (2018)	Beloved (2018)

Singles from G-Host
- 1. "Heat of the Night" Released: April 19, 2018

Professional ratings
Review scores
Source	Rating
HipHopDX	3.8/5

G-Host is the ninth solo studio album by American rapper Styles P. It was released on May 4, 2018, via Phantom Entertainment and D-Block Records. Production was handled by Poobs, Jimmy Dukes, Phonix Beats, Black Saun, Boger, Dayzel The Machine, Divine Bars, Fortes, Grade A, Prophe.T., Rondon, Scram Jones and Vinny Idol. It features guest appearances from Dyce Payne, Nino Man, Boog Jones, Cris Streetz, Jacob Berger, Kay Rosewood, Khardier Da God, Kobe, L-Biz, Oswin Benjamin, Tifani and Whispers.

The album debuted at number 166 on the Billboard 200 and number 17 on the Independent Albums in the United States.

== Background ==
On April 19, 2018, Styles P premiered a single "Heat of the Night" along with the announcement of the release of G-Host. The album's title is a reference to Styles P's nickname, Ghost. On May 1, 2018, the rapper shared the tracklist and on May 3, 2018, he revealed Christian King made cover art. Benji Filmz directed an accompanying music video for "Heat of the Night", which was released on May 15, 2018.

== Track listing ==
No.	Title	Producer(s)	Length
1.	"Bubble Up" (featuring Dyce Payne)	Boger	3:06
2.	"Welfare" (featuring Whispers)	Jimmy Dukes	3:19
3.	"Coolest O.G." (featuring Dyce Payne)	Phonix Beats	3:23
4.	"Ghost Wars"	Rondon; Poobs	3:10
5.	"(Skit) Ronald Grump" (featuring Jacob Berger, Khardier Da God and Cris Streetz)	Poobs	1:00
6.	"Wait Your Turn B"	Black Saun	3:22
7.	"Heat of the Night" (featuring Kobe Honeycutt)	Phonix Beats	3:03
8.	"(Skit) Ill" (featuring Kay Rosewood)	Poobs	0:22
9.	"Morning Mourning" (featuring Oswin Benjamin)	Divine Bars	3:36
10.	"Different Shit"	Dayzel the Machine	2:50
11.	"For This Occasion"	Grade A	3:13
12.	"Window to the Soul"	Vinny Idol	3:30
13.	"(Skit) Going Live" (featuring Nino Man and Dyce Payne)	Poobs	0:46
14.	"Curb the Lames" (featuring Boog Jones)	Prophe.T.	3:36
15.	"(Skit) Live Still Lit" (featuring Nino Man and Dyce Payne)	Poobs	0:49
16.	"Going Thru Hell"	Scram Jones	4:19
17.	"I Got Issues"	Fortes	2:22
18.	"Sky High" (featuring L.Biz and Tifani)	Jimmy Dukes	3:07
Total length:			48:53

== Charts ==
Chart (2018)	Peak position
US Billboard 200	166
US Independent Albums (Billboard)	17
