= The Trinity 2nd Sermon =

EP by The Lox
- Released: November 5, 2014
- Recorded: 2014
- Genre: Hip hop
- Length: 19:22
- Label: D-Block Records

The Lox chronology
The Trinity (2013)	The Trinity 2nd Sermon (2014)	Filthy America... It's Beautiful (2016)

The Trinity 2nd Sermon is the second EP by American hip hop group The Lox. The EP was released on November 5, 2014, by D-Block Records.

== Track listing ==
No.	Title	Producer(s)	Length
1.	"Let's Get It"	Vinny Idol, Grandz Muzik	3:59
2.	"Horror" (featuring Tyler Woods)	Black Saun, Tyler Woods	3:38
3.	"All We Know"	Buda Da Future, Grandz Muzik	3:32
4.	"Footage" (featuring Whispers)	Whispers, Khardier Da God, Contraband	4:31
5.	"Survivor"	Dayzel	3:42

== Charts ==
Chart (2014)	Peak position
US Top R&B/Hip-Hop Albums (Billboard)	20
