= Tre Williams =

American singer from Florida

- Origin: Daytona Beach, Florida; Yonkers, New York
- Genres: Hip hop, R&B
- Occupation: Singer
- Labels: Ill Will Records, Decision Records

Tre Williams is an American singer, formerly affiliated with Nas' label, Ill Will Records.

Father of Trill Williams aka WWE wrestler Trill London

== Biography ==
Williams was born October 1971 and raised in the projects of Daytona Beach, Florida. He enrolled in Bethune-Cookman College, but dropped out at age 21 and moved to Yonkers, New York to further his career. After an appearance on "Amateur Night at the Apollo" in 2001, he was invited to sing on the title track of Petey Pablo's album, Diary of a Sinner: 1st Entry. In 2005, Williams appeared on the track "I-95" on rap group The L.O.X.'s mixtape Peer Pressure, earning him notice in hip-hop magazine The Source. Williams also put the track on his mixtape, The Street Gospel. Then, in 2006, Williams was featured on "Let There Be Light" on Ill Will Records founder Nas' album, Hip Hop Is Dead, which received play on BET music video show 106 & Park.

Williams had been working on a debut album, The Depth of My Soul, that was expected to be released in 2007, with guest appearances from Nas, Styles P, Kanye West and others. However, the album ended up being shelved indefinitely. Following his stint with Ill Will, Williams began working with Brooklyn, NY based producer Bob Perry. Together they formed a band called The Revelations feat. Tre Williams. Their original lineup included fellow R&B singer-songwriter Rell. The band's music was inspired by vintage soul records from the late 1960s and early 1970s. They released Deep Soul EP in 2008, followed by their full-length debut, entitled The Bleeding Edge, on October 6, 2009. A second full-length album Concrete Blues was released in November 2011 on Decision Records/NIA Music. Tre Williams is also the Author of a book entitled “Unlawfully Yours”.

== Discography ==
=== With The Revelations featuring Tre Williams ===
- 2008: Deep Soul EP
- October 2009: The Bleeding Edge
- November 2011: Concrete Blues

=== Mixtapes ===
- Nas & Ill Will Records Present Tre Williams: The Street Gospel

=== Appearances ===
- 2001: "Diary of a Sinner" (from the Petey Pablo album Diary of a Sinner: 1st Entry)
- 2005: "I-95" (from The L.O.X. mixtape Peer Pressure)
- 2006: "Let There Be Light" (from the Nas album Hip Hop Is Dead)
- 2007: "What a Life" (from the Saigon mixtape The Moral of the Story)
- 2009: "I Wish You Were Here" (from the Wu-Tang Clan album Chamber Music)
- 2012: "I Forgot To Be Your Lover" (from The Man with the Iron Fists soundtrack)
- 2014: "The Battlefield" and "It's a Thin Line Between Love and Hate" (from the Ghostface Killah album 36 Seasons)
