= The Green Ghost Project =

Studio album by Styles P & DJ Green Lantern
- Released: February 2, 2010
- Recorded: 2010
- Genre: Hip hop
- Length: 52:45
- Label: Invasion; D-Block
- Producer: Alchemist; Buckwild; Dame Grease; DJ Green Lantern; Dutchez Beatz; Poobs; Scram Jones; Statik Selektah; Vinny Idol

Styles P chronology
Super Gangster (Extraordinary Gentleman) (2007)	The Green Ghost Project (2010)	Master of Ceremonies (2011)

Singles from The Green Ghost Project
- 1. "Send a Kite" Released: January 25, 2010

Professional ratings
Review scores
Source	Rating
AllMusic	3.5/5 stars
HipHopDX	3.5/5
RapReviews	7/10
XXL	4/5 (XL)

The Green Ghost Project is a collaborative studio album by American rapper Styles P and record producer DJ Green Lantern. It was released on February 2, 2010, via Invasion Music Group and D-Block Records. Beside Green Lantern, production was handled by Alchemist, Buckwild, Dame Grease, Dutchez Beatz, Poobs, Scram Jones, Statik Selektah and Vinny Idol. It features guest appearances from Tre Williams, Dwayne Collins, June Summers, Junior Reid, M.O.P., Noreaga, Raekwon, S.I. and Uncle Murda, as well as Styles P's The Lox groupmates Jadakiss and Sheek Louch.

The album peaked at number 44 on the Top R&B/Hip-Hop Albums, number 16 on the Top Rap Albums and number 34 on the Independent Albums charts in the United States.

== Track listing ==
No.	Title	Producer(s)	Length
1.	"Nothing to Lose"	DJ Green Lantern	3:03
2.	"Double Trouble" (featuring Sheek Louch)	DJ Green Lantern	3:28
3.	"Callin' Me" (featuring Tre Williams)	Scram Jones	3:58
4.	"Send a Kite" (featuring Dwayne Collins)	DJ Green Lantern	4:06
5.	"Make Millions from Entertainment"	The Alchemist	3:27
6.	"Invasion" (featuring Jadakiss and Junior Reid)	DJ Green Lantern	3:11
7.	"Time Will Tell" (featuring Raekwon)	Buckwild	2:31
8.	"Pablo Doe" (featuring Noreaga and Uncle Murda)	DJ Green Lantern	3:46
9.	"Real Ghostly"	Dutchez Beatz	3:24
10.	"Pretty Little Thing" (featuring June Summers)	DJ Green Lantern	3:20
11.	"Shadows"	Statik Selektah	3:55
12.	"Legal Money"	Vinny Idol	3:37
13.	"That's Me" (featuring S.I.)	Dame Grease	3:10
14.	"Bang Time" (featuring M.O.P.)	DJ Green Lantern	4:13
15.	"Born in These Streets" (featuring Tre Williams)	Poobs	3:36
Total length:			52:45

== Personnel ==
- David "Styles P" Styles – vocals
- Sean "Sheek Louch" Jacobs – vocals (track 2)
- Tre Williams – vocals (tracks: 3, 15)
- Dwayne Collins – vocals (track 4)
- Jason "Jadakiss" Phillips – vocals (track 6)
- Delroy "Junior" Reid – vocals (track 6)
- Corey "Raekwon" Woods – vocals (track 7)
- Victor "N.O.R.E." Santiago – vocals (track 8)
- Leonard "Uncle Murda" Grant – vocals (track 8)
- June Summers – vocals (track 10)
- S.I. – vocals (track 13)
- Eric "Billy Danze" Murray – vocals (track 14)
- Jamal "Lil' Fame" Grinnage – vocals (track 14)
- James "DJ Green Lantern" D'Agostino – producer (tracks: 1, 2, 4, 6, 8, 10, 14)
- Marc "Scram Jones" Shemer – producer & mixing (track 3)
- Alan "The Alchemist" Maman – producer & mixing (track 5)
- Anthony "Buckwild" Best – producer (track 7)
- Dutchez Beatz – producer (track 9)
- Patrick "Statik Selektah" Baril – producer & mixing (track 11)
- Randy "Vinny Idol" Ousley – producer (track 12)
- Damon "Dame Grease" Blackman – producer (track 13)
- Jesus "Poobs" Fernandez – producer (track 15)
- Ruben "Swift" Vidal – mixing (tracks: 1, 2, 4, 6, 9, 12, 15)
- Rage One Music – mixing (track 7)
- Dan "The Man" Humiston – mixing (tracks: 8, 10, 13, 14)
- Eric Gorman – mastering

== Charts ==
Chart (2010)	Peak position
US Top R&B/Hip-Hop Albums (Billboard)	44
US Top Rap Albums (Billboard)	16
US Independent Albums (Billboard)	34
