= Living Off Xperience =

Studio album by the Lox
- Released: August 28, 2020
- Genre: Hip hop
- Length: 56:54
- Label: D-Block; Roc Nation
- Producer: AraabMuzik; Avedon; Dayzel "The Machine" Fowler; Duane "DaRock" Ramos; Eugen Boger; Jimmy Dukes; Joey Rabadi; Julio Mejia; Large Professor; Nottz; Papamitrou; The Rascals; Scott Storch; Scram Jones; Smiley's People; Statik Selektah; Swizz Beatz; Taka; Vinny Idol

The Lox chronology
Filthy America... It's Beautiful (2016)	Living Off Xperience (2020)

Singles from Living Off Xperience
- 1. "Loyalty & Love" Released: April 3, 2020; 2. "Gave It to ‘Em" Released: May 29, 2020

Living Off Xperience is the fourth studio album by American hip hop group The Lox. It was released on August 28, 2020, through D-Block and Roc Nation. The album features guest appearances from Benny the Butcher, Clay Dub, DMX, Dyce Payne, Jeremih, Oswin Benjamin, T-Pain and Westside Gunn.

== Critical reception ==
Professional ratings
Review scores
Source	Rating
Allmusic	3.5/5 stars
RapReviews	7/10

The album received mostly positive reviews from critics. Grant Jones from RapReviews wrote: "Living Off Xperience might well be the best LOX project, but it still suffers from LOX-isms that aren’t necessarily exclusive to Jada, Styles and Sheek. You can almost picture the checklist that rap albums used to rely upon: a song for the ladies, a song for the club, a song for the street, a posse cut etc. That’s not to say that The LOX lack invention because this album is still enjoyable, but it’s a safe record that has its moments, but ultimately never reaches greatness. Can they? With some focus, for sure. A strictly grimy, Sid Roams style record that’s pure nastiness would give the Griselda boys a run for their money. A mature, R&B-driven set of songs embracing what The LOX do and how they feel today would be a breath of fresh air. But Living Off Xperience is caught between the two and ultimately excels in neither."

== Track listing ==
No.	Title	Producer(s)	Length
1.	"Gave It to ‘Em"	Swizz Beatz; AraabMuzik	3:57
2.	"Move"	Avedon; Scott Storch	3:50
3.	"Bout Shit" (featuring DMX)	Scram Jones	4:21
4.	"Testify"	Vinny Idol	4:25
5.	"Miss You" (featuring T-Pain)	Papamitrou	3:56
6.	"Story"	Nottz	4:27
7.	"Do to Me" (featuring Jeremih)	The Rascals; Scott Storch	3:36
8.	"Come Back"	Statik Selektah	3:56
9.	"Think of the LOX" (featuring Westside Gunn and Benny the Butcher)	Large Professor	4:50
10.	"My America" (featuring Oswin Benjamin)	Dayzel "The Machine" Fowler; Joey Rabadi	6:13
11.	"Net Worth"	Julio Mejia	2:04
12.	"Dirty Dirty" (featuring Clay Dub)	Duane "DaRock" Ramos; Taka	3:19
13.	"Commitment" (featuring Dyce Payne)	Eugen Boger	3:56
14.	"Loyalty & Love"	Smiley's People; Jimmy Dukes	4:04
Total length:			56:54

== Charts ==
Chart performance for Living Off Xperience
Chart (2020)	Peak position
US Billboard 200	154
