= The World's Most Hardest MC Project =

Studio album by Styles P
- Released: November 20, 2012
- Recorded: 2012
- Genre: Hip hop
- Length: 29:28
- Label: Phantom; D-Block; Asti; eOne
- Producer: AraabMuzik, Black Saun, Buda Da Future, GrandzMuzik, Jahlil Beats, Poobs, Raphael RJ2, Supastylez, Vinny Idol

Styles P chronology
Master of Ceremonies (2011)	The World's Most Hardest MC Project (2012)	Float (2013)

Singles from The World's Most Hardest MC Project
- 1. "I Know" Released: October 11, 2012; 2. "Araab Styles" Released: October 22, 2012

The World's Most Hardest MC Project, is the fifth studio album by D-Block member and New York rapper Styles P. It was released on November 20, 2012, by Phantom Entertainment, D-Block Records, Asti, and eOne Music. The album was supported by two singles, "I Know" and "Araab Styles". Producers on the album included Jahlil Beats and AraabMuzik, among others, with features including Sheek Louch, Bucky, Large Amount, A.P. and Snyp.

== Background ==
On August 23, 2012, Styles P released the free EP The Diamond Life Project, a collaboration with streetwear/skateboarding label Diamond Supply Co. The mixtape featured guest appearances from French Montana, Pusha T, Curren$y, Trae Tha Truth and Fred the Godson; as well as production from Jahlil Beats, The Beat Bully, Lex Luger, V Don and The Alchemist.

After the release of the EP, Styles continued work on The World's Most Hardest MC Project.

The album features production from AraabMuzik and Jahlil Beats among other street producers with the only features coming from the D-Block family. The original release date was November 13, 2012, but it was pushed back to November 19.

== Singles ==
The first single entitled "I Know" was released on October 11, 2012. It is produced by Jahlil Beats. On October 22, 2012, the music video was released for "Araab Styles". "Araab Styles" was also released as the second single. On November 11, 2012, the music video was released for "I Know". On November 20, 2012, the music video was released for "Pop Out". On November 23, 2012, the music video was released for "Hoody Season".

== Critical reception ==
Professional ratings
Review scores
Source	Rating
AllMusic	3.5/5 stars
HipHopDX	3.5/5 stars
XXL	(L)

The World's Most Hardest MC Project was met with generally positive reviews from music critics. Nick De Molina of XXL gave the album an L rating, stating that the album is "a brief, hard-bodied offering from, as the title suggests, an MC who has made it his business to stay gutter in the ever-softening climate of mainstream hip-hop." The production was praised and he was called one of the most consistent artists in the game. However the album was described as sounding vaguely playful. David "Rek" Lee of HipHopDX gave the album three and a half stars out of five, saying "Overall, you won't find a highly conceptual track on here but there is enough solid material on here to make a strong case for The World's Most Hardest MC, both in the street and on the mic." David Jeffries of AllMusic gave the album three and a half stars out of five, saying "It all works, and there's a winning mix of hardcore and crossover that deserves consideration, but it all runs out too fast, coming off as a taster platter for a better, fatter, four-star Styles P album."

== Track listing ==
No.	Title	Producer(s)	Length
1.	"Intro"		0:47
2.	"Araab Styles"	AraabMuzik	3:00
3.	"I Know"	Jahlil Beats	3:19
4.	"Like That"	Buda Da Future, GrandzMuzik	3:18
5.	"Empire State High" (featuring Sheek Louch)	Supastylez	2:48
6.	"Pop Out"	Vinny Idol	2:15
7.	"Hoody Season"	Black Saun	2:31
8.	"Monopolizing" (featuring Bucky & Large Amount)	Vinny Idol	3:26
9.	"Shooter" (featuring Snyp & A.P.)	Supastylez	3:45
10.	"Murda Mommy"	Raphael RJ2	3:37
11.	"Outro"		0:42

== Personnel ==
Credits adapted from AllMusic.

- A.P.P. – Featured Artist
- Black Saun – Producer
- Supastylez – Producer
- Bucky – Featured Artist
- Buda Da Future – Producer
- Kristi Clifford – Management
- Grandz Muzik – Producer
- Vinny Idol – Producer
- Jahlil Beat – Producer
- Andrew Kelley – Art Direction, design
- Large Amount – Featured Artist
- Sheek Louch – Featured Artist
- Araab Muzik – Producer
- Poobs – Producer
- Raafi Rivero – Photography
- Raphael Rj2 – Producer
- Snype – Featured Artist
- Styles P – Primary Artist

== Charts ==
Chart (2012)	Peak position
US Top R&B/Hip-Hop Albums (Billboard)	35
US Independent Albums (Billboard)	29
