= The Trinity (EP) =

EP by the Lox
- Released: December 18, 2013
- Recorded: 2013
- Genre: Hip hop
- Length: 14:48
- Label: D-Block
- Producer: Eric G., Vinny Idol, Buda da Future, Grandz Muzik, Dayzel

The Lox chronology
We Are the Streets (2000)	The Trinity (2013)	The Trinity 2nd Sermon (2014)

The Trinity is the debut EP by American hip hop group the Lox. The EP was released on December 18, 2013, by D-Block Records. It served as their first release in over 13 years. The EP features guest appearances from Tyler Woods and Dyce Payne.

== Critical reception ==
Professional ratings
Review scores
Source	Rating
HipHopDX	3/5 stars

Upon its release, The Trinity received generally positive reviews from music critics. Homer Johnsen of HipHopDX gave the album three out of five stars, saying "The EP as a whole also lacks the inter-verse group dynamic. For instance, the classic Noreaga track “Banned From TV” features Jadakiss and Styles P finishing each other's lines with intersecting verses. Displays of chemistry like that are nowhere to be found on The Trinity. Instead, it's just basic verse-for-verse rhyming. The LOX have proven that they can make good music in any decade, but on this EP their attempts to mold their sound into a more contemporary one, while still staying true to themselves, are noticeable. As stated before, LOX fans should be satisfied with The Trinity. It serves as a useful warm-up course for We Are The Streets 2, and is solid at best, considering it's their first release in 13 years."

== Commercial performance ==
The album debuted at number 141 on the Billboard 200 chart, with first-week sales of 8,400 copies in the United States.

== Track listing ==
No.	Title	Producer(s)	Length
1.	"Faded" (featuring Tyler Woods)	Eric G.	3:53
2.	"Talk About It"	Vinny Idol	3:57
3.	"Love Me or Leave Me Alone"	Buda Da Future, Grandz Muzik	3:04
4.	"Three Kings" (featuring Dyce Payne)	Dayzel	3:54

== Charts ==
Chart (2013)	Peak position
US Billboard 200	141
US Top R&B/Hip-Hop Albums (Billboard)	17
