= Filthy America... It's Beautiful =

Studio album by the Lox
- Released: December 16, 2016
- Genre: Hip hop
- Length: 41:20
- Labels: D-Block; Roc Nation
- Producers: Buda and Grandz; Dame Grease; Dayzel the Machine; DJ Premier; ITrez; Jimmy Dukes; Pav Bundy; Pete Rock; Smiley's People; V Don

The Lox chronology
| The Trinity 2nd Sermon (2014) | Filthy America... It's Beautiful (2016) | Living Off Xperience (2020) |

Professional ratings
Review scores
| Source | Rating |
|---|---|
| AllMusic | 4/5 stars |

Filthy America... It's Beautiful is the third studio album by American hip hop group the Lox. It is their first studio album in 16 years. The album was released on December 16, 2016, by D-Block Records and Roc Nation.

== Track listing ==
| No. | Title | Writer(s) | Producer(s) | Length |
|---|---|---|---|---|
| 1. | "Omen" | Sean Jacobs; David Styles; Jason Phillips; Francis Ubiera Jr.; Daniel Garcia | Buda and Grandz | 2:39 |
| 2. | "Stupid Questions" (skit) | | | 2:12 |
| 3. | "What Else You Need to Know" | S. Jacobs; D. Styles; J. Phillips; James Fowler | Dayzel the Machine | 3:17 |
| 4. | "The Family" | S. Jacobs; D. Styles; J. Phillips; Tivon Key; Jonathan Sharp | V Don | 3:46 |
| 5. | "The Agreement" (featuring Fetty Wap and Dyce Payne) | S. Jacobs; D. Styles; J. Phillips; Jim Tyree Salter III; Eric Marrell Smith; Willie Maxwell II; Steven Sherrill | Jimmy Dukes; Smiley's People | 3:58 |
| 6. | "Move Forward" | S. Jacobs; D. Styles; J. Phillips; Christopher Martin | DJ Premier | 3:49 |
| 7. | "Savior" (featuring Dyce Payne) | S. Jacobs; D. Styles; J. Phillips; J. Fowler; S. Sherrill; Isaac Hayes; Alvertis Isbell | Dayzel the Machine | 3:23 |
| 8. | "Don't You Cry" | S. Jacobs; D. Styles; J. Phillips; Paris Wells | Pav Bundy | 3:59 |
| 9. | "Hard Life" (featuring Mobb Deep) | S. Jacobs; D. Styles; J. Phillips; Damon Blackman; Kejuan Muchita; Albert Johnson | Dame Grease | 5:01 |
| 10. | "Filthy America" | S. Jacobs; D. Styles; J. Phillips; Peter Phillips | Pete Rock | 4:30 |
| 11. | "Bag Allegiance" (skit) | | | 0:20 |
| 12. | "Secure the Bag" (featuring Gucci Mane and InfaRed) | S. Jacobs; D. Styles; J. Phillips; Shandel Green; Radric Davis; Montre Delandon Edmonds II | ITrez Beatz | 4:39 |

Notes

- "Secure the Bag" features additional vocals by DJ Khaled.

Sample credits

- "The Family" contains elements from "Ambient Dreams", written by Jonathan Sharp, and performed by Summer Witch Music.
- "Savior" contains elements from "Hyperbolicsyllabicsesquedalymistic", written by Isaac Hayes and Alvertis Isbell, and performed by Isaac Hayes.

== Personnel ==
- Dan – mixing (10)
- Tony Dawsey – mastering
- Dayzel the Machine – engineer
- Rich Keller – mixing (3, 7, 9, 12)
- DJ Premier – mixing (6)
- Matthew "Matty Rich" Testa – mixing (1, 4, 5, 8)

== Charts ==
| Chart (2016) | Peak position |
|---|---|
| US Billboard 200 | 42 |
| US Top R&B/Hip-Hop Albums (Billboard) | 6 |
