= Money, Power & Respect =

Studio album by the Lox
- Released: January 13, 1998
- Genre: Hip-hop
- Length: 67:21
- Labels: Arista; Bad Boy; Ruff Ryders
- Producers: Deric "D-Dot" Angelettie; Ron "Amen-Ra" Lawrence

The Lox chronology
| Money, Power & Respect (1998) | We Are the Streets (2000) |

Singles from Money, Power & Respect
- 1. "We'll Always Love Big Poppa" Released: May 27, 1997; 2. "If You Think I'm Jiggy" Released: January 6, 1998; 3. "Money, Power & Respect" Released: March 17, 1998

Professional ratings
Review scores
| Source | Rating |
|---|---|
| AllMusic | 3/5 stars |
| Entertainment Weekly | A− |
| RapReviews | 7/10 |
| The Source | 3.5/5 stars |
| Spin | 4/10 |

Money, Power & Respect is the debut album by hip hop group The LOX. It was released on January 13, 1998, through Arista Records and Sean "Puffy" Combs's Bad Boy Records. The album featured production from the Hitmen, Dame Grease and Swizz Beatz. The album found huge success, peaking at number three on the US Billboard 200 and number one on the Top R&B/Hip-Hop Albums, and spawned two charting singles, "Money, Power & Respect" and "If You Think I'm Jiggy". In 2008, the title track was ranked number 53 on Vh1's 100 Greatest Songs of Hip Hop.

== Commercial performance ==
Money, Power & Respect debuted and peaked at number 3 on the Billboard 200, selling over 110,000 copies in the first week. The album has since been certified Platinum by the Recording Industry Association of America (RIAA) for shipping and selling over 1,000,000 copies in America. To date, it is the Lox' best selling album.

== Track listing ==
Credits adapted from the album's liner notes.

| No. | Title | Writer(s) | Producer(s) | Length |
|---|---|---|---|---|
| 1. | "Yonkers Tale" (Intro) | | Deric "D-Dot" Angelettie; the Lox | 1:45 |
| 2. | "Livin' the Life" | Sean Jacobs; Jason Phillips; David Styles; Sean Combs; Richard Frierson | Sean "Puffy" Combs; Richard "Younglord" Frierson | 3:36 |
| 3. | "If You Think I'm Jiggy" | Jacobs; Phillips; Styles; Damon Blackman; Rod Stewart; Carmine Appice | Dame Grease | 4:40 |
| 4. | "The Interview, Pt. 1" (Interlude) | | Deric "D-Dot" Angelettie; the Lox; Richard "Younglord" Frierson (co.) | 0:39 |
| 5. | "Money, Power & Respect" (featuring DMX and Lil' Kim) | Jacobs; Phillips; Styles; Earl Simmons; Deric Angelettie; Ron Lawrence; Herb Smith | Deric "D-Dot" Angelettie; Ron "Amen-Ra" Lawrence; Jay Garfield (co.) | 4:35 |
| 6. | "Get This $" (featuring Puff Daddy) | Jacobs; Phillips; Styles; Combs; O'Kelly Isley Jr.; Ronald Isley; Rudolph Isley | Sean "Puffy" Combs; Jeffery "J-Dub" Walker; * DJ Iroc (scratches) | 3:58 |
| 7. | "Let's Start Rap Over" (featuring Carl Thomas) | Jacobs; Phillips; Styles; Blackman; Jeffery Walker; E. Gaynor; K. Spalding; Micheal Claxton | Dame Grease; Jeffery "J-Dub" Walker (co.) | 4:28 |
| 8. | "Mad Rapper" (Interlude) | | Deric "D-Dot" Angelettie; the Lox; Richard "Younglord" Frierson (co.) | 1:15 |
| 9. | "I Wanna Thank You" (featuring Kelly Price) | Jacobs; Phillips; Styles; Nashiem Myrick; Jimmy Radcliffe; B.J. Scott | Nashiem Myrick | 4:02 |
| 10. | "Goin' Be Some Shit" (Sheek Louch solo) | Jacobs; Myrick; Carlos Broady; MC Lyte; Emcee Dee | Nashiem Myrick; Carlos "Six July" Broady; * DJ Iroc (scratches) | 4:20 |
| 11. | "The Heist, Pt. 1" | Jacobs; Phillips; Styles; Combs; Rob Carter | Sean "Puffy" Combs; Rob "Arsee" Carter | 2:51 |
| 12. | "Not to Be Fucked With" (Styles P solo) | Styles; Blackman | Dame Grease; Sean "Puffy" Combs | 4:23 |
| 13. | "The Set-Up" (Interlude) | | Deric "D-Dot" Angelettie; the Lox; Richard "Younglord" Frierson (co.) | 0:48 |
| 14. | "Bitches from Eastwick" | Jacobs; Phillips; Styles; Carl Thompson; Angelettie; Isaac Hayes | Carl "Chucky" Thompson; Deric "D-Dot" Angelettie | 4:13 |
| 15. | "Can't Stop, Won't Stop" (featuring Puff Daddy) | Jacobs; Phillips; Styles; Combs; Angelettie; Steven Jordan; Gabriel Jackson | Sean "Puffy" Combs; Deric "D-Dot" Angelettie; Stevie J (co.) | 3:38 |
| 16. | "All for the Love" (Jadakiss solo) | Phillips; Kasseem Dean | Swis-Beatz | 3:33 |
| 17. | "So Right" (featuring Kelly Price) | Jacobs; Phillips; Styles; Combs; Lawrence; James Harris III; Terry Lewis | Sean "Puffy" Combs; Ron "Amen-Ra" Lawrence | 3:30 |
| 18. | "The Snitch" (Interlude) | | Deric "D-Dot" Angelettie; the Lox; Richard "Younglord" Frierson (co.) | 1:31 |
| 19. | "Everybody Wanna Rat" | Jacobs; Phillips; Styles; Anthony Fields; Blackman | Pent P.K.; Dame Grease (co.) | 4:17 |
| 20. | "The Interview, Pt. 2" (Interlude) | | Deric "D-Dot" Angelettie; the Lox; Richard "Younglord" Frierson (co.) | 0:14 |
| 21. | "We'll Always Love Big Poppa" | Jacobs; Phillips; Styles; Blackman | Dame Grease | 5:00 |

• (co.) Co-producer

Sample credits

- "If You Think I'm Jiggy" contains samples from "A Real Mutha for Ya", "Nothing Left to be Desired" by Johnny "Guitar" Watson, and interpolates "Da Ya Think I'm Sexy?" by Rod Stewart.
- "Money, Power & Respect" contains a sample from "New Beginning" by Dexter Wansel
- "Get This $" contains samples from "It’s Your Thing" by Lou Donaldson, "The What" by the Notorious B.I.G., and "It's Your Thing" by the Isley Brothers.
- "Let's Start Rap Over" contains a sample from "Let’s Start Love Over" by Miles Jaye. Written by Micheal Claxton
- "I Wanna Thank You" contains samples from "Yesterday Princess" by Stanley Clarke, "Heavenly Father" by Fu-Schnickens, and "I Want to Thank You" by Alicia Myers
- "Goin' Be Some Shit" contains samples from "Shut the Eff Up Hoe" by MC Lyte, and "Cardova" by the Meters.
- "The Heist, Pt. 1" contains samples from "T.L.C." by Average White Band, and "Long Red" by Mountain.
- "Bitches from Eastwick" contains samples from "Ike’s Mood I/You've Lost That Lovin' Feelin'" by Isaac Hayes, and "Mean Women" by Dap Sugar Willie.
- "Can't Stop, Won't Stop" contains samples from "Spoonin’ Rap" by Spoonie Gee, and "You Can't Stop the Reign" by Shaquille O'Neal.
- "So Right" contains samples from "Encore" by Cheryl Lynn.

== Personnel ==
- Credits for Money, Power & Respect adapted from AllMusic.
- Charles "Prince Charles" Alexander - Mixing
- Deric "D-Dot" Angelettie - Audio Production, Composer, Executive Producer
- Camilo Argumedes - Assistant Engineer
- Carlos "6 July" Broady - Composer, Producer
- Bob Brockman - Mixing
- Rob Carter - Producer
- Sean "Puffy" Combs - Audio Production, Composer, Executive Producer
- Lane Craven - Mixing
- Dame Grease - Audio Production, Keyboards, Producer
- Stephen Dent - Engineer, Mixing
- DMX - Additional Personnel, Featured Artist, Guest Artist, Rap
- John Eaton - Engineer
- Jay Garfield - Producer
- Rasheed Goodlowe - Engineer
- Terri Haskins - Art Direction
- Daniel Hastings - Photography
- Cheryl Jacobsen - Group Member
- Jadakiss - Member of Attributed Artist, Rap
- Steve Jones - Assistant Engineer, Engineer
- S. Jordan - Composer
- Ron Lawrence - Producer
- Jimmie Lee - Engineer
- Lil' Kim - Additional Personnel, Featured Artist, Guest Artist, Rap
- The Lox - Primary Artist, Producer
- Gregg Mann - Engineer
- Tony Maserati - Engineer, Mixing
- Damaris Mercado - Design
- John Meredith - Engineer, Unknown Contributor Role
- Lynn Montrose - Assistant Engineer
- Nasheim Myrick - Audio Production, Composer, Producer
- Michael Patterson - Engineer, Mixing
- Pent P.K. - Producer
- Jayson Phillips - Composer, Group Member
- Herb Powers - Mastering
- Kelly Price - Additional Personnel, Featured Artist, Guest Artist, Vocals
- Puff Daddy - Additional Personnel, Featured Artist, Guest Artist, Rap
- Sheek Louch - Member of Attributed Artist, Rap
- Styles P - Member of Attributed Artist, Rap
- David Styles - Composer, Group Member
- Swizz Beatz - Audio Production
- Carl Thomas - Additional Personnel, Featured Artist, Guest Artist, Rap
- Chucky Thompson - Producer, Vocals (Background)
- Barry White - Grooming
- Rob Williams - Engineer
- Doug Wilson - Engineer
- Young Lord - Producer
- Micheal Claxton - Writer "Let's Start Rap Over"

== Charts ==
=== Weekly charts ===
| Chart (1998) | Peak position |
|---|---|
| Canadian Albums (Billboard) | 11 |
| Canadian R&B Albums (SoundScan) | 1 |
| US Billboard 200 | 3 |
| US Top R&B/Hip-Hop Albums (Billboard) | 1 |

=== Year-end charts ===
| Chart (1998) | Position |
|---|---|
| US Billboard 200 | 127 |
| US Top R&B/Hip-Hop Albums (Billboard) | 28 |

== Certifications ==
| Region | Certification | Certified units/sales |
|---|---|---|
| Canada (Music Canada) | Gold | 50,000^{^} |
| United States (RIAA) | Platinum | 1,000,000^{^} |
^{^} Shipments figures based on certification alone.

== See also ==
- List of number-one R&B albums of 1998 (U.S.)
