= Float (Styles P album) =

Studio album by Styles P
- Released: April 16, 2013
- Recorded: 2012–2013
- Studio: Beast Music Studios (New Rochelle, New York)
- Genre: East Coast hip hop
- Length: 36:24
- Label: High Times
- Producer: Scram Jones

Styles P chronology
The World's Most Hardest MC Project (2012)	Float (2013)	Phantom and the Ghost (2014)

Singles from Float
- 1. "Hater Love" Released: March 5, 2013

Float is the sixth solo studio album by American rapper Styles P. It was released on April 16, 2013, through High Times Records. Recording sessions took place at Beast Music Studios in New Rochelle. Production was handled entirely by Scram Jones. It features guest appearances from Bullpen, N.O.R.E., Raekwon and Scram Jones, as well as his The Lox groupmates Jadakiss and Sheek Louch.

The album debuted at number 124 on the Billboard 200, number 17 on the Top R&B/Hip-Hop Albums, number 14 on the Top Rap Albums and number 25 on the Independent Albums, selling 3,900 copies in the United States in its first week of release.

== Background ==
On February 25, 2013, Styles P announced he would be releasing Float an album entirely produced by Scram Jones on April 20, 2013. The release date was later pushed up to April 16, 2013. On March 5, 2013, the first single "Hater Love" featuring Sheek Louch was released for digital download. On April 4, 2013, the music video was released for "Hater Love" featuring Sheek Louch. On April 8, 2013, the song "Red Eye" featuring Jadakiss was released. On April 20, 2013, the music video was released for "I Need Weed". On May 14, 2013, the music video was released for "Red Eye" featuring Jadakiss.

In a May 2014, interview with XXL, Styles P spoke about the album, saying: "Float was really just a fast project, man. I remember that Sheek was away and Kiss was away, and my engineer Cruz was away. Scram is my homie, I fuck with him, so I needed a studio I could work out of. He live a town away from me, about 15 or 20 minutes, so I would just hop in the ride, go to his place, smoke out, throw a beat on and the joint was done. One day I think we did four or five joints. Whenever I got there, we did joints. I got a lot of love for Scram. He's an authentic beatmaker and producer. I love Scram, Statik, Alchemist, [Dame] Greese, Vinny Idol—those dudes make the sound I fuck with. [Float] didn't start as a project. We just had so much so fast that we thought, "Well, we might as well do something". So we did".

== Critical reception ==
Professional ratings
Aggregate scores
Source	Rating
Metacritic	67/100
Review scores
Source	Rating
AllMusic	3.5/5 stars
Exclaim!	6/10
HipHopDX	3.5/5
laut.de	3/5 stars
RapReviews	4.5/10
XXL	3/5 (L)

Float was met with generally favourable reviews from music critics. At Metacritic, which assigns a normalized rating out of 100 to reviews from mainstream publications, the album received an average score of 67 based on four reviews.

AllMusic's David Jeffries wrote: "think of it as a conceptual street release made for Styles and/or Scram fans and Float succeeds splendidly". Ronald Grant of HipHopDX wrote: "though not his greatest body of work, it places his cunning lyrical skills front and center while showcasing his and Scram Jones' identical ears for quality, bass-heavy production and the fact that gangsters want to have a little fun, too". Peter Marrack of Exclaim! gave the album a six out of ten, saying "Float (the Yonkers, NY rapper's sixth studio album) explores new sonic territory, rooted in gangster rap, but branching into more experimental electronic production. Jones (who made a name for himself producing for NYC's hardest: Wu-Tang, Immortal Technique, Lloyd Banks) starts bare bones with a sample and then extends the sound outward, filling the body of the track with drums. The result isn't groundbreaking, but it's still fresh for Styles".

In mixed reviews, Nick de Molina of XXL concluded: "all in all, the project is a welcome addition to the D-Block rapper's catalogue, though it's [sic] narrow vision holds the album back from reaching any great heights". Grant Jones of RapReviews stated: "minus the niceness of "Manson Murder" and "Hater Love", this should have been a mixtape as it isn't a patch on any of Styles' previous LPs".

== Track listing ==
No.	Title	Writer(s)	Length
1.	"Float Intro"	David Styles; Marc Shemer	1:46
2.	"Manson Murder" (featuring N.O.R.E.)	Styles; Victor Santiago; Shemer	2:54
3.	"Bodies in the Basement"	Styles; Shemer	3:42
4.	"Hater Love" (featuring Sheek Louch)	Styles; Sean Jacobs; Shemer	3:12
5.	"Take It Back"	Styles; Shemer	3:18
6.	"Haze vs. Sour Skit"	Styles; Shemer	0:39
7.	"I Need Weed"	Styles; Shemer	3:51
8.	"Red Eye" (featuring Jadakiss)	Styles; Jason Phillips; Shemer	3:09
9.	"Reckless" (featuring Raekwon)	Styles; Corey Woods; Shemer	2:59
10.	"Shoot You Down"	Styles; Shemer	3:09
11.	"Open Up" (featuring Bullpen)	Styles; Shemer	3:20
12.	"Screw Y'all" (featuring Scram Jones)	Styles; Shemer	4:25
Total length:			36:24

== Personnel ==
- David "Styles P" Styles — vocals, executive producer
- Victor "Noreaga" Santiago — vocals (track 2)
- Sean "Sheek Louch" Jacobs — vocals (track 4)
- Jason "Jadakiss" Phillips — vocals (track 8)
- Corey "Raekwon" Woods — vocals (track 9)
- Bullpen — vocals (track 11)
- Marc "Scram Jones" Shemer — vocals (track 12), producer, recording, executive producer
- Dragan Čačinović — mixing, mastering
- Devin Horwitz — executive producer
- Chad Griffith — photography
- Matt Wyatt — design

== Charts ==
Chart (2013)	Peak position
US Billboard 200	124
US Top R&B/Hip-Hop Albums (Billboard)	17
US Top Rap Albums (Billboard)	14
US Independent Albums (Billboard)	25
