= Phantom and the Ghost =

Studio album by Styles P
- Released: April 29, 2014
- Recorded: 2013–2014
- Genre: Hip hop
- Length: 48:36
- Label: Phantom; New Music Cartel; EMPIRE
- Producer: Black Saun, Buda Da Future, Dayzel, Grandz Muzik, Harry Fraud, Joe Milly, Knucklehead, Maxpayne Shawty, Mr. Devine, Noah "Noodles" Styles, Trey On Da Beatz, Vinny Idol

Styles P chronology
Float (2013)	Phantom and the Ghost (2014)	A Wise Guy and a Wise Guy (2015)

Singles from Phantom and the Ghost
- 1. "Sour" Released: March 25, 2014

Phantom and the Ghost is the seventh studio album by American rapper Styles P. The album was released on April 29, 2014, by Phantom Entertainment, New Music Cartel and Empire Distribution. The album features guest appearances from Sheek Louch, Vado, The Bull Pen, Jadakiss, Rocko, Chris Rivers, Raheem DeVaughn, Shae Lawrence and Dyce Payne.

== Background ==
In a May 2014, interview with XXL, Styles P spoke about the album, saying: "This was really just me wanting to give both sides of my alter ego. I really wanted to deliver a body of work that was different than what's out there, vibe wise. Everything is lyrically driven. I'm blue collar, man—I aim to please those who appreciate the underground. I don't give a fuck when it comes to making music; I give a fuck about the people who give a fuck about the music. Nothing really matters to me about music except the ones who fuck with it. I go for those who love this—the culture of hip-hop. I tell people there's two different industries—there's the rap industry and then there's the hip-hop industry. I'm more of a hip-hop culture dude than a rap industry dude. I try to stick with that form every time. I followed the same formula [with Phantom And The Ghost], which is I try to do a mix of my signature sound and a little something that people can relate to and grasp onto from an O.G. standpoint."

== Singles ==
On March 25, 2014, the album's first single "Sour" featuring Jadakiss and Rocko was released. On April 9, 2014, the music video was released for "Never Safe". On April 16, 2014, the music video was released for "So Deep". On May 1, 2014, the music video was released for "Same Scriptures" featuring Chris Rivers and Dyce Payne. On May 27, 2014, the music video was released for "Sour" featuring Jadakiss and Rocko.

== Critical response ==
Professional ratings
Review scores
Source	Rating
AllMusic	4/5 stars
HipHopDX	3/5 stars
RapReviews	6/10
XXL	(XL)

Phantom and the Ghost was met with generally positive reviews from music critics. Barry Ward of XXL gave the album an XL rating, saying "Phantom And The Ghost spends less time bragging or detailing street life, and more time pondering how things came to be and if it'll ever end. The album is another great addition to Styles P's growing discography that once again gives consciousness to what's going on in the pavement." David Jeffries of AllMusic gave the album four out of five stars, saying "Past the Basquiat-meets-Pac-Man artwork there's the usual Mobb Deep-styled coldness with "Never Safe" and "Creep City" combining for a one-two opening punch with some electro underneath, courtesy of producers Joe Milly and Black Saun, respectively. The beats remain diverse, even returning to the eerie piano-fueled boom-bap on the great "Don't Be Scared," but Styles travels far and wide with his writing pen as well, telling his son a "do as I say, not as I did" story on the key cut "Rude Boy Hip Hop" with Raheem DeVaughn. Put the poppy, Jadakiss-type cut "We Gettin" on the end and Phantom and the Ghost is the big home-run payoff after a string of interesting but B+ albums."

Bruce Smith of HipHopDX gave the album three out of five stars, saying "Phantom and the Ghost appears to try to go too many places it probably shouldn't. Styles' verses are normally on point, but the production is generally a miss. The hooks, provided by either Styles or featured guests miss far too often as well. There are several lyrical gems to be found throughout the project as fans of SP have come to expect, but as a total album, this one comes up short." Grant Jones of RapReviews gave the album a six out of ten, saying "The biggest problem with Phantom and the Ghost however is that we've heard it all before, ten years ago with better, more memorable production. Compared to the underrated Super Gangster album from 2007, this feels closer to a D-Block mixtape with its synthesized stylings and imposing tales of street crime. Nevertheless, it's not a bad Styles P record, and maintains the consistent level of previous records, but that level isn't good enough for a rapper that can still tear it up with the best."

== Commercial performance ==
The album debuted at number 74 on the Billboard 200 chart, with first-week sales of 4,331 copies in the United States.

== Track listing ==
No.	Title	Producer(s)	Length
1.	"Never Safe"	Joe Milly	3:13
2.	"Creep City" (featuring Sheek Louch)	Black Saun	3:07
3.	"Deeper Self"	Buda Da Future, Grandz Muzik	3:21
4.	"World Tour" (featuring Vado)	Joe Milly, Mr. Devine	3:46
5.	"Don't Be Scared" (featuring The Bull Pen)	Vinny Idol	3:35
6.	"Sour" (featuring Jadakiss and Rocko)	Knucklehead	4:27
7.	"Never Trust" (featuring Chris Rivers)	Black Saun	4:13
8.	"Rude Boy Hip Hop" (featuring Raheem DeVaughn)	Noah "Noodles" Styles	2:47
9.	"Other Side" (featuring Shae Lawrence)	Maxpayne Shawty	4:43
10.	"For the Best"	Harry Fraud	3:25
11.	"Smoke All Day" (featuring Dyce Payne)	Dayzel	3:54
12.	"We Gettin"	Trey On Da Beatz	3:44
13.	"Same Scriptures" (Bonus Track)	Dayzel	1:24
14.	"So Deep" (Bonus Track)	Black Saun	2:56

== Charts ==
Chart (2014)	Peak position
US Billboard 200	74
US Top R&B/Hip-Hop Albums (Billboard)	14
US Independent Albums (Billboard)	18
