= Master of Ceremonies (Styles P album) =

Studio album by Styles P
- Released: October 4, 2011
- Recorded: 2010–2011
- Genre: Hip-hop
- Length: 43:27
- Label: Phantom; D-Block; Asti; eOne
- Producer: AraabMuzik; Black Saun; J. Music House; Pete Rock; Phonix Beats; Reefa; Statik Selektah; Supa Stylez; Ty Fyffe; Warren G

Styles P chronology
The Green Ghost Project (2010)	Master of Ceremonies (2011)	The World's Most Hardest MC Project (2012)

Singles from Master of Ceremonies
- 1. "It's OK" Released: June 19, 2011; 2. "Harsh" Released: August 16, 2011; 3. "How I Fly" Released: February 24, 2012

Master of Ceremonies is the fourth solo studio album by American rapper Styles P. It was released on October 4, 2011, via Phantom Entertainment, D-Block Records, Asti, and eOne Music. Production was handled by Phonix Beats, Supa Stylez, AraabMuzik, Black Saun, J. Music House, Pete Rock, Reefa, Statik Selektah, Ty Fyffe and Warren G. It features guest appearances from Sheek Louch, Aja, Avery Storm, Busta Rhymes, Jadakiss, Lloyd Banks, Pharoahe Monch, Pharrell Williams, Rell and Rick Ross.

The album debuted at number 33 on the Billboard 200, number 5 on both the Top R&B/Hip-Hop Albums and the Top Rap Albums, and number 8 on the Independent Albums charts in the United States, selling 11,000 units in its first week.

It was supported with three singles: "It's OK", "Harsh" and "How I Fly".

== Critical reception ==
Professional ratings
Review scores
Source	Rating
AllMusic	4/5 stars
HipHopDX	3.5/5
RapReviews	7/10
XXL	4/5 (XL)

Master of Ceremonies was met with generally favourable reviews from music critics. AllMusic's David Jeffries gave the album four out of five stars, stating: "big money names like Pharrell, Busta Rhymes, and Rick Ross himself fill the guest list, but Styles is as uncompromising and hard as always, filling the middle of this effort with dark, stark, and dirty reminders of life in the ghetto and/or life as a gangster". Ralph Bristout of XXL gave the album an XL rating, saying "despite a loaded list of features and the underwhelming Avery Storm-assisted "How I Fly", Master of Ceremonies exhibits more wins than duds. Holiday certainly lives up to the album's title". Alex Thornton of HipHopDX gave the album three and a half stars out of five, saying "Styles is doing his best to represent the collective properly with his latest solo. While it feels like Master of Ceremonies could have been more, it's a solid effort worth checking out both for fans of Styles specifically and New York rap in general". Steve 'Flash' Juon of RapReviews described the album as "an inoffensive 40+ minutes that won't change the world, with some escapist fantasy tinged by harsh reality, that will keep the core fans happy".

== Track listing ==
No.	Title	Producer(s)	Length
1.	"How I Fly" (featuring Avery Storm)	Warren G	3:10
2.	"We Don't Play" (featuring Lloyd Banks)	Supa Stylez	3:35
3.	"I'm a Gee" (featuring Rell)	Supa Stylez	3:17
4.	"Ryde on da Regular"	AraabMuzik	3:17
5.	"Keep the Faith" (featuring Aja)	J. Music House	5:03
6.	"Children" (featuring Pharoahe Monch)	Pete Rock	3:27
7.	"Street Shit" (featuring Sheek Louch)	Black Saun	3:32
8.	"Feelings Gone"	Statik Selektah	3:28
9.	"Harsh" (featuring Busta Rhymes and Rick Ross)	Phonix Beats	4:17
10.	"It's OK" (featuring Jadakiss)	Phonix Beats	3:31
11.	"Don't Turn Away" (featuring Pharrell Williams)	Reefa	2:57
12.	"Uh-Ohh" (featuring Sheek Louch)	Ty Fyffe	3:53
Total length:			43:27

Best Buy bonus tracks
No.	Title	Producer(s)	Length
13.	"#1 Homie"	Black Key
14.	"Where Angels Sleep"	Ceasar & Pstarr
15.	"Love Barbara"	Warren G

== Charts ==
Chart (2011)	Peak position
US Billboard 200	33
US Top R&B/Hip-Hop Albums (Billboard)	5
US Top Rap Albums (Billboard)	5
US Independent Albums (Billboard)	8
