= Ryde or Die, Bitch =

Single by The Lox featuring Timbaland and Eve

from the album We Are the Streets
- B-side: "We Are the Streets"
- Released: 2000
- Recorded: 1999
- Genre: Dirty rap
- Length: 4:49
- Label: Ruff Ryders; Interscope
- Songwriters: Jadakiss, Sheek Louch, Styles P, Eve
- Producer: Timbaland

The Lox singles chronology
"Recognize" (2000)	"Ryde or Die, Bitch" (2000)	"Wild Out" (2000)

Timbaland singles chronology
"Can't Nobody" (1999)	"Ryde or Die, Bitch" (2000)	"We at It Again" (2000)

Eve singles chronology
"Recognize" (2000)	"Ryde or Die, Bitch" (2000)	"Got It All" (2000)

"Ryde or Die, Bitch" (also known by its clean title, "Ryde or Die, Chick") is the lead single released from The Lox's second album, We Are the Streets. The song was produced by Timbaland and featured Eve. It was the most successful single from the album, peaking at 73 on the US Billboard Hot 100, 27 on the Hot R&B/Hip-Hop Songs and 22 on the Hot Rap Singles.

== Single track listing ==
=== A-Side ===
1. "Ryde or Die, Bitch" (LP Version) - 4:51
2. "Ryde or Die, Bitch" (Radio Edit) - 3:57
3. "Ryde or Die, Bitch" (Instrumental) - 4:51
4. "Ryde or Die, Bitch" (A Capella) - 4:51

=== B-Side ===
1. "We Are the Streets" (LP Version) - 3:41
2. "We Are the Streets" (Radio Edit) - 3:46
3. "We Are the Streets" (Instrumental) - 4:33
4. "Ryde or Die, Bitch" (TV track) - 4:51
