= We Are the Streets =

2000 album by the Lox

Studio album by the Lox
- Released: January 25, 2000
- Recorded: 1999
- Genre: Hip-hop
- Length: 68:30
- Labels: Ruff Ryders; Interscope
- Producers: Swizz Beatz (also exec.); DJ Premier; P.K.; Timbaland

The Lox chronology
Money, Power & Respect (1998)	We Are the Streets (2000)	The Trinity (2013)

Singles from We Are the Streets
- 1. "Recognize" Released: 2000; 2. "Ryde or Die, Bitch" Released: 2000; 3. "Wild Out" Released: 2000

Professional ratings
Review scores
Source	Rating
AllMusic	4/5 stars
Rolling Stone	3.5/5 stars
The Source	3.5/5 stars
USA Today	2.5/4 stars

We Are the Streets is the second studio album by hip-hop group the Lox. Originally scheduled for a January 11, 2000, release, the album was released on January 25, 2000, by Ruff Ryders Entertainment and Interscope Records. It is their second album and is mainly produced by Swizz Beatz. Its commercial success was driven primarily by the singles "Wild Out," produced by Swizz Beatz; and "Ryde or Die, Bitch", produced by Timbaland.

== Commercial performance ==
We Are the Streets debuted and peaked at number 5 on the Billboard 200, with first week sales of 152,000 copies. The album has since been certified Gold by the Recording Industry Association of America (RIAA) for shipping and selling over 500,000 copies in America.

== Track listing ==
No.	Title	Writer(s)	Producer(s)	Length
1.	"Intro" (skit)			2:45
2.	"Fuck You"	David Styles; Sean Jacobs; Jason Phillips; Darrin Dean; Kasseem Dean	Swizz Beatz	4:07
3.	"Can I Live" (featuring Kasino)	Styles; Jacobs; Phillips; D. Dean; Kimani Davis; K. Dean	Swizz Beatz	4:10
4.	"Built for Bodies" (skit)			1:06
5.	"Breathe Easy"	Styles; Jacobs; Phillips; D. Dean; Anthony Fields	P.K.	4:08
6.	"Felony Niggas" (performed by Styles P)	Styles; D. Dean; K. Dean	Swizz Beatz	3:59
7.	"Wild Out"	Styles; Jacobs; Phillips; D. Dean; K. Dean	Swizz Beatz	5:27
8.	"Blood Pressure" (performed by Jadakiss)	Phillips; D. Dean; K. Dean	Swizz Beatz	3:46
9.	"Recognize"	Styles; Jacobs; Phillips; D. Dean; Christopher Martin	DJ Premier	4:13
10.	"Rape'n U Records" (skit)			2:39
11.	"Y'all Fucked Up Now"	Styles; Jacobs; Phillips; D. Dean; K. Dean	Swizz Beatz	4:30
12.	"Scream L.O.X."	Styles; Jacobs; Phillips; D. Dean; Fields	P.K.	3:51
13.	"U Told Me" (featuring Eve)	Jacobs; D. Dean; K. Dean	Swizz Beatz	4:53
14.	"Brains... (Take: 1)" (skit)			0:58
15.	"Ryde or Die, Bitch" (featuring Timbaland and Eve)	Styles; Jacobs; Phillips; D. Dean; Timothy Mosley	Timbaland	4:49
16.	"Bring It On" (performed by Sheek Louch)	Styles; Jacobs; Phillips; D. Dean; K. Dean	Swizz Beatz	4:45
17.	"If You Know" (featuring Swizz Beatz, Drag-On, and Eve)	Styles; Jacobs; Phillips; D. Dean; K. Dean; Melvin Smalls; Eve Jeffers	Swizz Beatz	3:40
18.	"We Are the Streets"	Styles; Jacobs; Phillips; K. Dean	Swizz Beatz	4:33

Notes

- Tracks 1, 2, 4, 10, and 14 are removed from the clean version of the album.
- The album credits mistakenly mix up the credits for "U Told Me" and "Bring It On". The former includes all three members, while the latter is a Sheek solo track.

== Personnel ==
- Chauncey – mixing (17)
- Tony Dawsey – mastering
- Chivon Dean – executive in charge of production
- Darrin "Dee" Dean – executive producer
- Joaquin "Waah" Dean – executive producer
- E-Plugg – engineer (2, 3, 5–8, 11–13, 16, 17)
- Don Elliot – engineer (9)
- Rich Keller – mixing (2, 3, 5–8, 11–13, 16–18)
- DJ Premier – mixing (9)
- Swizz Beatz – associate executive producer
- Chris Theis – engineer and mixing (18)
- Timbaland – engineer and mixing (15)

== Charts ==
=== Weekly charts ===
Chart (2000)	Peak position
UK R&B Albums (Official Charts)	28
US Billboard 200	5
US Top R&B/Hip-Hop Albums (Billboard)	2

=== Year-end charts ===
Chart (2000)	Position
US Billboard 200	159
US Top R&B/Hip-Hop Albums (Billboard)	42

== Certifications ==
Region	Certification	Certified units/sales
United States (RIAA)	Gold	500,000^{^}
^{^} Shipments figures based on certification alone.
