= Styles P =

American rapper (born 1974)

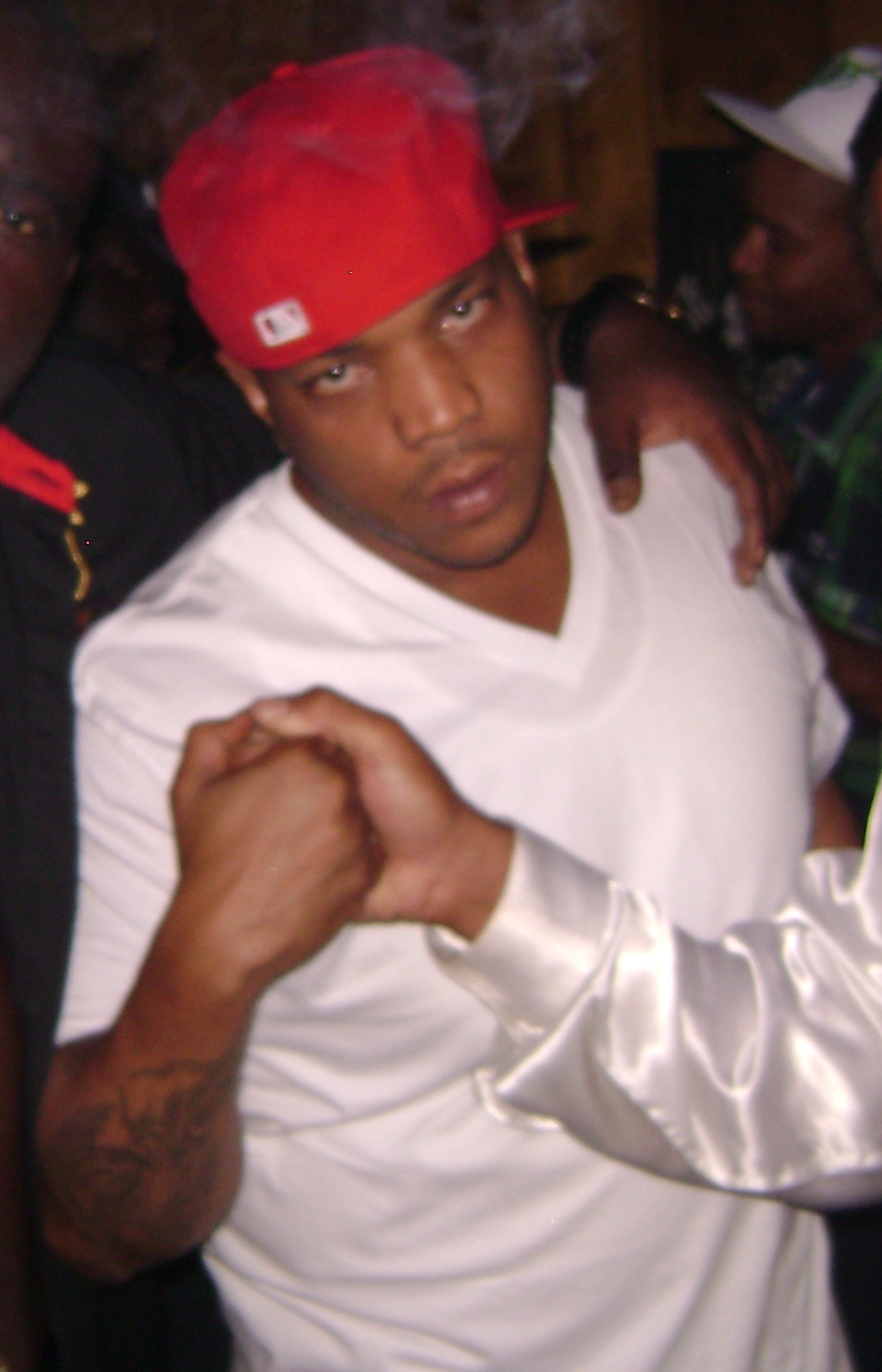
- Styles P in 2010

Background information
- Also known as: Big Dave; Styles; Styles Paniro; Holiday Styles; the Ghost; The Phantom
- Born: David R. Styles; November 28, 1974 (age 51); Queens, New York City, U.S.
- Origin: Yonkers, New York, U.S.
- Genre: East Coast hip-hop
- Occupations: Rapper; songwriter
- Works: Styles P discography
- Years active: 1994–present
- Labels: D-Block; Phantom; High Times; MNRK; Nature Sounds; Ruff Ryders; Interscope; Bad Boy
- Member of: The Lox
- Formerly of: Ruff Ryders
- Spouse: Adjua Styles (m. 1994)
- Children: 1
- Website: stylesp.net

David R. Styles (born November 28, 1974), better known by his stage name Styles P (also known mononymously as Styles), is an American rapper, best known as a member of East Coast hip-hop group The Lox. Formed with fellow rappers Sheek Louch and Jadakiss in 1994, the group was also part of the Ruff Ryders Entertainment collective.

As a solo act, Styles signed with Ruff Ryders' parent label, Interscope Records, to release his debut studio album, A Gangster and a Gentleman (2002). Its lead single, "Good Times," peaked at number 22 on the US Billboard Hot 100, while the album peaked at number six on the Billboard 200. He guest appeared alongside Jadakiss on Jennifer Lopez' 2002 single "Jenny from the Block," as well as Senegalese-American singer Akon's 2004 single "Locked Up" — both songs peaked within the top ten of the Billboard Hot 100.

He has since released the albums Time Is Money (2006), Super Gangster (Extraordinary Gentleman) (2007), Master of Ceremonies (2011), The World's Most Hardest MC Project (2012), Float (2013), Phantom and the Ghost (2014), A Wise Guy and a Wise Guy (2015), and G-Host (2018).

== Early life ==
David R. Styles was born November 28, 1974, in Corona, Queens, New York City, to a South African mother, a Zulu woman from Clermont, KwaZulu-Natal, and a Jamaican father. After his parents' divorce, Styles and his younger brother Gary moved to Yonkers, New York with their mother. It was there that he met lifelong friends Jadakiss and Sheek Louch. The trio bonded over their shared passion for hip-hop and eventually formed a group known as The Lox in 1994.

== Career ==
=== 1994–2000: The Lox ===
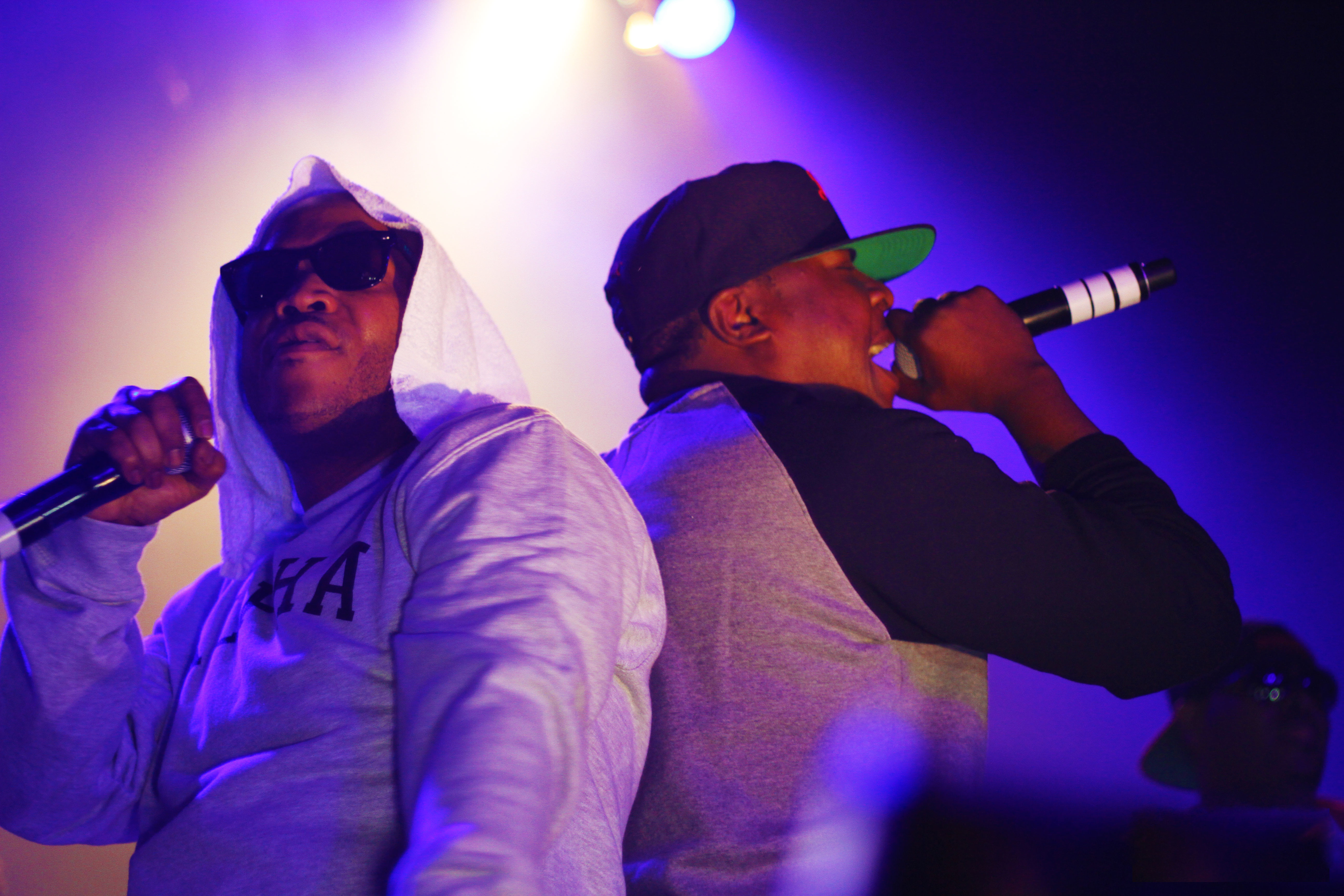
Styles P (left) performing with Jadakiss

As a trio, the Lox began rapping in the mid-1990s and started to build a steady underground following thanks to their performances and street freestyles. In their late teens, the trio met Mary J. Blige who was impressed with their lyrical content, and gave their demo to Sean "Puffy" Combs. Combs immediately hired the trio to write for Bad Boy Records. After signing with Bad Boy, the Lox quickly started collaborating on hits with Combs, the Notorious B.I.G., Mary J. Blige and Mariah Carey which gave them instant notoriety and status within the hip-hop and mainstream charts. In 1996 and 1997, the group wrote and performed on a number of Diddy hits, including "It's All About the Benjamins" and "I Got the Power", Mase's "24 Hrs. to Live", Mariah Carey's "Honey", the Notorious B.I.G.'s "Last Day" and Mary J. Blige's "Can't Get You Off My Mind". In 1997, the Lox received international acclaim when their tribute to the late Biggie Smalls, "We'll Always Love Big Poppa", was picked as the B-side track from Combs' No Way Out album (3× Platinum) with the number one hit, "I'll Be Missing You". This single was the most played hit in 1997, which opened the door for the Lox's to write more of their own songs and eventually release their first album in January 1998 titled Money, Power & Respect. The album went on to be certified platinum, and, although the album was a chart-topping success, the group grew to feel that the glossy image and production style of Bad Boy Records conflicted with their grimier rap aesthetic. After trying and failing to get Combs to grant them a release from their contract, the group confronted him in his office, with Styles P throwing a chair at his own boss. After this, the group was granted their release and left Bad Boy to sign with Ruff Ryders Entertainment and Interscope Records.

=== 2000–2007: Ruff Ryders and solo albums ===
After releasing another Lox album, We Are the Streets and appearing on albums with other Ruff Ryders artists, Styles released his first solo album, A Gangster and a Gentleman, in 2002. The album was supported by the hit single, Good Times, which peaked at number 22 on the US Billboard Hot 100 and number 6 on the Billboard Hot R&B/Hip-Hop Songs. The song also received widespread airplay on the radio throughout 2002. In 2004, Styles was featured on an alternate version of Akon's hit debut single, Locked Up. Two years later, he released his second album, Time is Money on Ruff Ryders. In 2007, Styles would leave Ruff Ryders and Interscope to independently release his third studio album Super Gangster (Extraordinary Gentleman) on D-Block Records and Koch Records.

=== 2010–2014: The Green Ghost and various mixtapes ===
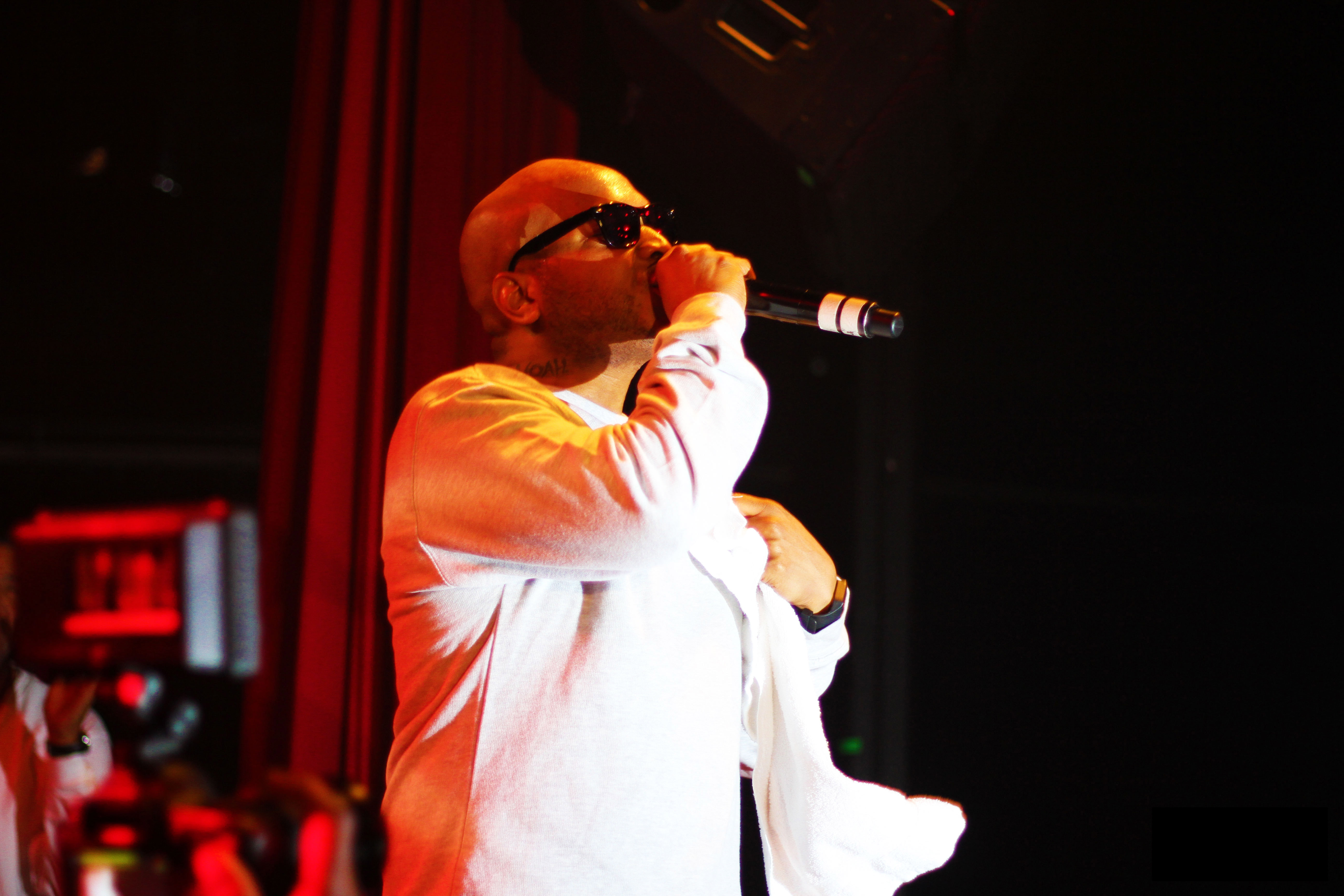
Styles P in 2014

After recording many mixtapes Styles returned to the Hip-Hop scene by releasing two retail albums in 2010, The Green Ghost Project with DJ Green Lantern on Invasion Records and The Ghost Dub-Dime a retail mixtape on E1 Records (formally Koch Records). This began a string of annual retail releases with his fourth, fifth, sixth, and seventh albums (2011's Master of Ceremonies, 2012's The World's Most Hardest MC Project, 2013's Float, and 2014's Phantom and the Ghost) all being released within a year of each other.

=== 2016–present: The Lox reunion ===
In 2016, the Lox released their first album in 16 years, Filthy America... It's Beautiful. The album reached number 6 on the Billboard Top R&B/Hip-Hop Albums chart. It was followed by the release of the albums, G-Host (2018), Dime Bag (2018), S.P. the GOAT: Ghost of All Time (2019) and Presence (2019). Styles P and Dave East also released a collab album titled Beloved, in 2018. Styles P's 13th studio album, Styles David: Ghost Your Enthusiasm, was released on May 22, 2020.

== Personal life ==
Styles is a vegan.

Styles married his wife Adjua on July 31, 1995. Together, they have two children, Noah (born 1998) and Tai (1995–2015), whom Adjua had from a previous relationship. Styles served as Tai's stepfather for the majority of her life, until she committed suicide in 2015.

Styles' younger brother, Gary Quarles Styles, died in a car accident on May 13, 2001. Styles has made many references to Gary in his music, including the tribute song "My Brother", from his debut album A Gangster and a Gentleman.

In July 2002, Styles was involved in an altercation at a New York nightclub that led to him stabbing a man in the buttocks. Styles surrendered himself to authorities on November 26, 2002, and began serving his eight-month sentence in the Westchester County Jail in Valhalla, New York, the same day. Styles was released from prison on August 4, 2003.

== Business ventures ==
Both Styles and Jadakiss launched a local juice bar called "Juices for Life" in 2011, there are currently six locations in New York. In 2018, Styles and his wife Adjua launched a local health food store called "Farmacy for Life". Styles P launched a Web3 Music NFT project called "The Farmacy Fantoms" with Gregory Cohen known as MΞT∆DUTCH and Daniel Dapaah. Styles collaborated with artist Dino Belli to launch the project on his birthday in 2022. They sold out 6,666 Farmacy Fantoms in two weeks and have over 1,000 holders. Holders receive discounts on brands, access to shows and events, and all the intellectual property associated with the NFT such as the instrumentals, acapellas, and stems.

== Other projects ==
Styles P released his first novel, Invincible, in 2010 through Random House Publishing Group. In 2011 he opened up a juice bar in the Bronx called Juices for Life with his business partners Nyger Rollocks and Leo Galvez. He released his EP with Currensy titled, #The1st28 on February 28, 2012.

Styles P appeared on the sixteenth season of Marriage Boot Camp with his wife, Adjua in 2020.

In February 2022, he was cast in the documentary series Everything's Gonna Be All White, airing on Showtime.

== Discography ==
Studio albums

- A Gangster and a Gentleman (2002)
- Time is Money (2006)
- Super Gangster (Extraordinary Gentleman) (2007)
- Master of Ceremonies (2011)
- The World's Most Hardest MC Project (2012)
- Float (2013)
- Phantom and the Ghost (2014)
- A Wise Guy and a Wise Guy (2015)
- G-Host (2018)
- Dime Bag (2018)
- S.P. the GOAT: Ghost of All Time (2019)
- Presence (2019)
- Styles David: Ghost Your Enthusiasm (2020)
- Ghosting (2021)
- Penultimate: A Calm Wolf Is Still a Wolf (2023)

Collaboration albums

- The Green Ghost Project (with DJ Green Lantern) (2010)
- #The1st28 (with Currensy) (2012)
- The Seven (with Talib Kweli) (2017)
- Vibes (with Berner) (2017)
- Beloved (with Dave East) (2018)
- Wreckage Manner (with Havoc) (2021)

== Bibliography ==
- Invinicible by Styles P (2010: Random House Publishing Group, 240 pages). ISBN 978-0-345-50752-5. A Novel.
