= The Lox =

American hip hop group

- Also known as: The Bomb Squad, D-Block, The Warlox
- Origin: Yonkers, New York, U.S.
- Genre: Hip-hop
- Works: The Lox discography
- Years active: 1994–present
- Labels: D-Block; Roc Nation; Interscope; Ruff Ryders; Bad Boy
- Spinoff of: Ruff Ryders
- Members: Jadakiss; Styles P Sheek Louch

The Lox (stylized The LOX or The L.O.X.) is an American hip hop trio from Yonkers, New York composed of rappers Sheek Louch, Styles P and Jadakiss. The group formed in 1994 and signed with Puff Daddy's Bad Boy Records two years later to release their debut studio album, Money, Power & Respect (1998).

Despite critical and commercial success, the group parted ways with the label in favor of Ruff Ryders Entertainment in 1999, through which they released their similarly successful follow-up, We Are the Streets (2000).

== History ==
=== Formation and career beginnings (1994–1996) ===
Jason "Jadakiss" Phillips, David "Styles P" Styles, and Sean "Sheek Louch" Jacobs began their musical careers in their hometown of Yonkers, New York. As high school students, they formed a group called the Bomb Squad and began performing at local shows and producing their own demos. In 1994, they appeared on Main Source's "Set It Off" from the album Fuck What You Think.

While the local rap scene was being dominated by artists like Raw Rome, Lord Devon and a young DMX, the group began to gain attention for their lyrical style and ability to present tales of urban life. The group eventually changed their name to the Warlox and continued developing a fan base by appearing on underground mixtapes. The trio later connected with Jaz-O, who produced I Got The Power for their demo tape.

One of their admirers was the "Queen of hip hop soul," fellow Yonkers native Mary J. Blige. After acquiring the demo tape that the group made with Jaz-O, Blige passed it on to Bad Boy CEO Sean "Puffy" Combs who signed them to a deal and added I Got The Power from their demo to his own debut No Way Out. At the behest of Combs, the Warlox later changed their name to the L.O.X. After signing with Bad Boy, the Lox started gaining a bigger buzz off the strength of their first single "Well, Well, Well" featuring Kasino, which appeared on DJ Clue's 1996 mixtape Show Me the Money.

=== Mainstream success (1997–2000) ===
The Lox gained national exposure in 1997 with an onside collaboration on Sean "Puffy" Combs' single "It's All About the Benjamins", shortly after gaining additional exposure with their multi-platinum tribute to The Notorious B.I.G., "We'll Always Love Big Poppa". The trio later appeared on a multitude of hits, Mase's "24 Hrs. to Live", Mariah Carey's "Honey", and Jennifer Lopez's "Jenny from the Block". The group's debut album Money, Power & Respect, went Platinum by the RIAA.

In the summer of 1999, the trio found themselves disappointed with the direction of Bad Boy, and the trio wanted to be released from their contract in order to join Ruff Ryders. The Ruff Ryders had always served as The Lox's managers and the group felt like the new label could better represent the hard-core sensibilities which they expressed in their rhymes. Bad Boy was known for its radio-friendly dance hits and high-priced videos, while the Lox were quickly establishing themselves as hardcore rap artists. The identities clashed — "We just needed to be with a rougher label," said Sheek Louch. "A harder label that fit our image."

The Lox tried all of the legal maneuvering available to be released from their contract with Bad Boy. However, the lawyers and conference calls did not work. At a New York rap concert, the trio sported "Let The LOX Go" T-shirts and sparked a grassroots movement to "Free The Lox." Pressure resulting from the campaign ultimately caused Bad Boy and Puff Daddy to release the trio from their contract. "We really changed the game by doing that," says Styles concerning the contractual drama. "It might take years from now, but other people are gonna do it. We made it so they don't have to be scared to speak up."

=== Hiatus and resurgence (2001–2020) ===
During the years that followed, the group contemplated signing to other labels as a collective. All the while working on music, each member continued to record and release various solo studio albums.

A collaborative album with the Wu-Tang Clan was released in 2012 titled Wu Block, bringing together two historic groups on an album. The result was billed as a collaborative album between members Sheek Louch and the Wu-Tang Clan's Ghostface Killah. In June 2013, Jadakiss told XXL magazine that several labels, including Bad Boy and Maybach Music Group, made offers to release the next Lox album.

On December 18, 2013, the group released a surprise extended play (EP) titled The Trinity, on iTunes. The EP debuted at number 141 on the US Billboard 200 chart, selling 8,400 copies in its first week. On February 24, 2014, the Lox announced a worldwide concert tour, named after their EP The Trinity.

On March 1, 2014, the Lox continued their release of new music with a song titled "New York", which was premiered by Funkmaster Flex. "New York" saw the three Yonkers emcees rap over a beat reminiscent of which samples the Pudgee, Biggie-assisted "Think Big" featuring Lord Tariq, backed by the "Ashley's Roachclip" drum break. On March 16, 2014, the Lox released the music video for "Faded", from their Trinity EP. On March 24, 2014, the music video for "New York", was released.

Filthy America... It's Beautiful was their third studio album, and their first in 16 years. The album was released on December 16, 2016, by D-Block Records and Roc Nation.

In 2020, they released the song "Loyalty & Love", which was later included on their fourth studio album, Living Off Xperience, released on August 28, 2020.

=== Verzuz against The Diplomats and aftermath (2021–present) ===
The Lox (Jadakiss, Styles P and Sheek Louch) and DipSet (Cam'ron, Jim Jones, Juelz Santana and Freekey Zekey) went head-to-head in a highly anticipated Verzuz battle at the Hulu Theater at Madison Square Garden Tuesday, August 3rd. It was a no-nonsense New York hip-hop fight, and while no one got killed, unlike previous confrontations, the lyrical assassination committed with malice aforethought by the Lox should be against the law. Someone call Westchester County District Attorney Mimi Rocah to charge the Yonkers trio with premeditated murder by microphone, voluntary microphone manslaughter in the first degree and assault with a deadly microphone. It wasn't merely a slaughter, it was a lyrical summary execution!

— AJ Woodson's lead paragraph in his article in the July/August 2021 issue of Black Westchester on the Verzuz battle between the Lox and the Diplomats

On August 3, 2021, the Lox participated in a battle with Harlem rap group The Diplomats (DipSet) via Timbaland and Swizz Beatz' Verzuz at the Hulu Theater at Madison Square Garden. They were widely regarded as defeating the Diplomats decisively with professionalism and preparedness attributed as major factors. Moments in the battle included Jadakiss calling out the Diplomats for rapping over tracks, including their vocals, instead of using TV tracks. Jadakiss then performed his freestyle over The Notorious B.I.G.'s "Who Shot Ya?" released on his 2010 mixtape The Champ Is Here, Pt. 3. The Lox responded to the Diplomats jabs with chosen songs.

First, Jadakiss responded to Cam'ron's remark before performing "Welcome to New York City" that the Lox did not have a New York record that could not beat it. Jadakiss responded with his verse in Ja Rule's "New York" that also featured Fat Joe, who was in attendance. Jadakiss also performed the verse when Fat Joe and Ja Rule faced each other in the subsequent Verzuz at the same venue.

A Juelz Santana jab after Cam'ron's "Hey Ma" that the Lox had no records for female fans was then responded to with a medley that included "Ryde or Die, Bitch" featuring Eve followed by remixes featuring them of Mariah Carey's "Honey", Jennifer Lopez's "Jenny from the Block" and Mary J. Blige's "Family Affair", plus Sheek Louch's "Good Love" and Jadakiss' "Knock Yourself Out". Styles P also shouted out incarcerated ByrdGang member Max B – who Jim Jones had an ongoing feud with – before performing his verses in Akon's "Locked Up".

Following their victory, streams of Lox music increased by 215%. In the same month, the group was featured on "Jesus Lord pt 2", the final track on Kanye West's 10th album Donda alongside Jay Electronica, and received the key to the city of Yonkers. Just over a year after the battle while they were performing at LL Cool J's Rock The Bells festival at Forest Hills Stadium in Queens, Jadakiss presented Styles P and Sheek Louch with Lox championship rings and unveiled his.

== Discography ==
Studio albums

- Money, Power & Respect (1998)
- We Are the Streets (2000)
- Filthy America... It's Beautiful (2016)
- Living Off Xperience (2020)

== Awards and nominations ==
=== Grammy Awards ===
Year	Nominee / work	Award	Result
2022	Donda (as a featured artist)	Album of the Year	Nominated

=== MTV Video Music Awards ===
Year	Nominee / work	Award	Result
1998	"It's All About the Benjamins (Rock Remix)" (with Puff Daddy, Lil Kim, The Notorious B.I.G. and Fuzzbubble)	Video of the Year	Nominated
1998	"It's All About the Benjamins (Rock Remix)" (with Puff Daddy, Lil Kim, The Notorious B.I.G. and Fuzzbubble)	Viewer's Choice	Won
