= Silverback (disambiguation) =

A silverback is an adult male gorilla.

Silverback(s) may also refer to:

== Music ==
- "Silverback", a song by Tara VanFlower from My Little Fire-Filled Heart, 2005
- Silverbacks (band), Irish musical group

== People ==
- Seth Petruzelli, mixed martial arts fighter, nicknamed "The Silverback"
- Trent Williams, an American professional footballer for the San Francisco 49ers, nicknamed "Silverback"
- Jason Dunstall, former Australian Rules full-forward for the Hawthorn Hawks, nicknamed "Silverback", among others

== Sports teams ==
- Atlanta Silverbacks, an American professional soccer team
- Cincinnati Silverbacks, an indoor soccer club
- Miami Valley/Dayton Silverbacks, a former professional indoor football team
- Quad Cities Silverbacks, an International Fight League team
- Salmon Arm Silverbacks, a Tier II Junior "A" ice hockey team

== Other uses ==
- Luina, a genus of plants commonly known as silverback
- Silverback Cargo Freighters, a cargo airline
- Silverback Films, a film production company acquired by All3Media in 2020
- Silverback Productions, aka Silverback Games, a Canadian video game developer
- iPhone (1st generation), a mobile phone nicknamed "silverback" for its aluminium back plate
- Goldback, manufacturer of silver notes known as a Silverback

== See also ==
- Atlanta Silverbacks Park, a sports complex outside Atlanta, Georgia, US
- Silverback Awards, film awards given at the Rwandan Film Festival
- Silverback Gorilla, a 2008 album by rapper Sheek Louch
- Silverback Gorilla 2, a 2015 album by rapper Sheek Louch
- Silverback Open Championships, breaking competition held to date in Philadelphia, Pennsylvania, 2014-2018
