= Red Spyda =

American hip hop producer (born 1975)

- Also known as: Spyda; Rush
- Born: Andy Thelusma; December 5, 1975 (age 49)
- Origin: Miami, Florida, U.S.
- Genres: Hip hop; R&B
- Occupations: Record producer; musician; rapper
- Years active: 1996–present
- Labels: Red Beam

Andy Thelusma (born December 5, 1975), better known by his stage name Red Spyda, is an American musician and record producer from Miami, Florida, specializing in hip-hop and R&B music.

During his career, he produced several high-charting singles such as Royce da 5′9″'s "Rock City", G-Unit's "Wanna Get to Know You" and Twista's "Sunshine". He also has produced songs for the likes of Trina, Layzie Bone, Cage, Trick Daddy, Lil' Flip, D12, 8Ball & MJG, The Lox, Mobb Deep, Guerilla Black, I-20, Jacki-O, Amerie, Mad Skillz, Lil' Kim, Lumidee, Saigon and Ghostface Killah, remixed songs for Ruff Endz and 2Pac, and collaborated with DJ Whoo Kid.

Other notable works by Thelusma under his less commonly used alias Rush, have included his contributions to the soundtrack of 2001 video game Grand Theft Auto III. He produced background music for the in-game fictional radio station Game FM (the name is derived from Game Recordings; several of the hip-hop label's artists such as Royce da 5′9″ appeared on the radio station) and also has production credits in the game for two freestyles and previously released songs featured in the game.

He moved to New York City in the early 2000. DJ Stretch Armstrong introduced Thelusma to DJ Whoo Kid and Eminem. Whoo Kid, who was G-Unit's deejay at the time, acquainted him with 50 Cent, which led Spyda to participate in several G-Unit/Shady camp projects up until 2004 inclusive.

In 2004 Thelusma contributed his production duties on D12's "Leave Dat Boy Alone" from D12 World, Jadakiss's "Kiss of Death" from the album of the same name (the LP also featured Eminem on the L.O.X. song "Welcome to D-Block"), Young Buck's "Welcome to the South" from Straight Outta Ca$hville and 2Pac's posthumous Eminem-produced Loyal to the Game (which also featured guest appearance from Jadakiss) to name a few. 2004 also saw the release of Ja Rule's single "New York" with Fat Joe and Jadakiss, which sparked feud between 50 Cent and Jadakiss as the latter took part in G-Unit/Shady rival song. In 2005, the L.O.X. member Sheek Louch released his second studio album After Taxes, which contains three songs produced by Red Spyda, including 50 Cent diss track "Maybe If I Sing". Furthermore, Spyda went on to produce two songs each for Sheek's next two solo projects - Silverback Gorilla (2008) and Donnie G: Don Gorilla (2010) - as well as for his 2012 collaboration album with Ghostface Killah, Wu Block.

== Production credits ==
Year	Song	Artist(s)	Album	Notes
1999	"As the World Turns"	50 Cent, Bun B	Power of the Dollar	
2000	"Take Me"	Trina, Pamela Long	Da Baddest Bitch	
2000	"Blum Blum"	Jovishes, Akira, G-Ride, Lil Heat	Scriptures of the King	
2000	"Sex Gunz"	Jovishes, Christina Estiverne	Scriptures of the King	
2000	"Riot"	Jovishes, Christina Estiverne	Scriptures of the King	
2000	"March 4 Me"	Jovishes, Chinkie Eye	Scriptures of the King	
2001	"Thug by Nature"	Layzie Bone	Thug by Nature	prod. w/ BB
2001	"Get Smart"	Fabolous	Ghetto Fabolous	
2002	"U Not Like Me"	50 Cent	Guess Who's Back?	
2002	"(Down) The Left Hand Path"	Cage	Movies for the Blind	
2002	"Ain't No Santa"	Trick Daddy	Thug Holiday	
2002	"Adrenaline Rush"	Obie Trice	8 Mile: Music from and Inspired by the Motion Picture	
2002	"Rock City"	Bad Meets Evil	Rock City	
2002	"Great Expectations"	Marvalous	The Wonder Years	
2002	"Slut"	P-Life & Slykat	Dope	
2002	"Some People"	P-Life & Slykat	Dope	
2002	"Trust"	P-Life & Slykat	Dope	
2002	"Spit Game"	Royce da 5′9″, Pretty Ugly	Grand Theft Auto III	
2002	"Runnin'"	Royce da 5′9″	One Big Trip	
2003	"Let's Go"	Tre Little	Midnight Club II	
2003	"True Loyalty"	G-Unit	The New Breed	
2003	"Realest Niggas"	Notorious B.I.G., 50 Cent	Bad Boys II: The Soundtrack	co-prod. by DJ Whoo Kid
2003	"The Realist Killaz"	2Pac, 50 Cent	Tupac: Resurrection (Music From and Inspired By the Motion Picture)	
2003	"Wanna Get to Know You"	G-Unit, Joe	Beg for Mercy	
2004	"Sunshine"	Twista, Anthony Hamilton	Kamikaze	
2004	"Check (Let's Ride)"	Lil' Flip	U Gotta Feel Me	
2004	"Where I'm From"	Lil' Flip, Grafh, Gravy, Will-Lean	U Gotta Feel Me	
2004	"Leave Dat Boy Alone"	D12	D12 World	add. prod. by Eminem & Luis Resto
2004	"Memphis City Blues"	8Ball & MJG	Living Legends	
2004	"Kiss of Death"	Jadakiss, Styles P	Kiss of Death	
2004	"Real Niggaz"	Mobb Deep	Amerikaz Nightmare	
2004	"Welcome to the South"	Young Buck, David Banner, Lil' Flip	Straight Outta Ca$hville	
2004	"Guerilla City"	Guerilla Black	Guerilla City	
2004	"OG Anthem"	I-20, Butch Cassidy	Self Explanatory	
2004	"Living It Up"	Jacki-O, Odaymia	Poe Little Rich Girl	
2004	"Sugar Walls"	Jacki-O	Poe Little Rich Girl	
2004	"Gangsta Bitch"	Jacki-O	Poe Little Rich Girl	
2004	"Somebody's Getting Fucked"	Jacki-O	Poe Little Rich Girl	
2004	"Hennessey (Red Spyda Remix)"	2Pac, E.D.I., Sleepy Brown	Loyal to the Game	
2004	"The Banger"	Cokane, TCK, Greedy Black, Gucciano,	AMZ Presents Can't Sleep On It	
2004	"Big Chevys"	Gucciano, Cokane, TCK	AMZ Presents Can't Sleep On It	
2004	"Bag It Up"	Gucciano, TCK, Greedy Black	AMZ Presents Can't Sleep On It	
2005	"Falling"	Amerie	Touch	vocal prod. by Amerie
2005	"Do It Real Big"	Skillz	Confessions of a Ghostwriter	
2005	"Spell Check"	Lil' Kim	The Naked Truth	
2005	"Maybe If I Sing"	Sheek Louch	After Taxes	
2005	"Kiss Your Ass Goodbye (Remix)"	Sheek Louch, Fabolous, Beanie Sigel, T.I.	After Taxes	
2005	"Kiss Your Ass Goodbye"	Sheek Louch, Styles P	After Taxes	
2006	"Naughty"	Kev Samples, Petey Pablo	The Rush	
2006	"Put It on Me"	Kev Samples	The Rush	
2006	"Stop Playin Games"	Kev Samples	The Rush	
2006	"We Are One"	Kev Samples	The Rush	
2006	"Actin Up"	Kev Samples	The Rush	
2006	"A Street Story"	Kev Samples	The Rush	
2007	"In It for the Money"	Lumidee, Snoop Dogg	Unexpected	
2007	"Breakdown"	Ky-Mani Marley	Radio	
2008	"No More"	Jamosa	Cry	
2008	"Good Love"	Sheek Louch	Silverback Gorilla	
2008	"2 Turntables & a Mic"	Sheek Louch	Silverback Gorilla	
2009	"Fly Like Me"	B.o.B	B.o.B vs. Bobby Ray	
2010	"Make Some Noise"	Sheek Louch, Fabolous	Donnie G: Don Gorilla	prod. w/ Pree-Recorded
2010	"Dinner Guest"	The Lox, The Bully	Donnie G: Don Gorilla	
2011	"What the Lovers Do"	Saigon, Devin the Dude	The Greatest Story Never Told	add. prod. by Just Blaze
2012	"Brand New Day"	Klashnekoff	Fuck the Long Talk	prod. w/ DJ Whoo KId
2012	"Stick N Move"	Klashnekoff	Fuck the Long Talk	prod. w/ DJ Whoo KId
2012	"Stick Up Kids"	Ghostface Killah, Sheek Louch, Jadakiss	Wu Block	
