= Sunshine (Twista song) =

2004 single by Twista

Single by Twista featuring Anthony Hamilton

from the album Kamikaze
- Released: August 2, 2004
- Length: 3:51
- Label: Atlantic
- Songwriters: Carl Mitchell; Anthony Hamilton; Andy Thelusma; Bill Withers; Skip Scarborough
- Producer: Red Spyda

Twista singles chronology
"So Sexy" (2004)	"Sunshine" (2004)	"So Sexy Chapter II (Like This)" (2004)

"Sunshine" is the fourth single released from American rapper Twista's fourth album, Kamikaze. The song did not find success in the United States, but in the United Kingdom, "Sunshine" peaked at number three on the UK Singles Chart. "Sunshine" features R&B singer Anthony Hamilton and was produced by Red Spyda. Boo & Gotti make cameo appearances throughout the video.

== Composition ==
"Sunshine" heavily samples Bill Withers' 1977 hit, "Lovely Day." The Twista track begins with a lengthy sample of "Lovely Day"; additionally, the chorus is a reworded version of the original Withers chorus.

== Track listings ==
Australian CD single

1. "Sunshine" (album version featuring Anthony Hamilton)
2. "Front Porch" (featuring Danny Boy)
3. "Legit Ballers"

European CD single

1. "Sunshine" (explicit album version featuring Anthony Hamilton)
2. "Legit Ballers" (LP version with the Speedknot Mobstaz)

UK CD1

1. "Sunshine" (edited album version featuring Anthony Hamilton) – 3:44
2. "Front Porch" (featuring Danny Boy) – 5:20

UK CD2

1. "Sunshine" (explicit album version featuring Anthony Hamilton) – 3:44
2. "Sunshine" (instrumental) – 3:44
3. "Overnight Celebrity" (remix featuring Bump J and Cam'ron—explicit) – 3:29
4. "Sunshine" (album version video) – 3:44
5. "Slow Jamz" (video) – 3:34

UK 12-inch single

A1. "Sunshine" – 3:44
A2. "Sunshine" (instrumental) – 3:44
B1. "Overnight Celebrity" "Overnight Celebrity" (remix featuring Bump J and Cam'ron—explicit) – 3:29
B2. "Legit Ballers" – 5:18

== Charts ==
=== Weekly charts ===
Chart (2004)	Peak position
Australia (ARIA)	17
Australian Urban (ARIA)	4
Belgium (Ultratip Bubbling Under Flanders)	5
Europe (Eurochart Hot 100)	7
France (SNEP)	52
Germany (GfK)	58
Germany Black Chart (Official German Charts)	12
Ireland (IRMA)	10
Netherlands (Single Top 100)	93
New Zealand (Recorded Music NZ)	11
Scotland Singles (Official Charts)	8
Sweden (Sverigetopplistan)	27
UK Singles (Official Charts)	3
UK Hip Hop/R&B (Official Charts)	2

=== Year-end charts ===
Chart (2004)	Position
UK Singles (OCC)	57

== Certifications ==
Region	Certification	Certified units/sales
United Kingdom (BPI)	Silver	200,000^{‡}
^{‡} Sales+streaming figures based on certification alone.

== Release history ==
Region	Date	Format(s)	Label(s)	Ref.
Australia	August 2, 2004	CD	Atlantic	
United Kingdom	August 30, 2004	12-inch vinyl; CD	Atlantic	
