= After Taxes =

Studio album by Sheek Louch
- Released: November 8, 2005
- Recorded: 2004–2005
- Genre: Hip hop
- Length: 1:01:34
- Label: D-Block; Ruff Ryders; Czar; Koch
- Producer: Buckwild; DJ Cocoa Chanelle; DJ Twinz; Havoc; Mr. Devine; Red Spyda; Rockwilder; Supa Mario; Vinny Idol; The Alchemist

Sheek Louch chronology
Walk witt Me (2003)	After Taxes (2005)	Silverback Gorilla (2008)

Singles from After Taxes
- 1. "Kiss Your Ass Goodbye" Released: June 21, 2005; 2. "One Name" Released: 2005

Professional ratings
Review scores
Source	Rating
AllHipHop	4/5 stars
AllMusic	3.5/5 stars
HipHopDX	3/5
RapReviews	8/10

After Taxes is the second solo studio album by American rapper Sheek Louch. It was released on November 8, 2005, through Ruff Ryders/D-Block/Koch Records. Production was handled by Supa Mario, Vinny Idol, Red Spyda, Mr. Devine, Rockwilder, Buckwild, DJ Cocoa Chanelle, DJ Twinz, Havoc and The Alchemist. It features guest appearances from Jadakiss, Styles P, Beanie Sigel, Carl Thomas, Fabolous, Ghostface Killah, J-Hood and T.I.

The album peaked at number 23 on the Billboard 200, number 3 on the Top R&B/Hip-Hop Albums, number 2 on the Top Rap Albums and topped the Independent Albums charts in the United States. Its single "One Name" made it to No. 71 on the Hot R&B/Hip-Hop Songs and No. 70 on the R&B/Hip-Hop Airplay.

== Track listing ==
No.	Title	Writer(s)	Producer(s)	Length
1.	"Intro"	Sean Jacobs	Buckwild	1:52
2.	"Street Music"	Jacobs; Loren Lunnon	Mr. Devine	3:46
3.	"On the Road Again"	Jacobs; Mario Pizzini; Randy Ousley; Ray Middleton	Supa Mario; Vinny Idol	3:24
4.	"Pain" (featuring Jadakiss)	Jacobs; Jason Phillips; Dana Stinson	Rockwilder	3:46
5.	"45 Minutes to Broadway"	Jacobs; Kejuan Muchita	Havoc	3:34
6.	"One Name" (featuring Carl Thomas)	Jacobs; Carlton Thomas; Stinson	Rockwilder	3:21
7.	"Guess Who" (Interlude)			0:21
8.	"Maybe If I Sing" (50 Cent Diss)	Jacobs; Andy Thelusma	Red Spyda	3:40
9.	"Devine" (featuring J-Hood)	Jacobs; Joshua Hood; Lunnon	Mr. Devine	3:53
10.	"Kiss Your Ass Goodbye (Remix)" (featuring Fabolous, Beanie Sigel and T.I.)	Jacobs; John Jackson; Dwight Grant; Clifford Harris; Thelusma	Red Spyda	4:17
11.	"Do Not Interrupt" (Interlude)			0:58
12.	"Run Up" (featuring Styles P)	Jacobs; David Styles; Raymond Grant; Richard Grant; MD	DJ Twinz; M.D. (co.)	3:41
13.	"Get Up, Stand Up" (featuring Redman)	Jacobs; Reginald Noble; Pizzini; Ousley; Middleton	Supa Mario; Vinny Idol	4:23
14.	"Pressure"	Jacobs; Cynthia Watkins	DJ Cocoa Chanelle	4:15
15.	"Movie Niggas" (featuring Ghostface Killah)	Jacobs; Dennis Coles; Alan Maman	Alchemist	3:47
16.	"Juice Bar" (Interlude)			1:11
17.	"All Fed Up"	Jacobs; Pizzini; Ousley; Middleton	Supa Mario; Vinny Idol	3:28
18.	"Get Money" (featuring Jadakiss)	Jacobs; Phillips; Pizzini; Ousley; Middleton	Supa Mario; Vinny Idol	3:55
19.	"Kiss Your Ass Goodbye" (featuring Styles P)	Jacobs; Styles	Red Spyda	4:02
Total length:				1:01:34

== Charts ==
Chart (2005)	Peak position
US Billboard 200	23
US Top R&B/Hip-Hop Albums (Billboard)	3
US Top Rap Albums (Billboard)	2
US Independent Albums (Billboard)	1
