= Guerilla City =

Studio album by Guerilla Black
- Released: September 28, 2004
- Recorded: 2004
- Studio: SoundCastle (Los Angeles, CA); Danga Zone Studios (Miami Beach, FL); Big 3 Recording Studios (St. Petersburg, FL); Forster Bros. Entertainment (Los Angeles, CA); The Darkchild Grind Factory (Los Angeles, CA); Can-Am Recorders (Los Angeles, CA); Ardent Studios (Memphis, TN); Southgate Studios (Los Angeles, CA)
- Genre: West Coast hip hop; gangsta rap
- Length: 56:35
- Label: Virgin
- Producer: Carlos "6 July" Broady; Darkchild; DJ Felli Fel; Fredwreck; Gabriel René; Jazze Pha; Mario Winans; Red Spyda; Ric Rude; Roy "Royalty" Hamilton; Ski Beatz

Guerilla Black chronology
Guerilla City (2004)	God Bless The Child (2007)

Singles from Guerilla City
- 1. "Guerilla Nasty" Released: 2004; 2. "Compton" Released: 2004; 3. "You're the One" Released: 2004

Professional ratings
Review scores
Source	Rating
AllMusic	4/5 stars
RapReviews	7/10

Guerilla City is the debut studio album by American rapper Guerilla Black. It was released on September 28, 2004, via Virgin Records. Recording sessions took place at SoundCastle, Forster Bros. Entertainment, The Darkchild Grind Factory, Can-Am Recorders and Southgate Studios in Los Angeles, Danga Zone Studios in Miami Beach, Big 3 Recording Studios in St. Petersburg, and Ardent Studios in Memphis. Production was handled by Carlos "6 July" Broady, Jazze Pha, Darkchild, DJ Felli Fel, Fredwreck, Gabriel René, Mario Winans, Red Spyda, Ric Rude, Roy "Royalty" Hamilton and Ski Beatz. It features guest appearances from Beenie Man, Brooke Valentine, Hot Dollar, Jazze Pha, Mario Winans, Nate Dogg, Marion Remazeilles, Traci Nelson, Alex Thomas and Vonda Hope-Easton.

It debuted at number 20 on the US Billboard 200 and number 4 on the Top R&B/Hip-Hop Albums, selling 46,000 copies during its first week on sale, and had sold 200,000 copies as of January 2005.

The album spawned three singles: "Guerilla Nasty", "Compton" and "You're the One", with the latter reaching number 77 on the US Billboard Hot 100.

== Track listing ==
No.	Title	Writer(s)	Producer(s)	Length
1.	"Hearts of Fire"	Charles Williamson; Carlos Broady; Bob Marley	Carlos "Six July" Broady	5:33
2.	"Guerilla City"	Williamson; Andy Thelusma	Red Spyda	4:34
3.	"Compton" (featuring Beenie Man)	Williamson; Moses Davis; Broady; Winston Riley	Carlos "Six July" Broady	3:53
4.	"You're the One" (featuring Mario Winans)	Williamson; Mario Winans	Mario "Yellowman" Winans	3:38
5.	"The Strip Club (Skit)" (featuring Alex Thomas and Vonda Hope-Easton)		Alex Thomas; Guerilla Black; Hot Dollar; Pete "Volcano" Farmer; Til Welch	0:52
6.	"Trixxx"	Williamson; Rodney Jerkins; Ricky Lewis	Darkchild; Ric Rude	3:46
7.	"Guerilla Nasty" (featuring Jazze Pha and Brooke Valentine)	Williamson; Phalon Alexander	Jazze Pha	3:47
8.	"Sunrise"	Williamson; Roy Hamilton III; Roger Karshner; Chuck Mangione	Roy "Royalty" Hamilton	3:56
9.	"What We Gonna Do" (featuring Nate Dogg and Traci Nelson)	Williamson; Nathaniel Hale; Farid Nassar	Fredwreck	4:51
10.	"The Hotel (Skit)" (featuring Alex Thomas and Vonda Hope-Easton)		Alex Thomas; Guerilla Black; Hot Dollar; Pete "Volcano" Farmer; Til Welch	1:43
11.	"Say What"	Williamson; Leon Gray; Broady	Carlos "Six July" Broady	4:06
12.	"Yes Sir"	Williamson; Gabriel René	Gabriel René	3:37
13.	"It's All Right" (featuring Marion Remazeilles and Hot Dollar)	Williamson; Marion Remazeilles; Gray; James Corrine	DJ Felli Fel	3:26
14.	"Girlfriend"	Williamson; Alexander	Jazze Pha	4:43
15.	"My First"	Williamson; David Willis	Ski	4:10
Total length:				56:35

== Personnel ==
- Charles "Guerilla Black" Williamson – vocals, producer (tracks: 5, 10)
- Moses "Beenie Man" Davis – vocals (track 3)
- Mario "Yellowman" Winans – vocals & producer (track 4)
- Alex Thomas – vocals & producer (tracks: 5, 10)
- Vonda Hope-Easton – vocals (tracks: 5, 10)
- Kanesha Nichole "Brooke Valentine" Brookes – vocals (track 7)
- Phalon "Jazze Pha" Alexander – vocals (track 7), programming (track 14), producer (tracks: 7, 14)
- Nathaniel "Nate Dogg" Hale – vocals (track 9)
- Traci Nelson – additional vocals (track 9)
- Marion Remazeilles – additional vocals (track 13)
- Leon "Hot Dollar" Gray – additional vocals (tracks: 7, 13, 14), producer (tracks: 5, 10)
- Erick Coomes – guitar & bass (track 9)
- Farid "Fredwreck" Nassar – guitar, keyboards, producer & mixing (track 9)
- Carlos "Six July" Broady – producer (tracks: 1, 3, 11)
- Andy "Red Spyda" Thelusma – producer (track 2)
- Pete "Volcano" Farmer – producer (tracks: 5, 10), executive producer, A&R
- Til Welch – producer (tracks: 5, 10), A&R
- Rodney "Darkchild" Jerkins – producer (track 6)
- Ricky "Ric Rude" Lewis – producer (track 6)
- Roy "Royalty" Hamilton – programming & producer (track 8)
- Gabriel René – producer (track 12)
- James "DJ Felli Fel" Corrine – producer (track 13)
- David "Ski Beatz" Willis – producer (track 15)
- Curri Weber – recording (tracks: 1, 3), engineering assistant (track 11)
- Kevin Haywood – recording (track 11)
- Wassim Zreik – recording (track 14), engineering (track 7)
- Manny Marroquin – mixing (tracks: 1–3, 6, 11, 12)
- Jason Goldstein – mixing (track 4)
- Richard "Segal" Huredia – mixing (tracks: 5, 9, 10, 14)
- Jean-Marie Horvat – mixing (tracks: 8, 13, 15)
- Jeremy MacKenzie – engineering (tracks: 2, 8, 12, 15)
- Tommy Jamin – engineering (track 4)
- Gabriele Chiesa – engineering (track 6)
- Melvin Jackson – engineering (track 6)
- Christen Delano – additional engineering (track 3)
- Jimmy "Henchmen" Rosemond – executive producer, management
- Liza Lowinger – art coordinator
- Morning Breath Inc. – design
- Jonathan Mannion – photography
- Michelle Ryang – A&R
- Ronette Bowie – A&R
- Alan Mason – digital editing
- Jared Robbins – digital editing
- Sean Smith – creative director

== Charts ==
Chart (2004)	Peak position
US Billboard 200	20
US Top R&B/Hip-Hop Albums (Billboard)	4
US Top Rap Albums (Billboard)	3
