= Walk witt Me =

Studio album by Sheek Louch
- Released: September 16, 2003
- Recorded: 2002–03
- Studio: Liveson Studios (Yonkers, NY); Cocoa Studios (Queens, NY); D-Block Studios (Yonkers, NY); Green Lantern Studios (New York, NY)
- Genre: Hip-hop
- Length: 57:47
- Label: D-Block; Universal
- Producer: DJ Cocoa Chanelle; DJ Green Lantern; DJ Twinz; Liveson; Mr. Devine; Supa Mario; The Alchemist; Vinny Idol

Sheek Louch chronology
Walk witt Me (2003)	After Taxes (2005)

Singles from Walk witt Me
- 1. "OK" Released: June 24, 2003; 2. "Mighty D-Block (2 Guns Up)" Released: 2003

Professional ratings
Review scores
Source	Rating
AllMusic	3/5 stars
HipHopDX	4/5
RapReviews	6.5/10

Walk witt Me is the debut solo studio album by American rapper Sheek Louch. It was released on September 16, 2003, through D-Block Records and Universal Records. Recording sessions took place at Liveson Studios, Cocoa Studios, D-Block Studios and Green Lantern Studios in New York. Production was handled by Vinny Idol, Mr. Devine, Liveson, DJ Cocoa Chanelle, DJ Green Lantern, DJ Twinz, The Alchemist, and "Supa Mario" Pizzini, who also served as executive producer together with The Lox and Charles Suitt. It features guest appearances from Styles P, Jadakiss, J-Hood and Stephanie Lynn.

The album gained little mainstream recognition despite being on a major label. However, the album did manage to generate a buzz for the single "Mighty D-Block (2 Guns Up)", which samples some lyrics of the 50 Cent's song "Back Down".

== Critical reception ==
G. Hagan of HipHopDX praised the album, describing it as "one of those rugged albums to knock in your headphones during the winter time with your meanest screw face, your boots laced up, and your NorthFace bubble coat zipped all the way up". Steve Juon of RapReviews found "too many mediocre moments hold this album down". AllMusic's Jason Birchmeier concluded: "it doesn't have the big-budget fireworks that fellow LOX members Jadakiss and Styles P had on their debuts -- Kiss tha Game Goodbye (2001) and A Gangster and a Gentleman (2002), respectively -- yet it's an album that fans of the group should definitely hear despite its lack of commercial appeal".

== Commercial performance ==
The album was supported with two singles: "OK" and D-Block posse cut "Mighty D-Block (2 Guns Up)". Both of its singles didn't make it to the Billboard Hot 100. Its lead single "OK" reached number 92 on the Hot R&B/Hip-Hop Songs and number 40 on the Hot R&B/Hip-Hop Singles Sales. The second single off of the album, "Mighty D-Block (2 Guns Up)", peaked at number 65 on the Hot R&B/Hip-Hop Songs and number 63 on the R&B/Hip-Hop Airplay.

The album itself debuted at number 9 on the Billboard 200 and number 3 on the Top R&B/Hip-Hop Albums, selling 65,000 units in its first week of release in the United States.

== Track listing ==
No.	Title	Writer(s)	Producer(s)	Length
1.	"For You" (featuring Stephenie Lynn)	Sean Jacobs; Jared Liveson	Liveson	2:07
2.	"OK"	Jacobs; Cynthia Watkins	DJ Cocoa Chanelle	3:21
3.	"Turn It Up"	Jacobs; Alan Maman	Alchemist	4:24
4.	"How Many Guns"	Jacobs; Mario Pizzini; Randy Ousley; Ray Middleton	Supa Mario; Vinny Idol	3:37
5.	"In/Out (S.P.)" (featuring Styles P)	Jacobs; David Styles; Pizzini; Ousley; Middleton	Supa Mario; Vinny Idol	4:30
6.	"I Ain't Forget"	Jacobs; Pizzini; Ousley; Middleton	Supa Mario; Vinny Idol	4:18
7.	"Walk Witt Me" (featuring Stephenie Lynn)	Jacobs; Liveson	Liveson	4:15
8.	"Crazzy"	Jacobs; Loren Lunnon	Mr. Devine	4:13
9.	"Ten Hut" (featuring Jadakiss)	Jacobs; Jason Phillips; Pizzini; Ousley; Middleton	Supa Mario; Vinny Idol	2:36
10.	"How I Love You" (featuring Styles P)	Jacobs; Styles; Pizzini; Ousley; Middleton	Supa Mario; Vinny Idol	4:52
11.	"3-5-4 (Tarrentino)"	Jacobs; Lunnon	Mr. Devine	3:59
12.	"Don't Mean Nuthin'" (performed by The Lox & J-Hood)	Jacobs; Lunnon	Mr. Devine	5:03
13.	"D-Block" (featuring J-Hood)	Jacobs; Raymond Grant; Richard Grant	DJ Twinz	3:32
14.	"Mighty D-Block (2 Guns Up)" (performed by The Lox & J-Hood)	Jacobs; James D'Agostino	DJ Green Lantern	5:19
Total length:				57:47

== Charts ==
Chart (2003)	Peak position
US Billboard 200	9
US Top R&B/Hip-Hop Albums (Billboard)	3
