= Wu Block =

Studio album by Ghostface Killah and Sheek Louch
- Released: November 27, 2012
- Recorded: 2011–2012
- Genre: Hip-hop
- Length: 52:37
- Label: eOne
- Producers: Fithestate; John "Jmac" McCall; Phonix Beats; The Futuristics; Vinny Idol; Shroom; John Woo; Moose; Termanology; Odie Pecken; Frank Dukes; Red Spyda; V Don; Erick Sermon; Last Child; Joe Milly; Andrew Kelley

Ghostface Killah chronology
Apollo Kids (2010)	Wu Block (2012)	Twelve Reasons to Die (2013)

Sheek Louch chronology
Donnie G: Don Gorilla (2010)	Wu Block (2012)	Silverback Gorilla 2 (2015)

Singles from Wu Block
- 1. "Union Square" Released: June 29, 2012

Wu Block is a collaborative studio album by American rappers Ghostface Killah (of Wu-Tang Clan) and Sheek Louch (of The Lox). Louch announced the album in 2011, in an interview. The album was released on November 27, 2012, by eOne Music. The album features guest appearances from Raekwon, Jadakiss, Cappadonna, Method Man, Styles P, Masta Killa, GZA, Erykah Badu and Inspectah Deck.

== Background ==
In February 2011, Sheek Louch stated that he and Ghostface Killah were about 8 songs deep into the album. In July 2011, during an interview with DJ Semtex, Ghostface Killah said that the album would be released in February 2012. The album's first single "Union Square" was released on June 29, 2012. On August 20, 2012, it was announced that the album would be released on October 9, 2012.

On August 20, 2012, in a press release, Ghostface Killah spoke about the album, saying: "It’s real street shit for the fans. They’ve been thirstin’ for this." Sheek Louch also spoke about the album, saying: "Wu-Block mixes the rap style, lyrics, beats, imagery and ideology of the 9 member Wu-Tang clan with the flow, underground star power, hard hitting bars, street story telling and bass rattling sounds of D-Block." On October 5, 2012, the album cover was released, and it was announced that the album would be released on November 13, 2012. On October 29, 2012, the track listing was released, and it was announced that album would be released on November 27, 2012.

== Critical response ==
Professional ratings
Aggregate scores
Source	Rating
Metacritic	69/100
Review scores
Source	Rating
AllMusic	3.5/5 stars
Consequence of Sound	3/5 stars
HipHopDX	3.5/5 stars
The Independent	3/5 stars
NME	6/10
Pitchfork	6.5/10
PopMatters	7/10
RapReviews	6.5/10
Slant Magazine	2.5/5 stars
XXL	(L)

Wu Block was met with generally positive reviews from music critics. At Metacritic, which assigns a normalized rating out of 100 to reviews from mainstream critics, the album has received an average score of 69, based on 13 reviews, indicating "generally favorable reviews". The Company Man of HipHopDX gave the album three and a half stars out of five, saying "From mic to plug, Wu Block is a vintage Rap release only lacking in invention. Ghost and Sheek have made these songs repeatedly their entire career, only this time they created them together. And that’s all right. It’s hard to hate on pioneers for doing what they pioneered." Nick De Molina of XXL gave the album an L, saying "Wu-Block stays true to its roots and makes no compromises in pursuit of airplay." Matt Jost of RapReviews gave the album a 6.5 out of 10, saying "The co-headlining brings a certain focus to the project while the added features make it fully evident why these two posses, who as entities are arguably past their heyday, have remained on the scene." Dan Caffrey of Consequence of Sound gave the album three stars out of five, saying "The seasoned tone and familiar production lend Wu Block ease and listenability, but also result in empty posturing on tracks such as “Take Notice” and “Do It Like Us."

Jayson Greene of Pitchfork gave the album a 6.5 out of 10, saying "You don't tune into a D-Block and Ghostface Killah collaborative project expecting surprises, so here's the good news: There are absolutely none on Wu-Block." Jason Lymangrover of AllMusic gave the album three and a half stars, saying "Minus a few modern reference points, it's an album that's firmly rooted in the grimy, thuggish '90s, packed full of mafia don lyrics and endless references to jackin' marks, sportin' bling, and pushin' yeyo. Still, Shaolin and Yonkers camps wouldn't have it any other way." Al Horner of NME gave the album a six out of ten, saying "Whatever happened to the good old days, wonder Wu-Tang Clansman Ghostface Killah and D-Block’s Sheek Louch on their imaginatively titled collaboration. Like a rap Grindhouse, dripped in grimy nostalgia for a 1990s New York lived on ashen corners, the release turns the clock back in sound and spirit with the languorous productions of regular Ghostface collaborator The RZA replaced by hard beats and menacing samples."

== Commercial performance ==
The album debuted at number 73 on the Billboard 200, with first-week sales of 8,600 copies in the United States. It fell to number 152 in its second week selling 4,200 more copies.

== Track listing ==
No.	Title	Producer(s)	Length
1.	"Crack Spot Stories" (featuring Raekwon & Jadakiss)	Fithestate	3:23
2.	"Pour Tha Martini" (featuring Cappadonna)	John "Jmac" McCall	3:09
3.	"Pull Tha Cars Out" (featuring Method Man)	Phonix Beats; The Futuristics	3:13
4.	"Guns For Life" (featuring Styles P)	Fithestate	3:23
5.	"Comin' For Ya Head" (featuring Styles P & Raekwon)	Vinny Idol	4:25
6.	"Cocaine Central" (featuring Styles P)	Shroom	3:36
7.	"Take Notice"	Jon Woo	3:20
8.	"Drivin' Round" (featuring Masta Killa, GZA & Erykah Badu)	Moose; Termanology; Odie Peken	4:09
9.	"Different Time Zones" (featuring Inspectah Deck)	Frank Dukes	3:00
10.	"Stick Up Kids" (featuring Jadakiss)	Red Spyda	3:00
11.	"All In Together" (featuring Styles P & Jadakiss)	V Don	4:55
12.	"Do It Like Us" (featuring Raekwon)	Erick Sermon	3:24
13.	"Stella" (featuring Method Man)	Last Child	3:31
14.	"Been Robbed"	Joe Milly	2:50
15.	"Bust Shots" (featuring Inspectah Deck)	Frank Dukes	3:21

Deluxe Edition
No.	Title	Producer(s)	Length
16.	"Bust Shots (Andrew Kelley Remix)" (featuring Inspectah Deck)	Andrew Kelley	3:38

Notes

- Ghostface Killah does not appear on "Drivin' Round".
