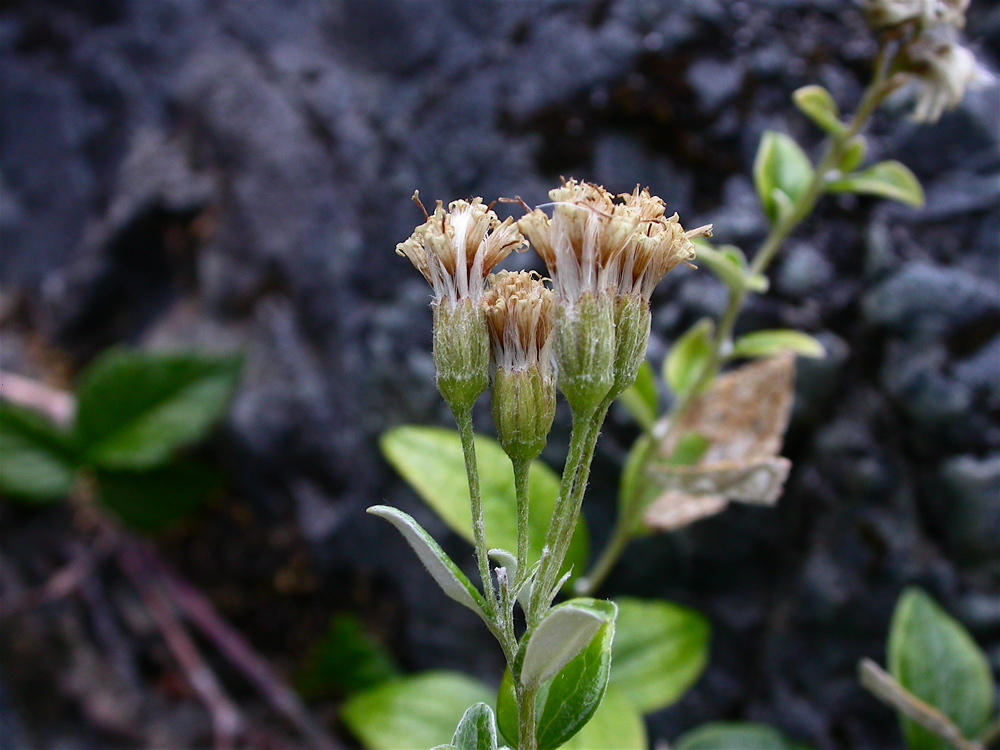
- Luina hypoleuca

Scientific classification
- Kingdom: Plantae
- Clade: Tracheophytes
- Clade: Angiosperms
- Clade: Eudicots
- Clade: Asterids
- Order: Asterales
- Family: Asteraceae
- Subfamily: Asteroideae
- Tribe: Senecioneae
- Genus: Luina; Benth., (1873)

Type species
- Luina hypoleuca Benth., (1873)

= Luina =

Genus of shrubs

Luina, commonly called silverback, is a small genus of perennial shrubs in the groundsel tribe within the sunflower family.

== Description ==
These are large, bushy perennials, native to the Pacific Coast of North America (United States and Canada), growing on rock outcrops, cliffs, and talus slopes.

Their slender stems are covered with a gray, thick felt. They grow from a stout, branching, woody base, growing into clumps several meters across.

The leaves have an alternate arrangement, The leaf shape is lanceolate to ovate. The leaf margins are entire or dentate. The leaves are sessile in L. hypoleuca, but petiolate in L. serpentina. The leaves are glabrous above, but underneath thick with white hairs, giving it a silvery appearance.

At the end of each stem there is an inflorescence with generally 4–12, flat-topped clustered flower heads. These are discoid, i.e. they contain only disc flowers and lack ray flowers. The bracts under the flower head occur in 1–2 equal series. The receptacle is flat or convex. There are generally 11–23 bright yellow disc flowers, with a slightly expanded throat.

The glabrous or strigose fruit is 3–4 millimetres (1/8–3/16 inch) long. The pappus shows many bristles and is 8–10 mm (5/16–3/8 in) long.

== Taxonomy ==
Species

- Luina hypoleuca Benth. : silverback luina, littleleaf luina - British Columbia, Washington, Oregon, California (Lake Co to Del Norte Co)
  - Luina hypoleuca var. californica A.Gray
  - Luina hypoleuca var. dentata L.F.Hend.
  - Luina hypoleuca var. hypoleuca
- Luina serpentina Cronquist : colonial luina, creeping silverback - Grant County in Oregon

Formerly included

See Cacaliopsis, Rainiera, Prenanthes

- Luina nardosmia (A.Gray) Cronquist - Cacaliopsis nardosmia (A.Gray) A.Gray
- Luina stricta (Greene) B.L.Rob. - Rainiera stricta Greene

=== Etymology ===
The name of this genus is an anagram of the name of the flower genus Inula.
