= DJ Cocoa Chanelle =

American rapper and DJ

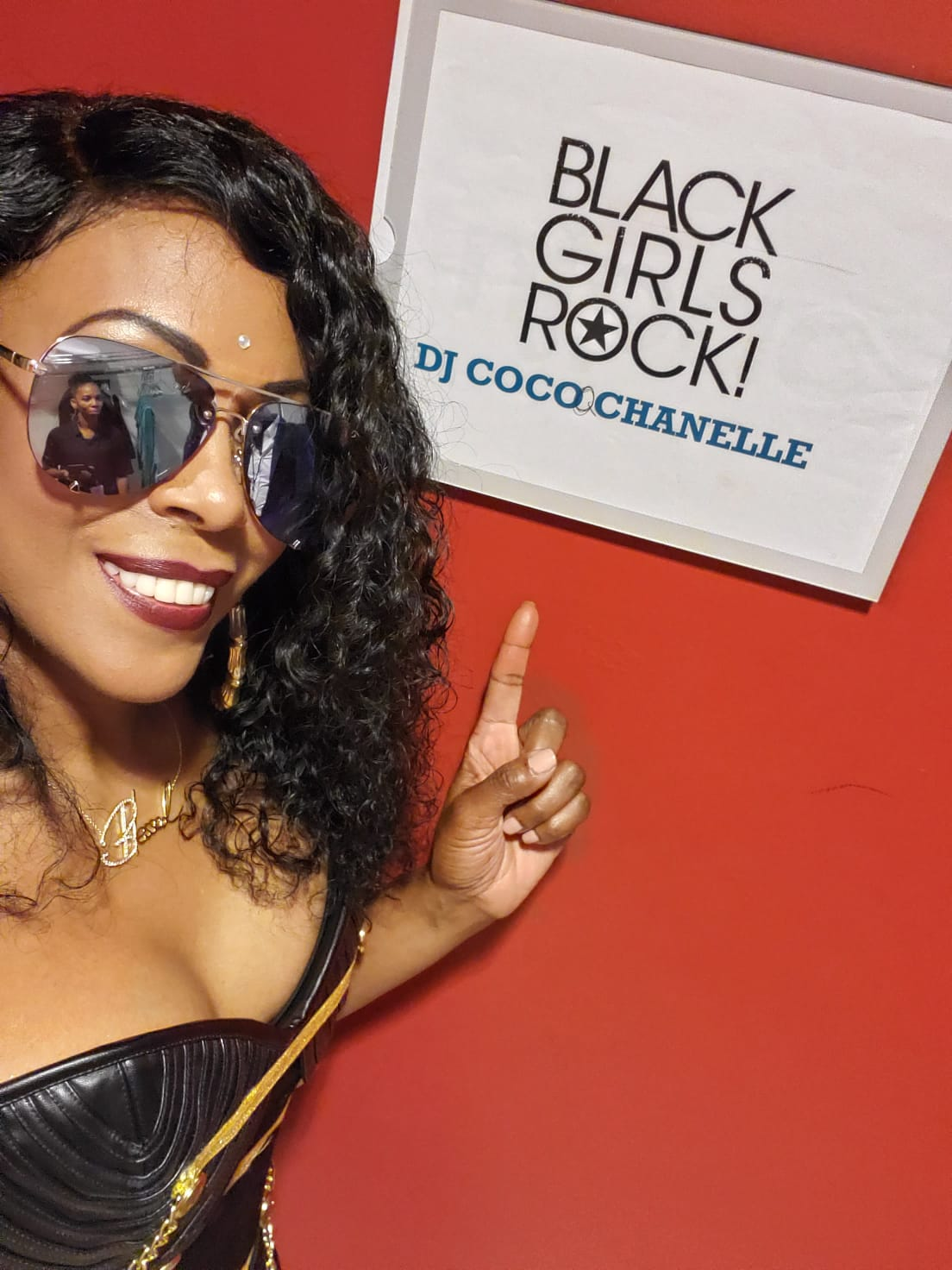
- Chanelle backstage at BET Networks Black Girls Rock

Background information
- Also known as: The Best Kept Secret
- Born: Brooklyn, New York, United States
- Origin: New York City
- Genres: Hip hop, R&B, reggae, House music
- Occupations: DJ, rapper, musician
- Instruments: Turntable, sampler
- Label: 5th House Entertainment
- Website: www.iamcocoa.com

Cocoa Chanelle is an American DJ, recording artist and radio DJ/host currently broadcasting on Audacy's 94.7 in New York City. She has worked as an on-air personality and mix show DJ on New York City's Hip Hop radio station HOT 97 and Kiss FM. She has worked in television, being the first DJ to be employed by BET Networks for the weekly teen talk show "Teen Summit."

== Early life ==
Chanelle was born in Brooklyn, New York. At age seven, she was raised by her grandmother in West Virginia following the death of both parents due to alcoholism. She started as a MC at the age of twelve, and was later put on the turntables by age thirteen by her brother Andre who was shot and killed in New Jersey three months before Cocoa was hired as a DJ on HOT 97.

== Career ==
At a young age, Cocoa entered local talent shows rapping and DJing. By age 16, while visiting family, Cocoa was asked by Houston, Texas DJ Walter D to make a guest DJ appearance on the popular radio station Magic 102. Immediately following high school graduation, Cocoa began her DJ career on a professional level in her hometown New York City as the DJ for hip-hop duo Kings of Swing. Her big break came when she landed a weekly spot on BET's teen talk show Teen Summit as the first-ever BET resident DJ, a spot she held for over six years. She has also worked on MTV's Spring Break. and made several guest appearances on BET's Rap City and 106 & Park.

She had a 16-year radio career in New York City on HOT 97 which began after making several guests mixing appearances on Hot 97's "Morning Show", hosted by Ed Lover, she was recommended to the stations program director and as a result, the morning show producer created the idea for "Ladies Night," which consisted of Angie Martinez, DJ Jazzy Joyce & Chanelle.

She was also listed in Vibe Magazine as one of the TOP 17 DJ's in the United States, honored by BET for Black History Month and received a Black Girls Rock! award. Aside from DJing in nightclubs around the world, Cocoa has performed at Madison Square Garden as the DJ for the New York Knicks half time show. She was also honored at the industry event for Radio Mixshow DJ's Mixshow Power Summit conference, where she received the award for "Best Female Mixshow DJ of the Year."

In 2019, Cocoa became the official touring DJ for the female rap group Salt N Pepa.

== Discography ==
=== Production ===
- 2003: "Ok" – Sheek Louch
- 2005: "Pressure" – Sheek Louch
- 2006: "Pain in My Life" – Saigon

=== Studio album ===
With Kings of Swing

- 1990 Strategy (Virgin, 1990)
