= Life on D-Block =

Studio album by Sheek Louch
- Released: May 19, 2009
- Recorded: 2008–2009
- Genre: Hip hop
- Length: 43:46
- Label: Real Talk
- Producer: Big Hollis; Cozmo

Sheek Louch chronology
Silverback Gorilla (2008)	Life on D-Block (2009)	Donnie G: Don Gorilla (2010)

Singles from Life on D-Block
- 1. "Time 2 Get Paid" Released: 2009

Professional ratings
Review scores
Source	Rating
AllMusic	3.5/5 stars
RapReviews	7.5/10

Life on D-Block is the fourth solo studio album by American rapper Sheek Louch. It was released on May 19, 2009, via Real Talk Entertainment. Production was handled by Cozmo and Big Hollis. The album debuted at number 122 on the Billboard 200 chart, selling 4,300 copies in its first week.

== Track listing ==
No.	Title	Producer(s)	Length
1.	"Let's Go"	Hollis	1:21
2.	"It's On" (featuring Bully)	Cozmo	3:54
3.	"Life on D-Block"	Cozmo	3:27
4.	"The Take Off"	Real Talk Ent.	0:54
5.	"Give That Up"	Cozmo	3:31
6.	"Time 2 Get Paid"	Cozmo	2:57
7.	"Come Up"	Real Talk Ent.	0:30
8.	"Pimp Shit" (featuring Bully)	Cozmo	4:49
9.	"That Nigga"	Cozmo	3:27
10.	"In the Rain"	Cozmo, Maxwell Smart	3:15
11.	"The Boyz from NY"	Cozmo	3:30
12.	"My Guns Go"	Cozmo	4:14
13.	"Not Livin It"	Cozmo	3:18
14.	"Die Slow"	Hollis	1:04
15.	"Time 2 Get Paid" (Edited Version)	Cozmo	3:28
Total length:			43:46

Digital bonus tracks
No.	Title	Length
16.	"Boy Meets Girl" (featuring AZ)	4:10
17.	"What Up" (featuring AZ & Hell Rell)	4:23

== Charts ==
Chart (2009)	Peak position
US Billboard 200	122
US Top R&B/Hip-Hop Albums (Billboard)	26
US Top Rap Albums (Billboard)	13
US Independent Albums (Billboard)	17
