= Donnie G: Don Gorilla =

Studio album by Sheek Louch
- Released: December 14, 2010
- Recorded: 2009–10
- Genre: Hip hop
- Length: 45:50
- Label: D-Block; Def Jam
- Producer: Bangladesh; Big H; DJ Webstar; Don Cannon; J. Cardim; Nemis; Phonix Beats; Pree-Recorded; Red Spyda; Statik Selektah; Team Ready; The Futuristiks; Y-Not; Kool Aid

Sheek Louch chronology
| Life on D-Block (2009) | Donnie G: Don Gorilla (2010) | Wu Block (2012) |

Professional ratings
Review scores
| Source | Rating |
|---|---|
| AllMusic | 4/5 stars |
| HipHopDX | 2.5/5 |
| Pitchfork | 5.3/10 |
| RapReviews | 5.5/10 |

Donnie G: Don Gorilla is the fifth solo album by the American rapper Sheek Louch. It was released on December 14, 2010, via D-Block Records and Def Jam Recordings. Production was handled by Red Spyda, Y-Not, Bangladesh, Big H, Darius "Phonix" Barnes, DJ Webstar, Don Cannon, J. Cardim, Mike & Keys, Nemis, Pree-Recorded, Statik Selektah, Team Ready and Kool Aid. It features guest appearances from Bun B, Casely, DJ Webstar, Fabolous, Jadakiss, Jeremih, Kevin Cossom, Kobe, Styles P and The Bully.

The album made it to number 43 on the Top R&B/Hip-Hop Albums and number 17 on the Top Rap Albums charts in the United States.

A music video was directed for the song "Party After 2".

== Track listing ==
| No. | Title | Writer(s) | Producer(s) | Length |
|---|---|---|---|---|
| 1. | "Rhyme Animal" (Intro) | Sean Jacobs; Hassan Greely; Carlton Ridenhour; James Boxley; Eric Sadler; Hank Shocklee | Big H | 1:28 |
| 2. | "Get It Poppin'" | Jacobs; John Wesley-Groover; Michael Cox; Yaasiel Davis | The Futuristiks; Team Ready | 3:04 |
| 3. | "Club Jam Packed" (featuring DJ Webstar) | Jacobs; Desmond Ryan; Henry Kaprali | DJ Webstar | 3:34 |
| 4. | "Out of the Ghetto" (featuring Kobe Honeycutt) | Jacobs; Brian Honeycutt; Donald Cannon; Khalil Abdul-Rahman | Don Cannon | 3:26 |
| 5. | "Make Some Noise" (featuring Fabolous) | Jacobs; John Jackson; Andy Thelusma | Red Spyda; Pree-Recorded | 4:05 |
| 6. | "Blood & Tears" (featuring Casely) | Jacobs; Jean-Carlos Casely; Devin Parker; Alonzo Jackson | Nemis | 3:48 |
| 7. | "Nite Falls" | Jacobs; Patrick Baril; Anthony Carey | Statik Selektah | 2:57 |
| 8. | "Party After 2" (featuring Jeremih) | Jacobs; Jeremy Felton; Darius Barnes | Phonix Beats | 4:09 |
| 9. | "Ol' Skool" (featuring Bun B) | Jacobs; Bernard Freeman; Jonas Cardim; Senecca Fortune; Jason Vanterpool | J. Cardim | 3:42 |
| 10. | "Picture Phone Foreplay" (featuring Kevin Cossom) | Jacobs; Kevin Cossom; Shondrae Crawford | Bangladesh | 3:38 |
| 11. | "Dinner Guest" (featuring Jadakiss, The Bully and Styles P) | Jacobs; Jason Phillips; Donnelle Little; David Styles; Thelusma; Michael Rose | Red Spyda | 4:51 |
| 12. | "Ready 4 War" | Jacobs; Keith Fogah | Y-Not | 3:22 |

Donnie G: Don Gorilla — iTunes Store bonus tracks
| No. | Title | Writer(s) | Producer(s) | Length |
|---|---|---|---|---|
| 13. | "Clip Up (Reloaded)" (featuring Styles P and Jadakiss) | Jacobs; Styles; Fogah | Y-Not; Kool Aid | 3:46 |
| 14. | "Cocaine Trafficking" (featuring Jadakiss and Styles P) | Jacobs; Phillips; James D'Agostino | DJ Green Lantern | 3:47 |

Sample credits

- "Rhyme Animal (Intro)" contains a sample of "Don't Believe the Hype", written by Carlton Ridenhour, James Boxley, Eric Sadler, and Hank Shocklee; and performed by Public Enemy.
- "Nite Falls" contains samples of "Armageddon", written by Anthony Carey, and performed by Planet P Project.
- "Dinner Guest" contains interpolations of "Guess Who's Coming to Dinner", written by Michael Rose.

== Personnel ==
- Sean "Sheek Louch" Jacobs – vocals, executive producer
- Troy Desmond "DJ Webstar" Ryan – vocals & producer (track 3)
- Brian "Kobe" Honeycutt – vocals (track 4)
- John "Fabolous" Jackson – vocals (track 5)
- Jean-Carlos Casely – vocals (track 6)
- Jeremy "Jeremih" Felton – vocals (track 8)
- Bernard "Bun B" Freeman – vocals (track 9)
- Kevin Cossom – vocals (track 10)
- David "Styles P" Styles – vocals (tracks: 11, 13)
- Jason "Jadakiss" Phillips – vocals (tracks: 11, 14)
- Donnelle "Bully" Little – vocals (track 11)
- Hassan "Big H" Greely – producer (track 1)
- Michael Ray "Money Mike" Cox, Jr. – producer (track 2)
- John "J-Keys" Groover – producer (track 2)
- Yaasiel Davis – producer (track 2)
- Don Cannon – producer (track 4)
- Andy "Red Spyda" Thelusma – producer (tracks: 5, 11)
- Pree-Recorded – producer (track 5)
- Nemis – producer (track 6)
- Patrick "Statik Selektah" Baril – producer (track 7)
- Darius "Phonix Beats" Barnes – producer (track 8)
- Jonas Cardim – producer (track 9)
- Shondrae "Bangladesh" Crawford – producer (track 10)
- Keith "Y-Not" Fogah – producer (tracks: 12, 13)
- Kool Aid – producer (track 13)
- James "DJ Green Lantern" D'Agostino – producer (track 14)
- Jesus "Poobs" Fernandez – recording
- Dragan Čačinović – mixing
- Tony Dawsey – mastering
- Antonio "L.A." Reid – executive producer
- Mike Caruso – executive producer
- Dawud West – art direction, design
- Pablo Cubarie – artwork
- Armen Djerrahian – photography
- Javon Greene – A&R
- Leesa D. Brunson – A&R
- Lenny Santiago – A&R
- Lamonte Quarles – management
- James Looby – management

== Charts ==
| Chart (2010) | Peak position |
|---|---|
| US Top R&B/Hip-Hop Albums (Billboard) | 43 |
| US Top Rap Albums (Billboard) | 17 |
