= So Sexy Chapter II (Like This) =

Single by Twista featuring R. Kelly

from the album Kamikaze
- B-side: "Y'all Know Who"
- Released: September 20, 2004
- Genre: Hip hop
- Length: 4:03
- Label: Atlantic
- Songwriters: Carl Mitchell, Robert Kelly
- Producer: R. Kelly

Twista singles chronology
"Sunshine" (2004)	"So Sexy Chapter II (Like This)" (2004)	"Let's Go" (2004)

R. Kelly singles chronology
"So Sexy" (2004)	"So Sexy Chapter II (Like This)" (2004)	"Wonderful" (2004)

"So Sexy Chapter II (Like This)" is a single by Twista featuring R. Kelly, and a sequel to their previous hit single, "So Sexy". The song did not appear on the original release of Twista's album Kamikaze, but was later included on the re-release as one of two new bonus tracks. While not as successful as the original, "So Sexy Chapter II" made it onto two Billboard charts in the US, peaking at 92 on the Billboard 200 and 47 on the Hot R&B/Hip-Hop Singles & Tracks.

== Single track listing ==
1. "So Sexy Chapter II (Like This)" – 4:03
2. "So Sexy Chapter II (Like This)" (Amended) – 4:03
3. "So Sexy Chapter II (Like This)" (Instrumental) – 4:03
4. "Y'all Know Who" (Explicit) – 3:48
5. "Y'all Know Who" (Amended) – 3:44
6. "Y'all Know Who" (Instrumental) – 3:45

== Charts ==
=== Weekly charts ===
Chart	Position
Billboard Hot 100	92
US Hot R&B/Hip-Hop Songs	47
UK Singles Chart	28

== Release history ==
Region	Date	Format(s)	Label(s)	Ref.
United States	September 20, 2004	Rhythmic contemporary; urban contemporary radio	Atlantic	
