= 50 Cent: The New Breed =

- Directed by: Don Robinson; Damon Johnson
- Produced by: Don Robinson; Damon Johnson
- Starring: 50 Cent; Eminem; Dr. Dre; Lloyd Banks; Tony Yayo
- Music by: 50 Cent
- Distributed by: Interscope Records
- Release date: April 15, 2003 (U.S.)
- Language: English

50 Cent: The New Breed is a 2003 documentary and video album by rapper 50 Cent directed by Don Robinson and Damon Johnson. It was distributed by Interscope Records and released in the United States on April 15, 2003.

== Background ==
50 Cent: The New Breed stars 50 Cent, Eminem, Dr. Dre, Lloyd Banks, Tony Yayo, Obie Trice, D12 and others, distributed by Interscope Records. 50 Cent: The New Breed is directed and produced by Don Robinson and Damon Johnson.

The DVD documents the making of the songs and albums by 50 Cent, especially his Get Rich or Die Tryin' album released that year. Some of the footage featured on The New Breed is from the Get Rich or Die Tryin' documentary that was in the limited release of his first album. The DVD charted at number two in the US and sold over 645,000 units as of December 2003.

== Contents ==
=== DVD ===
1. The Documentary

- 50 Cent: The New Breed
- Tony Yayo: The Interview

2. The Music Videos

- "Heat"
- "Wanksta": Behind the Scenes
- "Wanksta"
- "In da Club": Behind the Scenes
- "In da Club"
- "Heat": The Street Version

3. Live in Detroit

- "U Not Like Me"
- "Wanksta"
- "Patiently Waiting" (featuring Eminem)
- "Love Me" (featuring Eminem and Obie Trice)
- "Rap Game" (featuring D12)
- "In da Club"
- The Detroit Show: Behind the Scenes

4. Bonus Material

- "Wanksta" (Sessions @ AOL)
- "In da Club" (Sessions @ AOL)
- "Round Here" (Sessions @ AOL)
- 8 Mile DVD trailer

=== Bonus CD ===
01. True Loyalty (featuring Lloyd Banks and Tony Yayo) (Produced By Red Spyda)

02. 8 Mile Road (G-Unit Remix) (featuring 50 Cent, Lloyd Banks and Tony Yayo) (Produced By Eminem; Additional Production By Luis Resto)

03. In Da Hood (featuring Brooklyn) (Produced By Dr. Dre and Scott Storch)

== Chart performance ==
=== Year-end charts ===
Chart (2003)	Position
US Billboard 200	118
