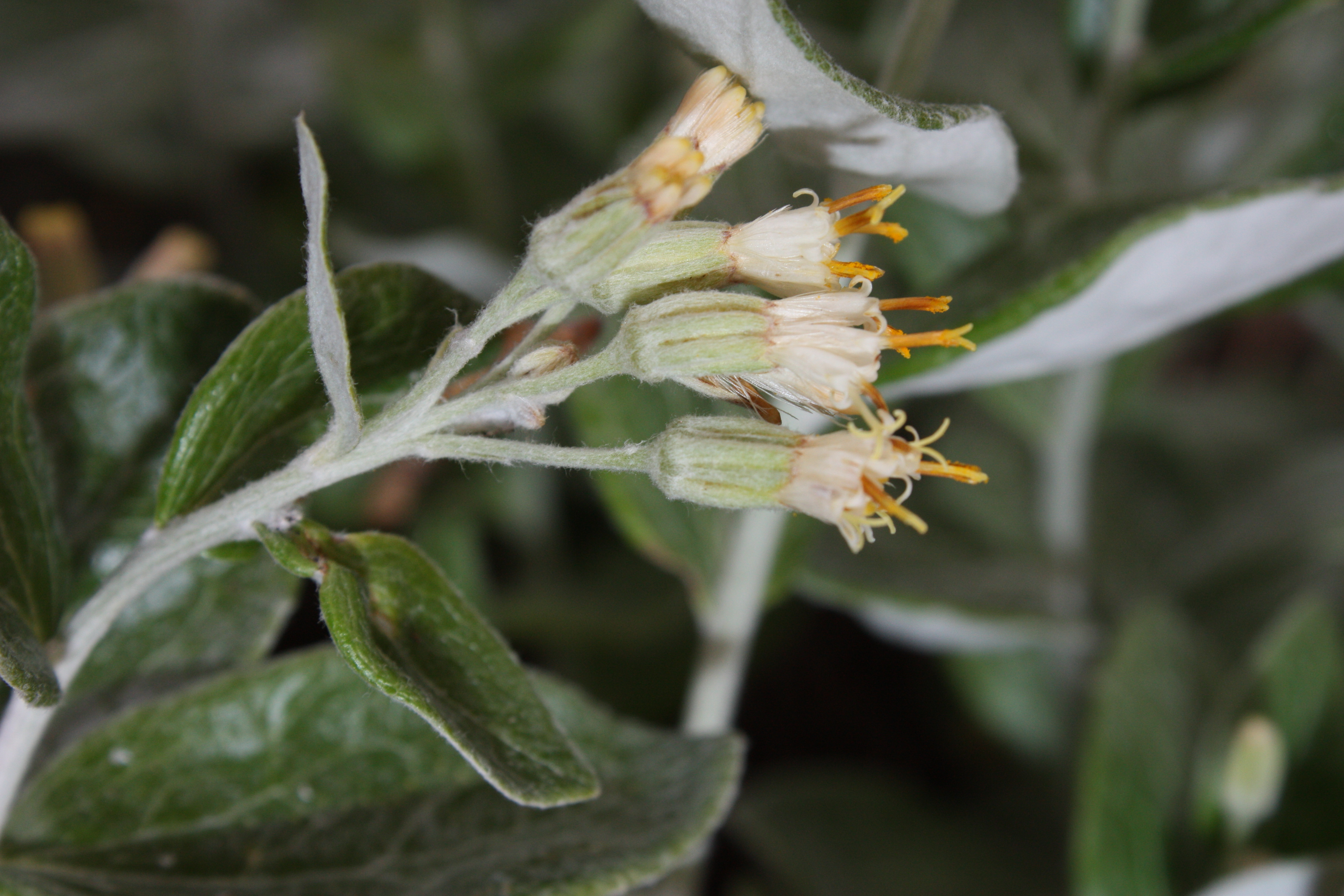
- Luina hypoleuca in Mount Rainier National Park

Scientific classification
- Kingdom: Plantae
- Clade: Tracheophytes
- Clade: Angiosperms
- Clade: Eudicots
- Clade: Asterids
- Order: Asterales
- Family: Asteraceae
- Genus: Luina
- Species: L. hypoleuca

Binomial name
- Luina hypoleuca Benth.

= Luina hypoleuca =

Species of flowering plant

Luina hypoleuca, the littleleaf silverback, is a species of the genus Luina and the family Asteraceae. It grows to 40 centimetres (16 inches) in height, its leaves 2.5–6.5 cm (1–2 1/2 in) long and white on the underside (hence the specific epithet, meaning 'bottom white'). It flowers between June and October, with yellowish rayless flower heads about 9 millimetres (3/8 in) long. It is found in North America on open and usually rocky places between elevations of 70–2,100 metres (230–6,890 feet) in British Columbia, California, Oregon, and Washington.

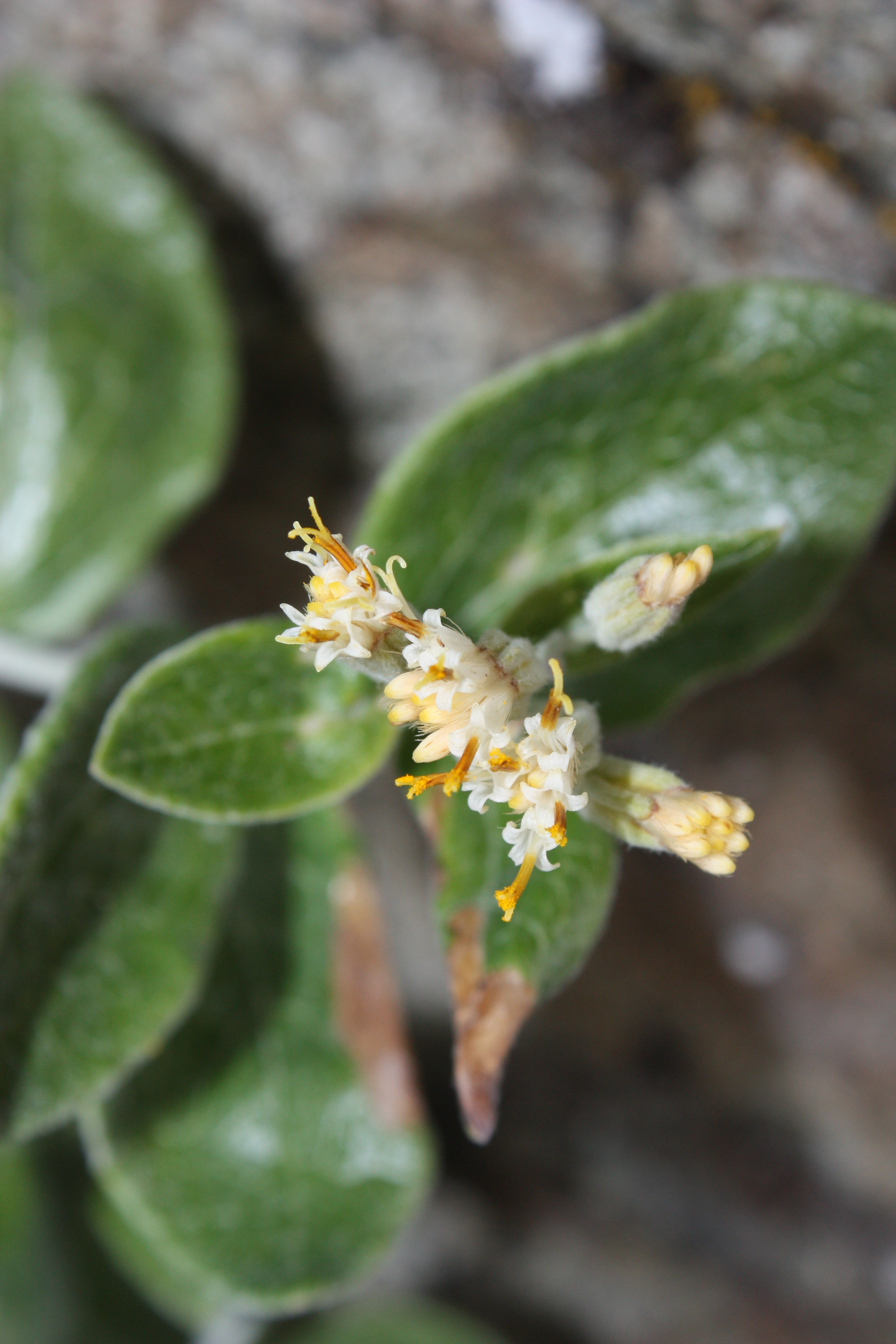
Top view

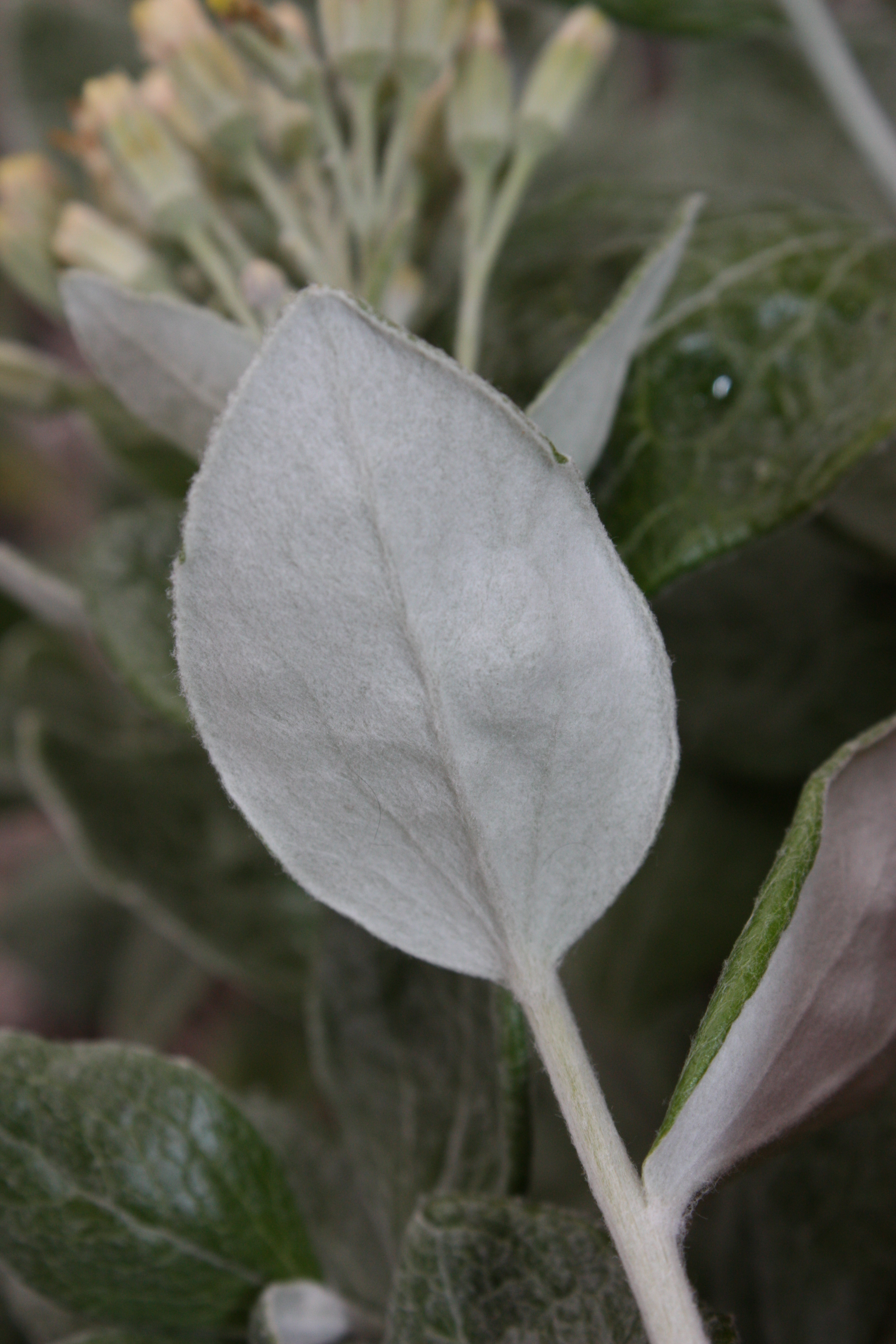
Leaf bottom
