= So Sexy =

Single by Twista featuring R. Kelly

from the album Kamikaze
- Released: June 14, 2004
- Recorded: 2003
- Genre: Hip-hop; R&B
- Length: 3:51
- Label: Roc-A-Fella; Atlantic
- Songwriters: Carl Mitchell; Robert Kelly
- Producer: R. Kelly

Twista singles chronology
"Overnight Celebrity" (2004)	"So Sexy" (2004)	"Sunshine" (2004)

R. Kelly singles chronology
"Happy People" (2004)	"So Sexy" (2004)	"So Sexy Chapter II (Like This)" (2004)

"So Sexy" is a song by American rapper Twista featuring vocals and sole production from American singer R. Kelly. Released as the third single from the former's fourth studio album, Kamikaze (2004), it was Twista's third straight top 40 hit from the album, having peaked at number 25 on the Billboard Hot 100. "So Sexy" was followed by "So Sexy: Chapter II (Like This)" which also made it to the Billboard charts.

== Track listing ==
1. "So Sexy" (explicit album version) – 3:51
2. "So Sexy: Chapter II (Like This)" (explicit album version) – 4:03
3. "So Sexy" (a capella) – 2:57
4. "So Sexy" (instrumental) – 2:57
5. "So Sexy: Chapter II (Like This)" (instrumental) – 4:03

== Charts ==
Chart	Position
Australia (ARIA)	43
UK Singles (OCC)	28
US Billboard Hot 100	25
US Hot R&B/Hip-Hop Songs (Billboard)	10
US Hot Rap Songs (Billboard)	7
US Rhythmic Airplay (Billboard)	19

== Release history ==
Region	Date	Format(s)	Label(s)	Ref.
United States	June 14, 2004	Rhythmic contemporary; urban contemporary radio	Atlantic	
