= Guerilla Black =

American rapper

- Born: Charles Williamson; 1977 (age 48–49); Chicago, Illinois, U.S.
- Origin: Compton, California, U.S.
- Genres: West Coast hip hop
- Occupations: Rapper; songwriter
- Years active: 1999 - present
- Labels: Virgin; EMI Records

Charles Williamson (born 1977), better known by his stage name Guerilla Black, is an American rapper from Compton, California. Born in Chicago, Illinois, he came to fame after releasing his debut album Guerilla City (2004), which featured the singles "Compton" featuring Beenie Man and "You're The One" featuring Mario Winans. Williamson released a track titled "400 Shotz, the Funeral" taking aim at The Game, Jermaine Dupri and Daz Dillinger. His latest mixtape, "The Black Tapes" was released in 2009. It is notable for Williamson's change in rapping style, a change he acknowledges on several tracks. Featured artists on the Mixtape included Hot Dollar, T-Pain, and Akon.

He has been both criticized and praised for having a similar voice and delivery to The Notorious B.I.G. and even pays homage to Biggie on his "Real Niggaz Say Real Shit" mixtape, on the track "Letter to B.I.G." Williamson also bears a resemblance to Biggie.

He is the brother of rapper Hot Dollar, and both rappers are part of the Dolla Figga hip-hop collective.

Williamson has also contributed both his music and performed voice work of the character Dupree in the video game 187 Ride or Die.

== Discography ==
=== Albums ===
- 2004: Guerilla City
- 2007: God Bless the Child

=== Mixtapes ===
- 1999: N.O.T.O.R.I.O.U.S. B.L.A.C.K.
- 2002: No Draws
- 2004: Black by Popular Demand
- 2007: Real Niggaz Say Real Shit (Vol. 1)
- 2009: The Blacktapes

=== Singles ===
List of singles, with selected chart positions, showing year released and album name
Title	Year	Peak chart positions				Album
Title	Year	US	US R&B	US Rap	US Rhyth.	Album
"Guerilla Nasty" (featuring Jazze Pha and Brooke Valentine)	2004	—	79	—	—	Guerilla City
"Compton" (featuring Beenie Man)	2004	— (Note: "Compton" did not enter the Billboard Hot 100, but peaked at number three on the Bubbling Under Hot 100 Singles chart.)	30	22	38	Guerilla City
"You're the One" (featuring Mario Winans)	2005	77	43	24	23	Guerilla City
"Whatever" (featuring Hot Dollar)	2006	—	—	—	—	God Bless the Child
"—" denotes a recording that did not chart.

== Guest appearances ==
List of non-single guest appearances, with other performing artists, showing year released and album name
Title	Year	Other artist(s)	Album
"West Coast"	2012	Shorty Mack	—N/a
