= Kamikaze (Twista album) =

Studio album by Twista
- Released: January 27, 2004
- Genres: Hip-hop; R&B
- Length: 65:55
- Label: Atlantic
- Producers: Kanye West; Jazze Pha; The Legendary Traxster; R. Kelly; Toxic; Red Spyda; D-Roy & Mr. B; Mike Caren

Twista chronology
Mobstability (1998)	Kamikaze (2004)	The Day After (2005)

Singles from Kamikaze
- 1. "Slow Jamz" Released: November 10, 2003; 2. "Overnight Celebrity" Released: March 8, 2004; 3. "So Sexy" Released: June 14, 2004; 4. "Sunshine" Released: August 2, 2004; 5. "So Sexy: Chapter II (Like This)" Released: September 20, 2004

Kamikaze is the third studio album by American rapper Twista. It was released on January 27, 2004, by Atlantic Records. The album reached the top of the US Billboard 200 chart in early 2004, after the success of its lead single, "Slow Jamz". It sold 312,000 units in its first week of sales, and received generally positive reviews from critics. It is Twista's most successful album, being certified double platinum by the RIAA.

== Background ==
On his website, Twista stated that he made Kamikaze to show that he was still true to the ideals that he had when he started out. "I represent for the MCs that have skills, not just make music for the hell of it. I take the time to concentrate. Otherwise, I could have 10 albums out there, easy. I could sit down all day and write something. But I write when I get in a zone more than writing because I’ve got to do this. I represent the artists that keep it true to what really is, to be able to make rappers want to write."

"I want to show the streets that I'm back and that I'm true to the game. Musically, I want to show that I'm still out here doing my thing. After all the people that were out when I was out years ago fell off, I’m still out here competing with the shorties. I also want to gain platinum success. It's something that I haven't done."

The song "Sunshine" contains the backing track from Lovely Day by Bill Withers.

The song "Overnight Celebrity" contains a sample of the Lenny Williams' 1978 song "Cause I Love You".

== Critical reception ==
Professional ratings
Aggregate scores
Source	Rating
Metacritic	66/100
Review scores
Source	Rating
Allmusic	3/5 stars
Blender	3/5 stars
Robert Christgau	(choice cut)
HipHopDX	4/5 stars
Pitchfork Media	(6.4/10)
PopMatters	8/10 stars
RapReviews	(8.5/10)
Rolling Stone	2/5 stars
USA Today	3/4 stars
Vibe	3.5/5 stars

The album has a score of 66 out of 100 based on "generally positive reviews". The A.V. Club gave it a favorable review and stated that the album "feels eclectic without stooping to demographics-pandering, though its contradictory elements create a few jarring moments." E! Online gave it a B and said, "Twista still manages to steal the limelight on hot booty-busters like 'Slow Jamz' and 'Pimp On.'" Yahoo! Music UK gave it seven stars out of ten and called it "overlong, like almost every rap album today, and it's not the sort of place to come expecting erudition or insight. But for one singular rapper unwilling and unafraid to stick to his guns, it's a deeply satisfying record." Other reviews are pretty average or mixed: Q gave it three stars out of five and said, "Twista's overshadowed by [Kanye] West, but with jacked-up soul tunes such as 'Overnight Celebrity', the result, who cares?" The Village Voice, however, gave it a mixed review and said that the album "Suggests nothing so much as Adrenaline Rush part two."

== Commercial performance ==
The first single "Slow Jamz" featured Kanye West and Jamie Foxx. It topped the Billboard Hot 100 and world R&B charts in early 2004. Kamikaze built on the success of "Slow Jamz" to reach the top of the Billboard 200 album charts on release in January 2004 and to go Platinum by March 2004. The second single "Overnight Celebrity" had also reached top 10 on the Billboard Hot 100 and world R&B chart in March 2004. The single "So Sexy" with R. Kelly reached #25 on the Billboard Hot 100, becoming a success.

== Track listing ==
No.	Title	Writer(s)	Producer(s)	Length
1.	"Get Me"	C. Mitchell; F. Taylor; Leon Huff; Cary Gilbert	Toxic	3:10
2.	"Kill Us All"	C. Mitchell; F. Taylor	Toxic	4:13
3.	"Pimp On" (featuring 8Ball and Too Short)	C. Mitchell; P. Smith; T. Shaw; F. Taylor	Toxic	4:02
4.	"Slow Jamz" (featuring Kanye West and Jamie Foxx)	C. Mitchell; Kanye West; E. Bishop; Burt Bacharach; Hal David	West	3:32
5.	"Overnight Celebrity"	C. Mitchell; K. West; Miri Ben-Ari; Michael Bennett; Lenny Williams	West	3:54
6.	"Still Feels So Good" (featuring Jazze Pha)	C. Mitchell; P. Alexander; F. Taylor	Toxic	4:09
7.	"Drinks"	C. Mitchell; F. Taylor	Toxic	4:14
8.	"Badunkadunk" (featuring Jazze Pha)	C. Mitchell; P. Alexander	Jazze Pha	4:14
9.	"One Last Time"	C. Mitchell; K. West	West	4:56
10.	"So Sexy" (featuring R. Kelly)	C. Mitchell; R. Kelly	R. Kelly	3:51
11.	"Higher" (featuring Ludacris)	C. Mitchell; C. Bridges; R. Leverston	Wildstyle	3:31
12.	"Snoopin’" (featuring Danny Boy)	C. Mitchell	Toxic	5:22
13.	"Like a 24" (featuring T.I. and Liffy Stokes)	C. Mitchell; C. Harris	The Legendary Traxster	4:28
14.	"Hope" (featuring Cee-Lo)	C. Mitchell; T. Callaway; F. Taylor; C. Morton	Toxic	4:33
15.	"Sunshine" (featuring Anthony Hamilton)	C. Mitchell; Anthony Hamilton; A. Thelusma; Bill Withers; Skip Scarborough	Red Spyda	3:44
16.	"Art & Life (Chi-Roc)" (featuring Memphis Bleek, Young Chris, and Freeway)	C. Mitchell; M. Cox; C. Reis; L. Pridgen; D. Andrews; B. Bridgeman; Mike Caren; D. Palmer	D-Roy and Mr. B; Mike Caren	4:09
Total length:				66:02

=== Bonus tracks ===
These songs were included on the re-released version of Kamikaze.

17. "So Sexy: Chapter II (Like This)" (featuring R. Kelly)
18. "Freek-a-Leek (Remix)" (featuring Petey Pablo & Jermaine Dupri)

"Y'all Know Who", produced by Toxic, was an international bonus track, while "Get Dat Doe", produced by Don Vito, was a bonus track in the UK

Notes

- "Pimp On" features additional vocals by Bishop Don Magic Juan and Highbeam.
- "Slow Jamz" features additional vocals by Aisha Tyler.
- "Overnight Celebrity" features violins by Miri Ben-Ari, keyboards by John Legend, and additional vocals by Kanye West.
- "Still Feels So Good" features additional vocals by Ms. Kane.
- "Drinks" features additional vocals by Highbeam.
- "Badunkadunk" features additional vocals by Jazze Pha.
- "So Sexy" features guitars by Greg Landfair, additional keys by Rodney East, and additional vocals by JS.
- "Snoopin'" features additional vocals by Danny Boy.
- "Hope" features additional vocal production by Mike Caren and a children's choir led by Yvonne Williams
- "Sunshine" features additional vocal production by Mike Caren

Sample credits

- "Get Me" contains elements from "Here I Am" written by Leon Huff and Cary Gilbert and performed by The Three Degrees.
- "Slow Jamz" contains samples from the composition "House Is Not a Home" written by Burt Bacharach and Hal David and performed by Luther Vandross.
- "Overnight Celebrity" contains excerpts from the composition "'Cause I Love You" written by Michael Bennett and Lenny Williams and performed by Williams.
- "Sunshine" contains elements from "Lovely Day" written by Bill Withers and Skip Scarborough and performed by Withers

== Charts ==
=== Weekly charts ===
Chart (2004)	Peak position
Australian Albums (ARIA)	76
Australian Urban Albums (ARIA)	13
Canadian Albums (Nielsen SoundScan)	49
Canadian R&B Albums (Nielsen SoundScan)	17
Scottish Albums (Official Charts)	32
UK Albums (Official Charts)	19
UK R&B Albums (Official Charts)	4
US Billboard 200	1
US Top R&B/Hip-Hop Albums (Billboard)	1

=== Year-end charts ===
Chart (2004)	Position
UK Albums (OCC)	110
US Billboard 200	32
US Top R&B/Hip-Hop Albums (Billboard)	6
Worldwide Albums (IFPI)	46

== Certifications ==
Region	Certification	Certified units/sales
United Kingdom (BPI)	Gold	100,000^{^}
United States (RIAA)	2× Platinum	2,000,000^{‡}
^{^} Shipments figures based on certification alone.^{‡} Sales+streaming figures based on certification alone.
