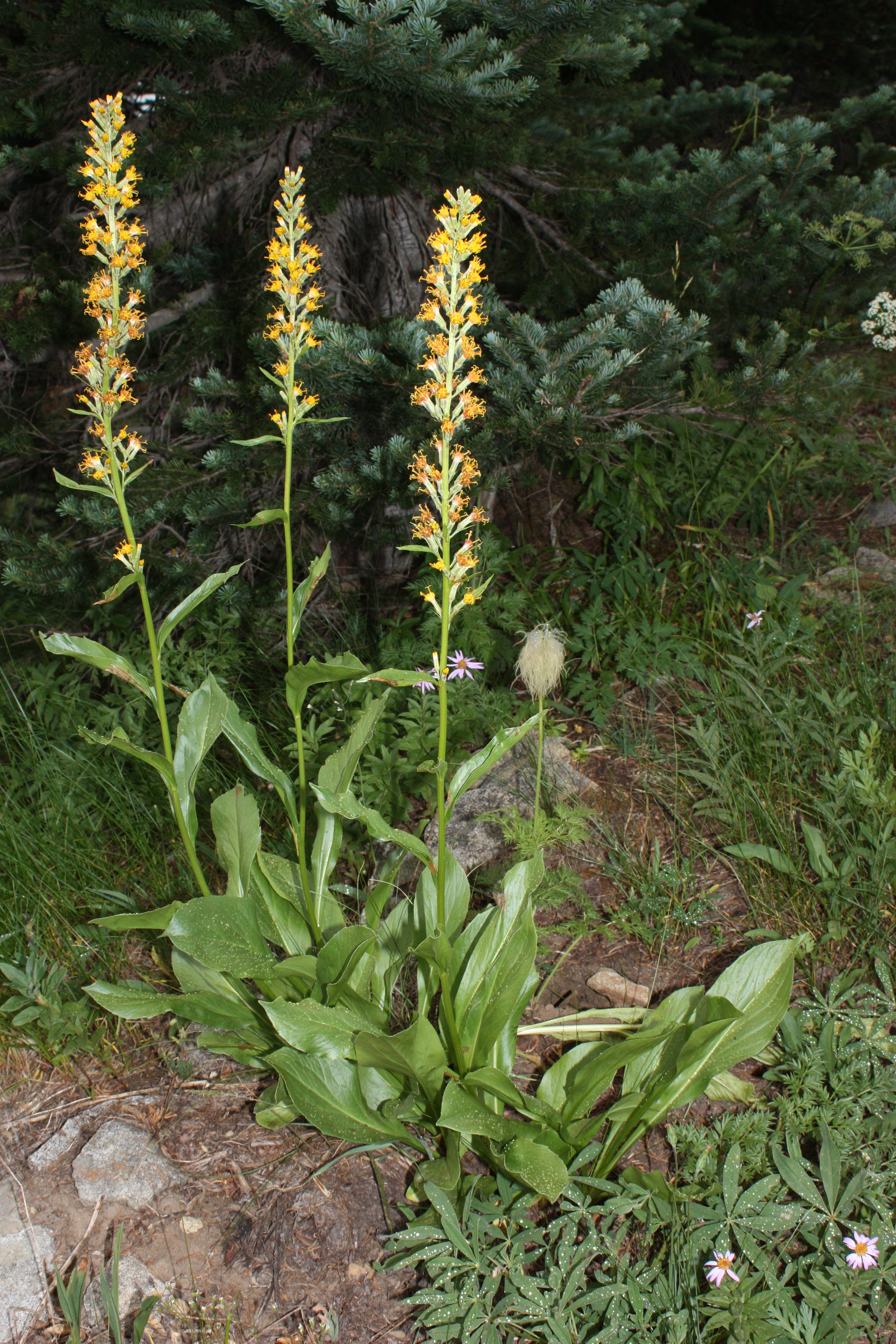
- Rainiera stricta in Mount Rainier National Park

Scientific classification
- Kingdom: Plantae
- Clade: Tracheophytes
- Clade: Angiosperms
- Clade: Eudicots
- Clade: Asterids
- Order: Asterales
- Family: Asteraceae
- Subfamily: Asteroideae
- Tribe: Senecioneae
- Genus: Rainiera; Greene
- Species: R. stricta

Binomial name
- Rainiera stricta (Greene) Greene

= Rainiera =

Genus of plants

Rainiera is a monotypic genus of flowering plants in the daisy family, Asteraceae. The single species, Rainiera stricta (Greene) Greene, is endemic to the northwestern United States (Oregon and Washington). The genus is part of the tribe Senecioneae, and appears to be most closely related to Luina, another genus of northwestern North America, in which it was once placed. Rainiera stricta is of conservation concern, with a G2G3 ranking from NatureServe, and is considered to be globally imperiled. It is known by the common name false silverback.

== Description ==
Rainiera stricta is an herbaceous perennial with both basal and cauline, alternate, petiolate leaves. It has 30-70 discoid heads arranged in a raceme-like or thyrse-like capitulescence. The disk florets are about 5 per head, and have yellow, sometimes purple-tinged corollas. The cypselae (achenes) are glabrous and have a pappus of white or straw-colored bristles. It is distinguished from Luina by the having fewer florets per head and a racemiform, rather than corymbiform, capitulescence.

== Taxonomy ==
The genus name of Rainiera is in honour of Peter Rainier (1741–1808), who was a Royal Navy officer who served during the Seven Years' War, the American Revolutionary War and the Napoleonic Wars. From 1794 to 1805, he was commander-in-chief of the Navy's East Indies Station.

The genus was circumscribed by Edward Lee Greene in Pittonia vol.3 on page 291 in 1898.
