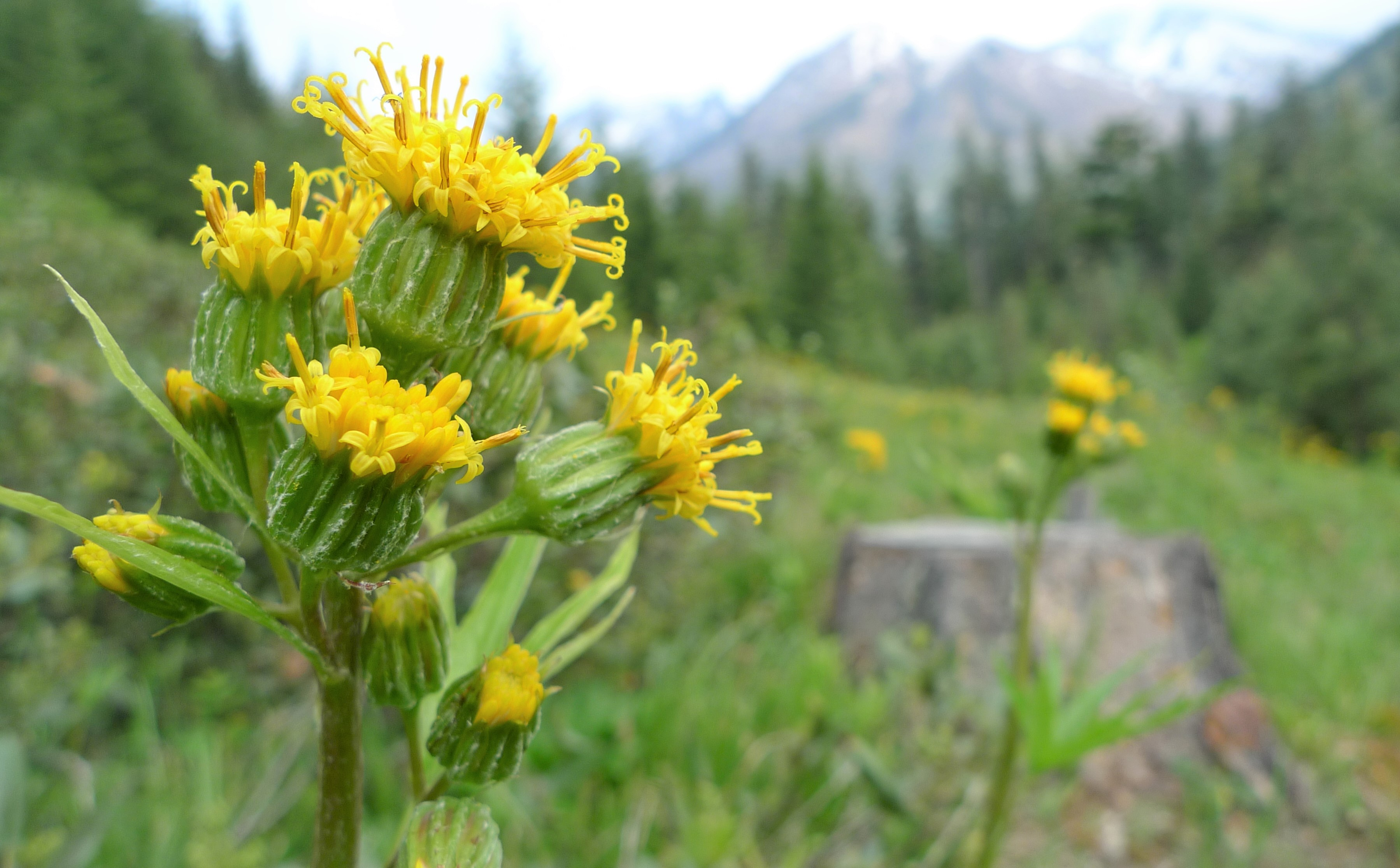
- Cacaliopsis nardosmia near Bridge Creek Campground, Icicle Canyon, Chelan County Washington

Conservation status
- Apparently Secure (NatureServe)

Scientific classification
- Kingdom: Plantae
- Clade: Tracheophytes
- Clade: Angiosperms
- Clade: Eudicots
- Clade: Asterids
- Order: Asterales
- Family: Asteraceae
- Subfamily: Asteroideae
- Tribe: Senecioneae
- Genus: Cacaliopsis; A.Gray
- Species: C. nardosmia

Binomial name
- Cacaliopsis nardosmia (A.Gray) A.Gray

Synonyms
- Cacalia nardosmia A.Gray; Cacaliopsis nardosmia subsp. glabrata (Piper) Piper; Cacalia nardosmia var. glabrata (Piper) B.Boivin; Luina nardosmia var. glabrata (Piper) Cronquist; Luina nardosmia (A.Gray) Cronquist; Luina nardosmia subsp. glabrata (Piper) G.W.Douglas & Ruyle-Dougl.; Cacaliopsis glabrata (Piper) Rydb.; Cacaliopsis nardosmia var. glabrata Piper; Adenostyles nardosmia (A.Gray) A.Gray

= Cacaliopsis =

Genus of flowering plants

Cacaliopsis is a monotypic genus of flowering plants in the aster family, Asteraceae, containing the single species Cacaliopsis nardosmia (formerly Cacalia nardosmia). It is known by the common name silvercrown. It is native to western North America.

== Description ==
This species is a perennial herb growing from rhizomes with a fibrous root system. It has an erect stem reaching about 90 centimetres (35 inches) in maximum height. The leaves are alternately arranged, and most are near the base of the stem. The blades have lobes subdivided into toothed segments. They are hairy to woolly, especially on the undersides. The blades are up to 35 cm (14 in) long and are borne on petioles up to 30 cm long. Blooming from May to July, the flower heads are in arrays or clusters, 1.5–2 cm (5/8–3/4 in) long apiece, with equally long bracts. They contain up to 50 long yellow or orange disc florets and no ray florets. The fruit is a veiny cylindrical cypsela with a long pappus of many barbed, white bristles.

== Distribution and habitat ==
It is distributed from southern British Columbia to northern California, along both the Cascades and northern Coast Ranges. The plant grows in oak and pine forests and meadows, sometimes on serpentine soils.
