= Silverback Gorilla 2 =

Studio album by Sheek Louch
- Released: December 4, 2015
- Recorded: 2014–2015
- Genre: Hip hop
- Length: 45:17
- Label: Tommy Boy
- Producer: Black Saun; C Sharp; Dayzel "The Machine"; DJ Haze; Jimmy Dukes; Joe Milly; L5; Pav Bundy; Sheek Louch; Shortfyuz; Shroom; Sir Bob Nash; Smiley's People; Supastyles; Termanology; Tone Mason

Sheek Louch chronology
| Wu Block (2012) | Silverback Gorilla 2 (2015) |

Professional ratings
Review scores
| Source | Rating |
|---|---|
| AllMusic | 4/5 stars |

Silverback Gorilla 2 is the sixth solo studio album by the American rapper Sheek Louch. It was released on December 4, 2015, via Tommy Boy Entertainment. Production was handled by Jimmy Dukes and Smiley's People, Dayzel the Machine, Shroom, Termanology, Black Saun, C-Sharp, DJ Haze, Joe Milly, L5, Pav Bundy, Shortfyuz, Sir Bob Nash, Supastyles, Tone Mason and Sheek Louch himself. It features guest appearances from Dyce Payne, ASAP Ferg, Billy Danze, Fabolous, Ghostface Killah, Joell Ortiz, Pusha T, Raheem DeVaughn, Swizz Beatz, Trae tha Truth, and his Lox groupmates Jadakiss and Styles P.

The album serves as a sequel to 2008's Silverback Gorilla.

== Track listing ==
| No. | Title | Writer(s) | Producer(s) | Length |
|---|---|---|---|---|
| 1. | "Bunndy" | Sean Jacobs; Paris Wells | Pav Bundy | 1:48 |
| 2. | "Hood Nigga" (featuring Billy Danze, Trae tha Truth and Joell Ortiz) | Jacobs; Eric Murray; Frazier Thompson; Joell Ortiz; Christopher Quirke | DJ Haze | 4:16 |
| 3. | "What You Want the Money For" (featuring Swizz Beatz) | Jacobs; Kaseem Dean; Jim Tyree Slater III; Eric Marrell Smith | Jimmy Dukes; Smiley's People | 3:14 |
| 4. | "I'm Working" (featuring Raheem DeVaughn) | Jacobs; Raheem DeVaughn; James D. Fowler | Dayzel "The Machine" | 1:50 |
| 5. | "Bang Bang" (featuring Pusha T) | Jacobs; Terrence Thornton; Tim Schoegje | Shroom | 2:41 |
| 6. | "Skit" | Jacobs | Sheek Louch | 0:27 |
| 7. | "Hold It Straight" | Jacobs; Daniel Carrillo | Termanology; Shortfyuz; Sir Bob Nash | 1:59 |
| 8. | "Obamacare" (featuring Dyce Payne) | Jacobs; Steven Sherrill; Carrillo | Termanology; L5 | 2:37 |
| 9. | "Trap Stories" | Jacobs; Slater III; Smith | Jimmy Dukes; Smiley's People | 3:07 |
| 10. | "What's on Your Mind" (featuring Jadakiss and A$AP Ferg) | Jacobs; Jason Phillips; Darold Ferguson; Slater III; Smith | Jimmy Dukes; Smiley's People | 2:56 |
| 11. | "What It Is" (featuring Styles P) | Jacobs; David Styles; Anthony McIntyre; Chris Sandy | Tone Mason; C-Sharp | 2:45 |
| 12. | "I Luv It" (featuring Ghostface Killah) | Jacobs; Dennis Coles; Schoegje | Shroom | 3:08 |
| 13. | "No Losses" (featuring Fabolous and Whispers) | Jacobs; John Jackson; Slater III; Smith | Jimmy Dukes; Smiley's People | 3:11 |
| 14. | "Clap" (featuring Dyce Payne) | Jacobs; Sherrill; Fowler | Dayzel "The Machine" | 2:55 |
| 15. | "Legends" | Jacobs; Christian Rodriguez | Supastylez | 2:39 |
| 16. | "You and Me" | Jacobs; Rasun Hinson | Black Saun | 2:29 |
| 17. | "Hood in You" | Jacobs; Joseph R. Loechner | Joe Milly | 3:28 |
| Total length: | | | | 45:17 |

== Charts ==
| Chart (2015) | Peak position |
|---|---|
| US Top R&B/Hip-Hop Albums (Billboard) | 43 |
| US Independent Albums (Billboard) | 28 |
