= Power Summit =

- Status: Inactive
- Genre: Urban music conference
- Frequency: Annually
- Country: United States
- Years active: 1998-2008
- Inaugurated: 1998
- Founder: Rene McLean
- Most recent: 2007
- Attendance: 2,500+
- Organizer: RPM
- Former name(s): Mixshow Power Summit (1998-2004)

Power Summit, previously known as Mixshow Power Summit, is an annual four-day urban music conference. It was established in 1998 by Rene McLean, founder and CEO of RPM GRP. The conference ran for ten years, concluding in 2008. It was the largest urban music conference held in the United States.

== Overview ==
Power Summit was a four-day conference for radio, mixshow and club disc jockeys around the world. The conference included performances from featured artists, keynote speakers, panels, showcases, the Mixshow Power Summit Awards, meet-and-greets and other activities. Beginning in 1998, the conference was established by Rene McLean of RPM. The location of the event changed from year to year, sometimes remaining in the same destination for up to three years in a row.

The event, held in late September to early October, attracted several thousand attendees, disc jockeys and artists including Jay-Z, Eminem, Kanye West, Pharrell, 50 Cent, Alicia Keys, Nas, Lil Wayne, Snoop Dogg, Pitbull, Timbaland, T.I., Common, Ludacris, Busta Rhymes, Wyclef Jean, Queen Latifah, RZA, Young Jeezy, Lil Jon and others.

Keynote speakers included industry veterans such as Def Jam Recordings president Kevin Liles and Warner Music Group chairman Lyor Cohen. The annual Mixshow Power Summit Awards recognized deejays with regional honors for East Coast, Dirty South, Midwest, and West Coast DJ of the Year, as well as radio jockeys nominated for Morning, Afternoon, and Evening shows. Other categories included Mixtape DJ of the Year, Producer of the Year, Hottest Club Banger, Hottest Street Record, and DJ rookie of the year. The conference also showcased various movie premiers including Taxi and 8 Mile, and DVD launches for films such as 2 Fast 2 Furious and the Scarface Anniversary.

In 2004, conference began incorporating the MPS 50K Fight Klub Battle. Starting in 2005, RPM changed the conference title to Power Summit. The annual event was held in various locations over the years including Florida, Nevada, Puerto Rico, Bahamas, and Dominican Republic.

== Conference history ==
- 1998- Mixshow Power Summit September 9–13 Miami, Florida
- 1999- 2nd Annual Mixshow Power Summit September 29- Oct 3 South Beach, Florida
- 2000- 3rd Annual Mixshow Power Summit September 27–30 South Beach, Florida
- 2001- 4th Annual Mixshow Power Summit October 18–21 South Beach, Florida
- 2002- 5th Annual Mixshow Power Summit September 25–28 San Juan, Puerto Rico
- 2003- 6th Annual Mixshow Power Summit September 25–28 San Juan, Puerto Rico
- 2004 - 7th Annual Mixshow Power Summit September 29-Oct 2 San Juan, Puerto Rico
- 2005- 8th Annual Power Summit September 28- October 1 Our Lucaya, Bahamas
- 2006- 9th Annual Power Summit October 5–8 Punta Cana, Dominican Republic
- 2007- 10th Annual Power Summit October 25–28 Las Vegas, Nevada
