= Slow Jamz =

2003 single by Twista

Single by Twista featuring Kanye West and Jamie Foxx

from the album Kamikaze and The College Dropout
- B-side: "I Know"
- Released: November 10, 2003
- Studio: CRC (Chicago)
- Genre: Hip hop; pop rap; R&B; chipmunk soul
- Length: 3:32 (Kamikaze version); 5:16 (The College Dropout version)
- Label: Atlantic; Roc-A-Fella; Def Jam
- Songwriters: Carl Mitchell; Kanye West; Eric Bishop; Burt Bacharach; Harold David
- Producer: Kanye West

Twista singles chronology
"Get It Wet" (1997)	"Slow Jamz" (2003)	"Overnight Celebrity" (2004)

Kanye West singles chronology
"Through the Wire" (2003)	"Slow Jamz" (2003)	"All Falls Down" (2004)

Jamie Foxx singles chronology
"Experiment" (1994)	"Slow Jamz" (2003)	"Gold Digger" (2005)

Alternative cover

Audio
- "Slow Jamz" (Kamikaze version) on YouTube
- "Slow Jamz" (The College Dropout version) on YouTube

"Slow Jamz" is a song by American rapper Twista together with the American rapper and producer Kanye West and American singer and actor Jamie Foxx. Produced by West, it was released in November 2003 through Atlantic and Roc-A-Fella Records, as the lead single from Twista's fourth studio album Kamikaze (2004), and the second single from West's debut studio album The College Dropout (2004). The song was written by Twista and West, with additional writing credits going to Burt Bacharach and Hal David for the sampling of Luther Vandross' cover of Dionne Warwick's 1964 song "A House Is Not a Home". Containing genres of hip hop, pop rap, R&B, and soul, the song's lyrics reference slow jam artists and describes the role of lovermen.

Upon release, "Slow Jamz" peaked at number one on the US Billboard Hot 100, which was the first number one song for Twista, West, and Foxx. The song was positioned at number 16 on the 2004 year-end chart in the United States. It also peaked at number three on the UK Singles Chart, and placed at number 47 on the 2004 year-end chart in the country. The song received a gold certification from the British Phonographic Industry (BPI). "Slow Jamz" received a nomination for Best Rap/Sung Collaboration at the 47th Annual Grammy Awards in 2005, and was nominated for Best Collaboration at the 4th BET Awards in 2004.

== Background and development ==
While hosting a party which included Sean Combs, Missy Elliott, the Neptunes, and Jay-Z, Jamie Foxx first encountered Kanye West, who was recovering from a car crash which shattered his jaw. West performed a freestyle rap which impressed Foxx, and later invited him to his recording studio to record "Slow Jamz". Foxx originally belted the song's hook which consisted of the lyrics, "She said she want some Marvin Gaye, some Luther Vandross". West ridiculed his singing by insisting that the song was hip hop instead of R&B, while Foxx scoffed at his chances of success in the music industry. In a 2017 interview with Power 106, Foxx noted that his desperation to crossover to music led him to host parties with musicians he invited, hoping they would eventually collaborate.

Despite breaking a world record for the fastest rap on the Guinness World Records in 1992 by pronouncing 598 syllables in 55 seconds, Twista questioned the future of his rap career when various rappers began mimicking his "fast-paced style", such as the Poor Righteous Teachers and Fu-Schnickens. The imitation of other rappers, as well as struggles in his own career, forced him to take a job in telemarketing and feature in several guest appearances. In early 2003, Gee Roberson obtained a job at Atlantic Records. He originally established the company venture Hip Hop Since 1978 with Roc-A-Fella Records before leaving for Atlantic, with West being the first artist signed. As an artist signed to Atlantic, Twista needed a single, which allowed Roberson to include West's song "Slow Jamz" on both Twista's fourth studio album Kamikaze (2004), and West's debut studio album The College Dropout (2004).

== Composition ==
"Slow Jamz" is a pop rap, R&B, hip hop and soul song, which pays tribute to previous old-school R&B productions. It samples Vandross' 1981 cover of Dionne Warwick's 1964 ballad "A House Is Not a Home", with its sped-up use in the song being described as "chipmunk soul". The song utilizes a "silky smooth" string accompaniment, in addition to Twista's "lightning-fast" rap. Two versions of the song were released; the version included on The College Dropout added two verses by Foxx. American singer Tracie Spencer is credited as a backing vocalist on the song.

Foxx croons in the chorus over a "speedy drum". After West's verse concluded, American actress and comedian Aisha Tyler appeared on the track to convince him to "do it faster, baby, do it faster!" over a speaker. West responded with the self-deprecating sentence, "Damn, baby, I can't do it that fast, but I know someone who can… Twista!", which segues to the latter's verse. Twista frenetically rhymes with "humorous lyrics" on top of a "laid-back groove", as he name-dropped several artists with a staccato delivery. Within six beats and six seconds, he rapped the lyric, "No matter how much of a thug you see / I still spit it like it's R&B / Come to the club with me / And with some Luther come on / I hope you're feelin me / You'll still-a be in love with me". Writing for The Village Voice, Jon Caramanica noted that West's slow rap allowed Twista's fast rap to complete the song's "narrative arc". The lyrics allude to several lovermen who are "supreme in their seduction means", and reference past slow jam artists such as Gaye, Vandross and Anita Baker, in addition to R&B groups from the 1980s through puns.

=== Artists referenced in "Slow Jamz" ===
List adapted from Vulture and Vinyl Me, Please.

- Marvin Gaye
- Luther Vandross
- Anita Baker
- Ready for the World
- New Edition
- Minnie Riperton
- Biggie Smalls
- Shyne
- Michael Jackson
- Gladys Knight & the Pips
- Smokey Robinson
- Freddie Jackson
- Ashford & Simpson
- Al Green
- The Isley Brothers
- Evelyn "Champagne" King
- The Whispers
- The Spinners
- Earth, Wind & Fire
- Keith Sweat
- Maze
- Jodeci
- Teddy Pendergrass
- Sly and the Family Stone

== Critical reception ==
Barrie Examiner staff writers stated that "Slow Jamz" is a "tribute to old-school R&B love songs", and highlighted West's line as an instant classic, "She got a light-skinned friend look like Michael Jackson / got a dark-skinned friend look like Michael Jackson". Caramanica praised the audacious execution of the "low-concept" song, stating that Foxx's inclusion on the hook should have been a car crash on paper, but was assisted by West's "keen ear for melody and near perfect sample selection". In a review of Kamikaze, The Atlanta Journal-Constitution writers called it a "hilarious bedroom song". Writing for PopMatters, Matt Cibula commended "Slow Jamz" for being "one of the finest rap singles in many years". He described West's verse as "swagger", and was impressed with how Twista added more syllables in his verse than other rappers such as Lyrics Born and Busta Rhymes. Soren Baker of Houston Chronicle stated that the song is a "crowning moment for Twista", and acknowledged that it "showcases his stunning delivery and flow patterns". He also referred to Foxx's chorus as "charmingly nostalgic".

Baker additionally wrote in the Los Angeles Times that West's verse was "playful but unremarkable", but compared Twista's verse to a "lyrical tornado". However, Pitchfork staff writer Sean Fennessey criticized Twista's involvement in a review of Kamikaze, stating that West overshadowed him on the song. Writing for the same publication while reviewing The College Dropout, Rob Mitchum berated the song's extended version, which he described Foxx as "overkill" and Twista as "depleted". Mitchum concluded that it "[remained] the best getting-it-on song ever written about getting-it-on songs".

Writing for Cleveland.com, Troy L. Smith ranked "Slow Jamz" on his list of 100 greatest rap songs since 2000 at number 74. He praised West's creative process of sampling the song, allowing Foxx to "go all out on the hook", and combining Twista's rhymes to create a "hip-hop soul masterpiece". Pitchfork staff ranked the song at number 12 on its Top 50 Singles of 2004 list, writing that it was "the reverse Midas track of 2004" and a "choice musical meta-fiction [sic]". Blender ranked "Slow Jamz" at number 327 on their list of the 500 Greatest Songs Since You Were Born, stating that it was "an old school celebration of [...] gettin' that booty!".

== Accolades ==
"Slow Jamz" received several awards and nominations including; Best Rap/Sung Collaboration at the 47th Annual Grammy Awards, R&B/Rap Collaboration of the Year at the 2004 Source Awards, Best Collaboration at the 2004 MOBO Awards, Best Collaboration at the 2004 BET Awards, and Coolest Collabo at the 2004 Vibe Awards.

Awards and nominations for "Slow Jamz"
Year	Ceremony	Category	Result	Ref.
2004	BET Awards	Best Collaboration	Nominated	
2004	MOBO Awards	Best Collaboration	Nominated	
2004	Source Awards	R&B/Rap Collaboration of the Year	Nominated	
2004	T M H Honors	Hottest Collab Single of the Year	Nominated	
2004	T M H Honors	Favorite Ballad of the Year	Nominated	
2004	Vibe Awards	Coolest Collabo	Nominated	
2005	ASCAP Pop Music Awards	Most Performed Songs	Won	
2005	ASCAP Rhythm & Soul Music Awards	Award Winning Rap Songs	Won	
2005	ASCAP Rhythm & Soul Music Awards	Award Winning R&B/Hip-Hop Songs	Won	
2005	47th Annual Grammy Awards	Best Rap/Sung Collaboration	Nominated	
2005	Groovevolt Music and Fashion Awards	Best Hip-Hop Song Collaboration - Duo or Group	Nominated	

== Commercial performance ==
In the United States, "Slow Jamz" peaked at number one on the Billboard Hot 100 chart dated February 21, 2004, it stayed on the Hot 100 for 22 weeks. It was the first number one song on the chart for Twista, West, and Foxx, the seventh for songwriter Burt Bacharach, and the fourth for songwriter Hal David. The song debuted at the number three peak on the UK Singles Chart dated April 4, 2004, where it charted for 13 non-consecutive weeks. It received a gold certification from the British Phonographic Industry (BPI), for sales and streams of over 400,000 equivalent-units in the United Kingdom. In Australia, "Slow Jamz" debuted at number 32 on the ARIA Singles Chart dated April 4, 2004. It peaked at number 26 on the chart dated May 9, 2004, and remained for 10 weeks. The song peaked at number 9 on the New Zealand Top 40 Singles Chart.

== Music video ==
The music video shows a party; at first Jamie Foxx is seen buying records for the party, then it goes to the party where Kanye West and Twista are. It includes cameo appearances by Consequence, Aisha Tyler, John Legend, Mike Epps, and Common. While the video was being filmed, Twista stated that Foxx "kept the whole place live [sic]". A second version of the music video was filmed in South Side, Chicago, but was unreleased.

== In popular culture ==
British actor Riz Ahmed performed Twista's verse on the sixth season's first episode of American comedy-drama Girls on February 13, 2017. Writing for NME, Sam Moore described his rendition as "near-flawless".

== Credits and personnel ==
Credits adapted from the back cover of "Slow Jamz".

- Written by C. Mitchell, K. West, B. Bacharach, H. David
- Produced by Kanye West
- Recorded at CRC Studios, Chicago, Illinois
- Mixed by Manny Marroquin at the Hit Factory, New York City
- Edited by Mike Caren
- Additional vocals by Aisha Tyler and Tracie Spencer (uncredited)
- Contains samples from the composition "House Is Not A Home", written by Burt Bacharach and Hal David, and performed by Luther Vandross

== Track listing ==
UK CD single

No.	Title	Length
1.	"Slow Jamz" (Radio Edit) (featuring Kanye West & Jamie Foxx)	3:34
2.	"I Know" (featuring Liffy Stokes)	4:10

European maxi single

No.	Title	Length
1.	"Slow Jamz" (Edited) (featuring Kanye West & Jamie Foxx)	3:34
2.	"Slow Jamz" (Instrumental)	3:33
3.	"I Know" (Non Album Bonus Track)	4:10

Australian CD single

No.	Title	Length
1.	"Slow Jamz" (Edited) (featuring Kanye West & Jamie Foxx)	3:34
2.	"Slow Jamz" (Instrumental)	3:33
3.	"Slow Jamz" (Collipark Remix/Explicit)	5:02

== Charts ==
=== Weekly charts ===
Weekly chart performance for "Slow Jamz"
Chart (2004)	Peak position
Australia (ARIA)	26
Australian Urban (ARIA)	9
Belgium (Ultratip Bubbling Under Flanders)	4
Europe (Eurochart Hot 100)	6
Germany (GfK)	58
Ireland (IRMA)	30
Netherlands (Dutch Top 40)	14
Netherlands (Single Top 100)	15
New Zealand (Recorded Music NZ)	9
UK Singles (Official Charts)	3
UK Hip Hop/R&B (Official Charts)	2
US Billboard Hot 100	1
US Hot R&B/Hip-Hop Songs (Billboard)	1
US Hot Rap Songs (Billboard)	1
US Pop Airplay (Billboard)	11
US Rhythmic Airplay (Billboard)	1

=== Year-end charts ===
Year-end chart performance for "Slow Jamz"
Chart (2004)	Position
New Zealand (RIANZ)	48
UK Singles (OCC)	47
UK Urban (Music Week)	23
US Billboard Hot 100	16
US Hot R&B/Hip-Hop Singles & Tracks (Billboard)	9
US Hot Rap Tracks (Billboard)	5
US Mainstream Top 40 (Billboard)	68
US Rhythmic Top 40 (Billboard)	12

== Certifications ==
Certifications for "Slow Jamz"
Region	Certification	Certified units/sales
New Zealand (RMNZ)	2× Platinum	60,000^{‡}
United Kingdom (BPI)	Platinum	600,000^{‡}
United States (RIAA)	3× Platinum	3,000,000^{‡}
^{‡} Sales+streaming figures based on certification alone.

== Release history ==
Release dates and formats for "Slow Jamz"
Region	Date	Format(s)	Label(s)	Ref.
United States	November 10, 2003	Urban contemporary radio	Atlantic	
United States	January 26, 2004	Contemporary hit radio	Atlantic	
Australia	March 22, 2004	CD	Atlantic	
United Kingdom	March 29, 2004	CD	Atlantic	

== See also ==
- List of Billboard Hot 100 number ones of 2004
- List of Hot R&B/Hip-Hop Singles & Tracks number ones of 2004
