= Overnight Celebrity =

2004 single by Twista

Single by Twista

from the album Kamikaze
- Released: March 8, 2004
- Length: 3:53
- Label: Atlantic
- Songwriters: C. Mitchell; K. West; Miri Ben-Ari; Michael Bennett; Lenny Williams
- Producer: Kanye West

Twista singles chronology
"Slow Jamz" (2003)	"Overnight Celebrity" (2004)	"So Sexy" (2004)

"Overnight Celebrity" is the second single from Twista's 2004 album Kamikaze. The song was produced and features uncredited vocals by Kanye West and violin by Miri Ben-Ari. It contains a sample of the 1978 song "Cause I Love You" By Lenny Williams. The song reached number six on the Billboard Hot 100 on May 11, 2004. The song received a nomination for Best Rap Solo Performance at the 47th Annual Grammy Awards.

== Remixes ==
The official remix was made which features rappers Cam'ron & Bumpy Johnson and an unofficial remix was made which features rappers Cam'ron, 50 Cent & DJ Clue.

== Charts ==
=== Weekly charts ===
Chart (2004)	Peak position
Canada CHR/Pop Top 30 (Radio & Records)	26
Germany Black Chart (Official German Charts)	15
Ireland (IRMA)	44
New Zealand (Recorded Music NZ)	12
Scottish Singles Sales (Official Charts)	54
UK Singles (Official Charts)	16
UK Hip Hop/R&B (Official Charts)	5
US Billboard Hot 100	6
US Hot R&B/Hip-Hop Songs (Billboard)	2
US Hot Rap Songs (Billboard)	1
US Pop Airplay (Billboard)	23
US Rhythmic Airplay (Billboard)	3

=== Year-end charts ===
Chart (2004)	Position
UK Urban (Music Week) "Overnight Celebrity" / "Sunshine"	18
US Billboard Hot 100	31
US Hot R&B/Hip-Hop Singles & Tracks (Billboard)	19
US Hot Rap Tracks (Billboard)	6
US Rhythmic Top 40 (Billboard)	15

== Certifications ==
Region	Certification	Certified units/sales
United Kingdom (BPI)	Silver	200,000^{‡}
United States (RIAA)	2× Platinum	2,000,000^{‡}
^{‡} Sales+streaming figures based on certification alone.

== Release history ==
Region	Date	Format(s)	Label(s)	Ref.
United States	March 8, 2004	Rhythmic contemporary; urban contemporary radio	Atlantic	
United States	April 19, 2004	Contemporary hit radio	Atlantic	
United Kingdom	June 21, 2004	12-inch vinyl; CD	Atlantic	
