= Silverback Gorilla =

Studio album by Sheek Louch
- Released: March 18, 2008
- Recorded: 2007–2008
- Genre: Hip hop
- Length: 59:32
- Label: D-Block; Czar; Koch
- Producer: Dame Grease; DJ Montay; Doc Little; J. Cardim; Marcus D'Tray; Mr. Devine; Red Spyda; Soul G.; StreetRunner; The Knocks; Vinny Idol

Sheek Louch chronology
After Taxes (2005)	Silverback Gorilla (2008)	Life on D-Block (2009)

Singles from Silverback Gorilla
- 1. "Good Love" Released: October 30, 2007

Professional ratings
Review scores
Source	Rating
AllHipHop	6.5/10 stars
AllMusic	4/5 stars
HipHopDX	3.5/5
PopMatters	7/10
RapReviews	7/10

Silverback Gorilla is the third solo studio album by American rapper Sheek Louch. It was released on March 18, 2008, via D-Block Records, Czar Entertainment, and Koch Records. Production was handled by Vinny Idol, Mr. Devine, Red Spyda, Soul G., Dame Grease, DJ Montay, Doc Little, J. Cardim, Marcus D'Tray, StreetRunner and The Knocks. It features guest appearances from The Lox, Bun B, Fat Joe, Hell Rell, Jim Jones, Mike Smith, The Bully, The Game and Unk.

In the United States, the album debuted at number 41 on the Billboard 200, number 8 on the Top R&B/Hip-Hop Albums, number 5 on the Top Rap Albums and number 3 on the Independent Albums, selling 17,818 copies in its first week. The following week it dropped to No. 86 with 7,900 copies sold.

Its lead single "Good Love" made it to number 66 on both the Hot R&B/Hip-Hop Songs and R&B/Hip-Hop Airplay, and number 21 on both the Hot Rap Songs and Rap Airplay charts.

A sequel to the album titled Silverback Gorilla 2 was released in 2015.

== Track listing ==
No.	Title	Writer(s)	Producer(s)	Length
1.	"Lottery" (Skit)	Sean Jacobs		0:31
2.	"Think We Got a Problem" (featuring Bun B and The Game)	Jacobs; Bernard J. Freeman; Jayceon Taylor; Ben Ruttner	The Knocks	3:36
3.	"Keep Pushin'" (featuring Mike Smith)	Jacobs; Michael R. Smith; Joshua Marcus	Marcus D'Tray	3:42
4.	"Good Love"	Jacobs; Andy Thelusma	Red Spyda	3:18
5.	"D-Block/Dipset" (performed by The Lox, Hell Rell and Jim Jones)	Jacobs; David Styles; Jason Phillips; Durell Mohammed; Joseph Jones; Loren Lunnon	Mr. Devine	4:00
6.	"We at War"	Jacobs; Nicholas Warwar	StreetRunner	4:07
7.	"Scrap to This"	Jacobs; Randy Ousley	Vinny Idol	3:19
8.	"Don't Be Them"	Jacobs; Gerald Stevens; Michael R. Little	Soul G.; Doc Little	3:40
9.	"Gettin' Stronger" (performed by The Lox)	Jacobs; Styles; Phillips; Stevens; Lamonte Quarles; James Looby	Soul G.; Lamonte & Butch (co.)	3:37
10.	"That's a Soldier"	Jacobs; Ousley	Vinny Idol	3:12
11.	"What What" (featuring The Bully)	Jacobs; Donnelle Little; Damon Blackman	Dame Grease	3:42
12.	"We Comin'" (featuring Unk)	Jacobs; Anthony Platt; Montay Humphrey	DJ Montay	4:31
13.	"Crowd" (Skit)	Jacobs		0:43
14.	"We Spray Crowds"	Jacobs; Lunnon	Mr. Devine	3:44
15.	"Rubber Grip" (featuring Fat Joe and Styles P)	Jacobs; Joseph Cartagena; Styles; Jonas Cardim	J. Cardim	3:32
16.	"2 Turntables & a Mic"	Jacobs; Thelusma	Red Spyda	2:56
17.	"Mic Check"	Jacobs; Ousley	Vinny Idol	3:51
18.	"Go Hoodlums"	Jacobs; Ousley	Vinny Idol	3:31
Total length:				59:32

Sample credits

- Track 4 contains a sample of the composition "Tonight Is the Night" by Betty Wright.
- Track 6 contains elements of the composition "Danger Zone" written by Antonio Bentivegna and Giovanni D'Orazio.
- Track 7 contains elements of the composition "The Great Pretender" by The Platters.

== Charts ==
Chart (2008)	Peak position
US Billboard 200	41
US Top R&B/Hip-Hop Albums (Billboard)	8
US Top Rap Albums (Billboard)	5
US Independent Albums (Billboard)	3
