= Sheek Louch =

American rapper (born 1976)

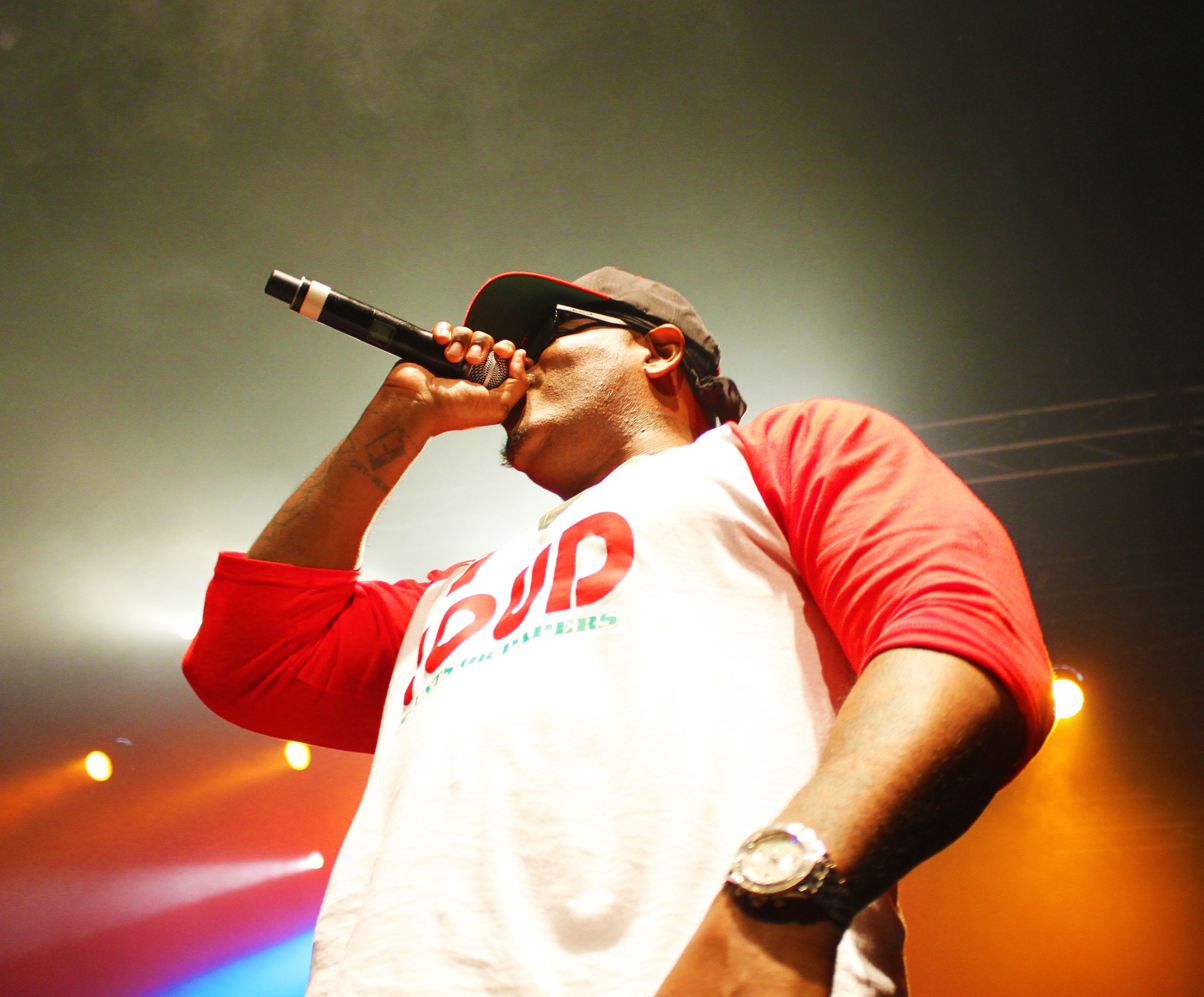
- Jacobs performing at the Sound Academy 2014

Background information
- Also known as: Donnie Def; Donnie G
- Born: Sean Divine Jacobs; September 30, 1976 (age 50); Yonkers, New York, U.S.
- Genre: Hip-hop
- Occupations: Rapper; songwriter
- Years active: 1992–present
- Labels: D-Block; Tommy Boy; Ruff Ryders; Def Jam; Real Talk; Interscope; Koch; Ruff Ryders; Universal; Bad Boy
- Member of: The Lox

Sean Divine Jacobs (born September 30, 1976), better known by his stage name Sheek Louch (or simply Sheek), is an American rapper, best known as a founding member of East Coast hip-hop trio the Lox, which he formed in 1994 with Jadakiss and Styles P.

As a solo act, he is best known for his guest appearance on DMX's 1998 single "Get at Me Dog", which peaked within the top 40 of the Billboard Hot 100.

== Personal life and career ==
Jacobs was born in Yonkers, New York. He is of Jamaican and African-American descent, born to a Jamaican mother from Kingston and an African-American father from Brooklyn.

At around the age of 12, he was inspired to rhyme by his friend Jason Phillips (Jadakiss). He and Jason would later form The Lox with Styles P. Mary J. Blige "discovered" the trio, and they would soon be signed to Sean Combs's Bad Boy Records. Their first album, Money, Power & Respect, was released on January 13, 1998.

Sheek and his fellow LOX members later parted ways with Bad Boy Records, and signed a record deal with their management company, Ruff Ryders, after the company formed a record label in 1998. Ruff Ryders was also home to DMX. The group's second album, We Are the Streets, was released on January 25, 2000. Meanwhile, Sheek, an aspiring entrepreneur, began working on their D-Block brand, building a studio, and looking for new talent to join their roster. In October 2006 he opened a D-Block car wash and gas station in their hometown of Yonkers, New York.

Sheek released his solo debut Walk Witt Me in 2003 on Universal Records through D-Block Records. Early promotional material, such as within the liner notes of Styles P's album A Gangster and a Gentleman, indicate that the album's original title was Walk With Me. His fifth album, Silverback Gorilla, released in 2008, featured his hit single, "Good Love", which sampled Betty Wright's "Tonight Is The Night" and "Pure Love" songs.

He has worked with Ghostface Killah. They collaborated on a joint 2012 album titled Wu Block featuring members of Wu-Tang Clan and D-Block after drawing inspiration from one another while touring and recording. In January 2017 Ghostface and Sheek Louch announced on their respective social media accounts that a second collaborative album was in the works.

== Discography ==
Studio albums

- Walk witt Me (2003)
- After Taxes (2005)
- Silverback Gorilla (2008)
- Life on D-Block (2009)
- Donnie G: Don Gorilla (2010)
- Silverback Gorilla 2 (2015)

Collaborative albums

- Wu Block (with Ghostface Killah) (2012)
