= Hot Dollar =

American rapper

- Also known as: Hot Dolla
- Born: Leon Gray
- Origin: Compton, California, United States
- Genres: Hip hop
- Occupation: Rapper
- Years active: 2004-present
- Labels: Dolla Figga/Island/Def Jam, So So Def

Leon Gray, also known as Hot Dollar (born Leon Gray) is a rapper born in Chicago, Illinois, raised in Hattiesburg, Mississippi and based in Compton, California. He's best known for his 2007 single "Two Steppin' (Streets on Lock)", which samples Tupac's "All Eyes On Me". Rick Ross and Gucci Mane appear on a remix of the track.

Most recently, Hot Dollar released a single in October 2011 titled "Where Is The Love At?".

== Discography ==
=== Mixtapes ===
- 2006: Crack Head Mixtape
- 2007: Money Power and Techs
- 2007: 100 Laws of Power
- 2008: My Dreams...A Day In the Life
- 2008: The Crackhead Mixtape Volume 2
- 2014: Evolution

=== Singles ===
- 2007: "Streetz On Lock"
- 2007: "Sidekick"
- 2011: "Bang Bang Boogie" (featuring Tayf3rd)

=== Guest appearances ===
  - 2009: Hectic - "On the Westside" (I'm a Hustler)
  - 2008: Ditch - "Por Vida" (Public Intoxication)
