= Jadakiss discography =

Hip hop recording artist discography

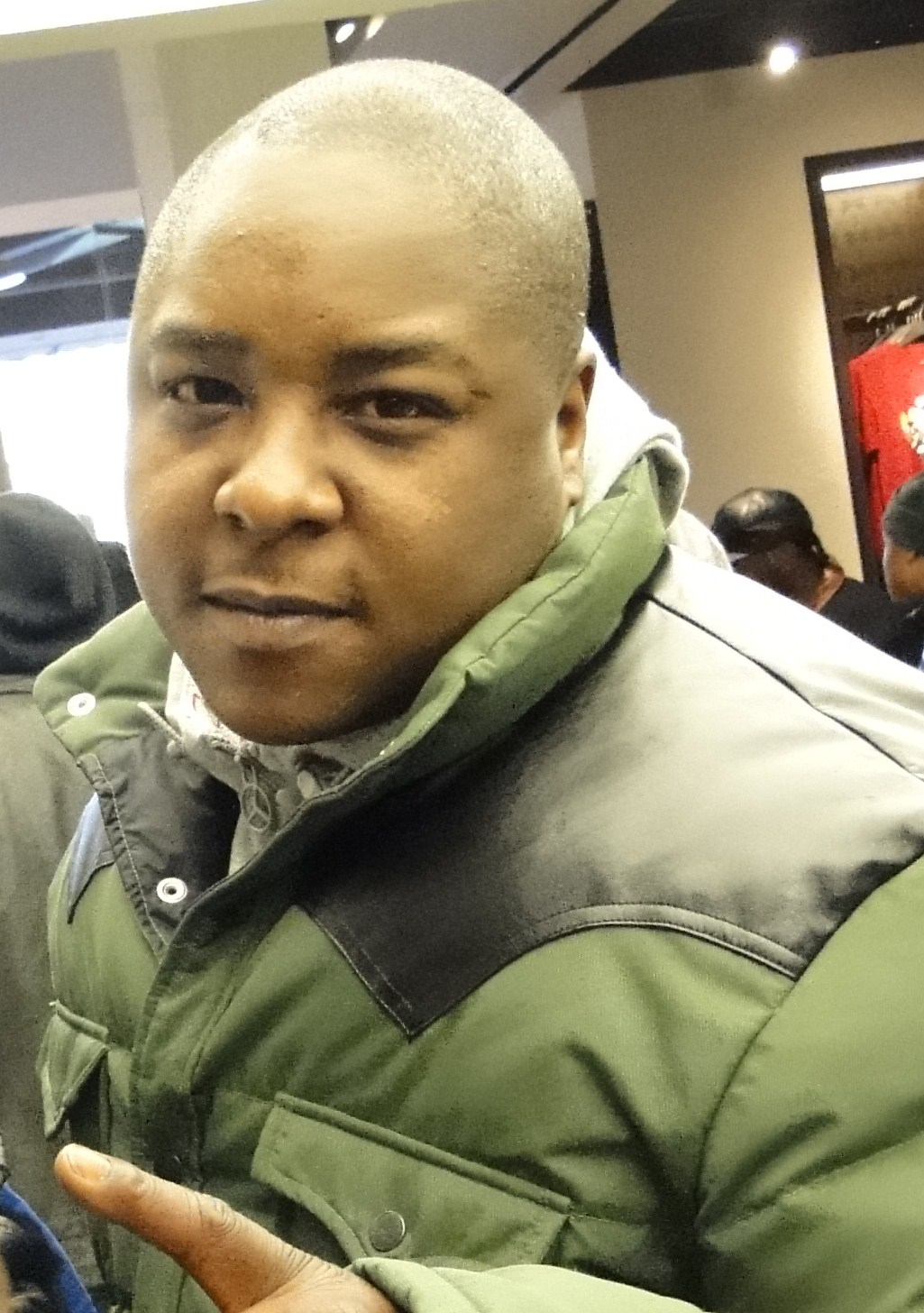
- Studio albums: 6
- Singles: 12
- Music videos: 19
- Mixtapes: 6

The discography of Jadakiss, an American rapper, consists of six studio albums, one collaborative album, six mixtapes and 12 singles.

== Albums ==
=== Studio albums ===
List of albums, with selected chart positions and certifications
Title	Album details	Peak chart positions							Certifications
Title	Album details	US	US R&B	US Rap	CAN	FRA	SWI	UK	Certifications
Kiss tha Game Goodbye	Released: August 7, 2001; Label: Ruff Ryders, Interscope; Format: CD, LP, cassette, digital download	5	2	—	28	—	—	90	RIAA: Gold
Kiss of Death	Released: June 22, 2004; Label: Ruff Ryders, Interscope; Format: CD, LP, cassette, digital download	1	1	1	15	137	—	65	RIAA: Gold
The Last Kiss	Released: April 7, 2009; Label: D-Block, Ruff Ryders, Roc-A-Fella, Def Jam; Format: CD, LP, digital download	3	1	1	44	—	96	—	
Top 5 Dead or Alive	Released: November 20, 2015; Label: D-Block, Ruff Ryders, Def Jam; Format: CD, digital download	4	1	1	67	—	—	—	
Friday on Elm Street (with Fabolous)	Released: November 24, 2017; Label: D-Block, Street Family, Roc Nation, Def Jam; Format: LP, digital download	10	3	3	—	—	—	—	
Ignatius	Released: March 6, 2020; Label: D-Block, Def Jam; Format: LP, digital download	31	19	15	—	—	—	—	
"—" denotes a recording that did not chart or was not released in that territory.

== Mixtapes ==
Title	Mixtape details	Peak chart positions		
Title	Mixtape details	US	US R&B	US Rap
The Champ Is Here	Released: June 14, 2004; Label: Self-released; Format: digital download	—	—	—
Kiss My Ass: The Champ Is Here, Pt. 2	Released: June 5, 2009; Label: Self-released; Format: digital download	—	—	—
The Champ Is Here, Pt. 3	Released: May 2, 2010; Label: Gangsta Grillz; Format: digital download	—	—	—
I Love You (A Dedication to My Fans)	Released: May 23, 2011; Label: D-Block, Ruff Ryders, Def Jam; Format: CD, digital download	40	8	6
Consignment	Released: April 26, 2012; Label: Gangsta Grillz, SoRaspy; Format: digital download	—	—	—
#T5DOA: Freestyle Edition	Released: October 15, 2015; Label: D-Block, So Raspy, Walk Like Us; Format: digital download	—	—	—

== Singles ==
=== As lead artist ===
List of singles as lead artist, with selected chart positions, showing year released and album name
Title	Year	Peak chart positions				Album
Title	Year	US	US R&B	US Rap	FRA	Album
"We Gonna Make It"^{[A]} (featuring Styles P)	2001	—	53	5	—	Kiss tha Game Goodbye
"Knock Yourself Out"^{[B]}	2001	114	34	—	—	Kiss tha Game Goodbye
"Put Ya Hands Up"	2001	—	80	—	—	Kiss tha Game Goodbye
"They Ain't Ready" (with Bubba Sparxxx)	2001	—	60	—	—	Ryde or Die Vol. 3: In the "R" We Trust
"Time's Up" (featuring Nate Dogg)	2004	70	26	19	—	Kiss of Death
"Why" (featuring Anthony Hamilton)	2004	11	4	3	—	Kiss of Death
"U Make Me Wanna" (featuring Mariah Carey)	2004	21	8	9	55	Kiss of Death
"By My Side" (featuring Ne-Yo)	2008	—	53	16	—	The Last Kiss
"Can't Stop Me" (featuring Ayanna Irish)	2009	—	76	—	—	The Last Kiss
"Letter to B.I.G."^{[C]} (featuring Faith Evans)	2009	—	125	—	—	The Last Kiss
"Who's Real"^{[D]} (featuring Swizz Beatz and OJ da Juiceman)	2009	125	39	18	—	The Last Kiss
"Hold You Down"^{[E]} (featuring Emanny)	2011	—	108	—	—	I Love You (A Dedication to My Fans) – The Mixtape
"Big Boy Dialogue" (featuring The-Dream)	2013	—	—	—	—	Non-album single
"Jason" (featuring Swizz Beatz)	2015	—	—	—	—	Top 5 Dead or Alive
"You Can See" (featuring Future)	2015	—	—	—	—	Top 5 Dead or Alive
"Ain't Nothin New" (featuring Ne-Yo and Nipsey Hussle)	2015	—	—	—	—	Top 5 Dead or Alive
"Stand Up" (with Fabolous featuring Future)	2017	—	—	—	—	Friday on Elm Street
"Me"	2019	—	—	—	—	Ignatius
"Kisses To the Sky" (featuring Rick Ross and Emanny)	2020	—	—	—	—	Ignatius
"—" denotes a recording that did not chart or was not released in that territory.

=== As featured artist ===
List of singles as featured artist, with selected chart positions and certifications, showing year released and album name
Title	Year	Peak chart positions										Certifications	Album
Title	Year	US	US R&B	US Rap	AUS	FRA	GER	IRE	NZ	SWI	UK	Certifications	Album
"Honey (Bad Boy Remix)" (Mariah Carey featuring Puff Daddy, Mase & The LOX)	1997	—	—	—	—	—	—	—	—	—	—		Butterfly
"Banned from T.V." (N.O.R.E. featuring Big Pun, Nature, Cam'ron, Jadakiss and Styles P)	1998	—	—	—	—	—	—	—	—	—	103		N.O.R.E.
"The Best of Me" (Mýa featuring Jadakiss)	2000	50	14	—	—	—	26	—	—	64	—		Fear of Flying
"Got It All" (Ruff Ryders featuring Eve and Jadakiss)	2000	88	27	9	—	—	—	—	—	—	—		Ryde or Die Vol. 2
"Back 2 Life 2001" (DJ Clue? featuring Mary J. Blige and Jadakiss)	2001	—	57	—	—	—	—	—	—	—	—		The Professional 2
"Fast Lane" (Bilal featuring Dr. Dre and Jadakiss)	2001	—	41	—	—	—	—	—	—	—	—		1st Born Second
"My Lifestyle" (Remix) (Funkmaster Flex featuring Fat Joe, Jadakiss and Remy Ma)	2002	—	94	22	—	—	—	—	—	—	—		Non-album single
"Day + Night" (Isyss featuring Jadakiss)	2002	98	52	—	—	—	—	—	—	—	—		The Way We Do
"Jenny from the Block" (Jennifer Lopez featuring Styles P and Jadakiss)	2002	3	22	—	5	5	7	12	6	4	3	ARIA: 3× Platinum; IFPI SWI: Gold; RIANZ: Gold; SNEP: Gold	This Is Me... Then
"Bigger Business" (Swizz Beatz featuring Ron Isley, P. Diddy, Birdman, Jadakiss, Snoop Dogg, Cassidy and TQ)	2002	—	72	—	—	—	—	—	—	—	—		Swizz Beatz Presents G.H.E.T.T.O. Stories
"Mighty D-Block (2 Guns Up)" (Sheek Louch featuring Jadakiss, Styles P and J-Hood)	2003	—	65	—	—	—	—	—	—	—	—		Walk witt Me
"Let's Get It" (Smoot featuring Jadakiss and Swizz Beatz)	2003	—	98	—	—	—	—	—	—	—	—		Hip-Hop Story: The Movie soundtrack
"You'll Never Find (A Better Woman)" (Teedra Moses featuring Jadakiss)	2003	—	86	—	—	—	—	—	—	—	—		Complex Simplicity
"Diamond in da Ruff" (Jaheim featuring Jadakiss and Left Gunz)	2003	—	64	—	—	—	—	—	—	—	—		Still Ghetto
"Run"^{[F]} (Ghostface Killah featuring Jadakiss)	2003	—	102	—	—	—	—	—	—	—	—		The Pretty Toney Album
"Put Your Drinks Down" (Drag-On featuring DMX, Eve, Jadakiss, Birdman and TQ)	2003	—	80	—	—	—	—	—	—	—	—		Hell and Back
"New York" (Ja Rule featuring Fat Joe and Jadakiss)	2004	27	14	10	—	—	—	—	—	—	—		R.U.L.E.
"Come Get It" (Yummy Bingham featuring Jadakiss)	2005	—	—	—	—	—	—	—	—	—	82		The First Seed
"Everytime I Think about Her" (Jaheim featuring Jadakiss)	2006	—	38	—	—	—	—	—	—	—	119		Ghetto Classics
"All I Need"^{[G]} (Sterling Simms featuring The-Dream and Jadakiss)	2008	—	123	—	—	—	—	—	—	—	—		Yours, Mine & The Truth
"Choreographer"^{[H]} (Rhea featuring Jadakiss)	2008	—	107	—	—	—	—	—	—	—	—		Finally
"Respect My Conglomerate"^{[I]} (Busta Rhymes featuring Lil Wayne and Jadakiss)	2009	122	82	—	—	—	—	—	—	—	—		Back on My B.S.
"It Ain't Over Til It's Over" (DJ Khaled featuring Mary J. Blige, Fabolous and Jadakiss)	2011	—	52	—	—	—	—	—	—	—	—		We the Best Forever
"It's Good" (Lil Wayne featuring Jadakiss and Drake)	2011	79	—	—	—	—	—	—	—	—	—		Tha Carter IV
"Pride N Joy" (Fat Joe featuring Kanye West, Miguel, Jadakiss, Mos Def, DJ Khaled, Roscoe Dash and Busta Rhymes)	2012	—	81	—	—	—	—	—	—	—	—		Non-album single
"Oil Money Gang" (Rick Ross featuring Jadakiss)	2013	—	—	—	—	—	—	—	—	—	—		Self Made Vol. 3
"Keep Calm" (DJ Kay Slay featuring Juicy J, Jadakiss, 2 Chainz and Rico Love)	2013	—	—	—	—	—	—	—	—	—	—		Non-album single
"Irregular Heartbeat" (50 Cent featuring Jadakiss and Kidd Kidd)	2014	—	—	—	—	—	—	—	—	—	—		Animal Ambition
"We Get Busy" (Mendeecees featuring Jadakiss)	2016	—	—	—	—	—	—	—	—	—	—		Non-album single
"Moon Roof" (Millyz featuring Jadakiss)	2023	—	—	—	—	—	—	—	—	—	—		Blanco 6
"—" denotes a recording that did not chart or was not released in that territory.

== Other charted and certified songs ==
List of songs, with selected chart positions, showing year released and album name
Title	Year	Peak chart positions	Certifications	Album
Title	Year	US R&B	Certifications	Album
"WW III" (Ruff Ryders featuring Snoop Dogg, Scarface, Jadakiss and Yung Wun)	2000	77		Confessions
"Keep Ya Head Up"^{[J]} (featuring Ann Nesby)	2001	109		Kiss tha Game Goodbye
"Throwback" (Usher featuring Jadakiss)	2004	36		Confessions
"Time's Up!" (Remix) (featuring Nate Dogg)	2004	74		Non-album single
"By Your Side"^{[K]}	2004	106		Kiss of Death
"Kiss of Death"^{[L]}	2004	102		Kiss of Death
"Checkmate"	2005	56		Non-album single
"Who Run This"^{[M]}	2008	118		Kiss My Ass: The Champ Is Here, Pt. 2
"Till It All Falls Down"^{[N]}	2010	123		Non-album single
"600 Benz"^{[O]} (Wale featuring Rick Ross and Jadakiss)	2011	106		Self Made Vol. 1
"Don't Like.1" (with Kanye West, Chief Keef, Pusha T, Big Sean and Jadakiss)	2012	—	RIAA: Platinum	Cruel Summer
"—" denotes a recording that did not chart or was not released in that territory.

== Guest appearances ==
Title	Year	Other artist(s)	Album
"John Blaze"	1998	Fat Joe, Nas, Big Pun, Raekwon	Don Cartagena
"Ruff Ryders' Anthem" (Remix)	1998	DMX, Drag-On, Styles P, Eve, DJ Clue?	The Professional
"We Don't Give a Fuck"	1998	DMX, Styles P	Flesh of My Flesh, Blood of My Blood
"Sexy"	1999	Mary J. Blige	Mary
"Oh No" (Remix)		N.O.R.E., Capone, Big Pun, Angie Martinez	"Oh No"
"Opposite of H2O"	2000	Drag-On	Opposite of H2O
"My Name Is Kiss"	2000	—N/a	Ryde or Die Vol. 2
"Fix Me"	2000	Parle, Eve	Shaft (soundtrack)
"I Don't Care"	2000	Funkmaster Flex	The Mix Tape, Vol. IV
"Family Affair" (Remix)	2001	Mary J. Blige	Non-album song
"Hate Blood"	2001	Jermaine Dupri, Freeway	Instructions
"Livin' the Life"	2001	Butch Cassidy, Prodigy	Violator: The Album, V2.0
"Put Yo Hood Up" (Remix)	2001	Lil Jon & the East Side Boys, Petey Pablo, Roy Woods Jr.	Non-album song
"I'm Not You"	2002	Clipse, Styles P, Roscoe P. Coldchain	Lord Willin'
"Double R What"	2002	Eve, Styles P	Eve-Olution
"Big Business"	2002	Ron Isley	Swizz Beatz Presents G.H.E.T.T.O. Stories / Biker Boyz (soundtrack)
"We Be Like This"	2002	Fabolous, Danny Saber	Blade II (soundtrack)
"I Want a Girl Like You"	2003	Joe	Drumline
"Miss You" (Remix)	2003	Mariah Carey	The Remixes
"Never Scared" (The Takeover Remix)	2003	Bone Crusher, Cam'ron, Busta Rhymes	Non-album song
"We're Back"	2003	DMX, Eve	Grand Champ
"The Set Up" (Dr. Dre Remix)		Obie Trice, Lloyd Banks, Redman	Non-album song
"Can I Talk to You"	2004	Cassidy	Split Personality
"Throwback	2004	Usher	Confessions
"Let Me Love You" (Remix)	2004	Mario, T.I.	Turning Point
"Grand Finale"	2004	Lil Jon & The Eastside Boyz, Bun B, T.I., Nas, Ice Cube	Crunk Juice
"N.I.G.G.A. (Never Ignorant About Getting Goals Accomplished)"	2004	2Pac	Loyal to the Game
"Tell Your Friends"	2004	Drag-On	Hell and Back
"We Belong Together" (Remix)	2005	Mariah Carey, Styles P	The Emancipation of Mimi
"Talk About It"	2005	Cuban Link	Chain Reaction
"Treat Me Like"	2005	David Banner	Certified
"It's Personal"	2006	DMX, Styles P	Year of the Dog...Again
"Problem"	2006	DJ Khaled, Beanie Sigel	Listennn... the Album
"One Blood" (Remix)	2006	Game, Jim Jones, Snoop Dogg, Nas, T.I., Fat Joe, Lil Wayne, N.O.R.E., Jadakiss, Fabolous, Juelz Santana, Rick Ross, Twista, Kurupt, Daz Dillinger, WC, E-40, Bun B, Chamillionaire, Slim Thug, Young Dro, Clipse, Ja Rule, Junior Reid	Doctor's Advocate
"A Bay Bay" (The Ratchet Remix)	2006	Hurricane Chris, Game, Lil Boosie, E-40, Birdman, Angie Locc	51/50 Ratchet
"I'm From the Ghetto"	2007	DJ Khaled, Game, Trick Daddy, Dre	We the Best
"New York"	2007	DJ Khaled, Fat Joe, Ja Rule	We the Best
"Go Getta" (Remix)	2007	U.S.D.A, R. Kelly, Bun B	Cold Summer
"It's Me...(Remix)"	2007	Swizz Beatz, Lil Wayne, R. Kelly	One Man Band Man
"Throw 'Em Under the Bus"	2007	N.O.R.E., Kurupt	Noreality
"Firm Biz '08"	2008	Nicki Minaj	Sucka Free
"Hey Daddy (Daddy's Home) [Ted Smooth Remix]"	2010	Usher	Raymond v. Raymond
"Keep It Rockin"	2011	Maino, Swizz Beatz, Jim Jones, Joell Ortiz	Keep It Rockin
"600 Benz"	2011	Wale, Rick Ross	Self Made Vol. 1
"Inkredible" (Remix)	2011	Trae Tha Truth, Rick Ross	Street King
"Life"	2011	Trae Tha Truth	Street King
"Dopeman"	2011	Fat Joe, Dre	The Darkside Vol. 2
"OJ"	2011	Young Jeezy, Fabolous	Thug Motivation 103: Hustlerz Ambition
"Birthday Song"	2011	Blind Fury	—N/a
"B.E.T."	2011	Fabolous, Styles P	There Is No Competition 3: Death Comes in 3's
"Red, White & Blue"	2012	Yo Gotti	Live from the Kitchen
"88"	2012	Diggy Simmons	Unexpected Arrival
"Willis"	2012	Sonnie Carson	Flight #2012
"Young And Ready"	2012	Emanny	Songs About HER
"Chosen Few"	2012	Lloyd Banks	V.6: The Gift
"I Did It For My Dawgz"	2012	DJ Khaled, Rick Ross, Meek Mill, French Montana	Kiss the Ring
"Low"	2012	The Kid Daytona	Summer Games: The Kid With The Golden Pen
"Black Diamond" (Intro)	2012	Styles P	The Diamond Life Project
"Black Diamond 2 " (Skit)	2012	Styles P	The Diamond Life Project
" Middle Fingers Up"	2012	Nino Man	I'm On Already
"Krazy"	2012	Freddie Gibbs, Jay Rock	Baby Face Killa
"Never Die"	2012	DJ Drama, Cee-Lo Green, Nipsey Hussle, Young Jeezy	Quality Street Music
"Ain't No Turning Around"	2012	Yo Gotti	Cocaine Muzik 7: The World Is Yours
"To The Left"	2012	Yung Joc, Big A	Bitch I'm Joc
"Order Up"	2012	Chubbie Baby, Future	36 Oz, Part 2
"Can't Get Enough"	2012	Peter Jackson, Styles P, Sheek Louch, Jay Vado	—N/a
"Stick Up Kids"	2012	Ghostface Killah, Sheek Louch	Wu-Block
"All in Together"	2012	Ghostface Killah, Sheek Louch, Styles P	Wu-Block
"Crack Spot Stories"	2012	Ghostface Killah, Sheek Louch, Raekwon	Wu-Block
"One Thing" (Remix)	2012	360, Freddie Gibbs	—N/a
"I'm Like That" (Remix)	2012	Papoose, 2 Chainz, Styles P	Most Hated Alive
"Keep Quiet"	2012	Lifestyle	—N/a
"Plus 2"	2013	Mayalino	Bird Day
"Bad Guy"	2013	Juelz Santana	God Will'n
"Warning"	2013	Pat Gallo	Fly Life Ep. 1
"Do This For Real"	2013	Moka Blast	Ladies Love Moka
"Clear"	2013	Currensy	New Jet City
"Ohio To Yonkers"	2013	Bow Wow	Greenlight 5
"6am"	2013	Papoose, Jim Jones	The Nacirema Dream
"Hit'em Up"	2013	Tyga	Hotel California
"Red Eye"	2013	Styles P	Float
"Monsta"	2013	Antwon Bailey, Cory Gunz	Now or Never
"In and Out"	2013	Funkmaster Flex, Styles P	Who You Mad At? Me or Yourself?
"Gangsta of the Year"	2013	Funkmaster Flex, Yo Gotti, Young Jeezy	Who You Mad At? Me or Yourself?
"Married to the Game"	2013	SBOE	All We Got Is Us
"Just Like Magic"	2013	Musical Masquerade, Mavado	—N/a
"Bars"	2013	Tony Touch, Styles P, Sheek Louch	The Piece Maker 3: Return of the 50 MC's
"R.N.S"	2013	Vado, Troy Ave	Slime Flu 4
"You Can"	2013	Loaded Lux, Fred the Godson	You Gon Get This Work
"Heaven or Hell"	2013	Meek Mill, Guordan Banks	Dreamchasers 3
"Never Surrender"	2013	DJ Khaled, Akon, Anthony Hamilton, John Legend, Meek Mill, Scarface	Suffering from Success
"1 Up"	2013	Trae tha Truth, Lil Boss, Wiz Khalifa	I Am King
"The Hope"	2013	Fabolous	The S.O.U.L. Tape 3
"Paranoid" (Remix)	2014	French Montana, Rick Ross, Chinx Drugz, Lil Durk, Diddy	Coke Boys 4
"88 Coupes"	2014	French Montana	Coke Boys 4
"What Happened"	2014	Maino	K.O.B.
"Yayo" (Remix)	2014	Snootie Wild, Fabolous, YG, French Montana	Chapter One
"I Can Hear Sweat"	2014	Girl Talk, Freeway	Broken Ankles EP
"Real Sick"	2014	Lil' Kim	Hard Core
"On The Line"	2014	CB Smooth	Country Boy Smooth
"Hot Nigga" (Remix)	2014	Bobby Shmurda, Fabolous, Chris Brown, Busta Rhymes, Rowdy Rebel, Yo Gotti	—N/a
"Dope House"	2014	Chinx Drugz	Cocaine Riot 5
"Real Rap"	2015	Yo Gotti	Concealed
"Lifes A Bitch Freestyle"	2015	Fabolous	Friday Night Freestyles
"Make It Through the Night"	2015	Joe Budden, Marsha Ambrosius	All Love Lost
"I Lied"	2015	DJ Khaled, French Montana, Meek Mill, Beanie Sigel	I Changed a Lot
"Every Time We Come Around"	2015	DJ Khaled, French Montana, Ace Hood, Vado	I Changed a Lot
"Everyday (Amor)"	2015	Puff Daddy, Styles P, Pusha T, Tish Hyman	MMM
"Old Man Wildin"	2015	Puff Daddy, Styles P	MMM
"Job"	2015	August Alsina, Anthony Hamilton	This Thing Called Life
"Life Like This"	2015	Taiyamo Denku	—N/a
"Old Man"	2016	French Montana, Puff Daddy	Wave Gods
"Groovy Tony / Eddie Kane"	2016	Schoolboy Q	Blank Face LP
"Don't Ever Play Yourself"	2016	DJ Khaled, Fabolous, Fat Joe, Busta Rhymes, Kent Jones	Major Key
"DNA"	2016	Zeda Dead, Styles P	Northern Lights
"Have Mercy"	2016	French Montana, Beanie Sigel, Styles P	MC4
"Trap Phone"	2016	Belly	Inzombia
"Milestone"	2016	Pete Rock, Smoke DZA, BJ The Chicago Kid, Styles P	Don't Smoke Rock
"Life Like This" (Remix)	2017	Taiyamo Denku	Plant The Seed
"NYC"	2017	Faith Evans, The Notorious B.I.G.	The King & I
"Nine Point Five"	2017	Talib Kweli, Styles P, Sheek Louch, Niko Is	The Seven
"Good Man"	2017	DJ Khaled, Pusha T	Grateful
"Get a Bag"	2017	G-Eazy	—N/a
"Back to the Money"	2017	Millyz	Sped Two: The Sequel
"Cartier"	2017	PartyNextDoor	—N/a
"Facts"	2018	Flatbush Zombies	Vacation in Hell
"Summer on Lock"	2018	Royce da 5'9", Pusha T, Fabolous, Agent Sasco	Book of Ryan
"Mic Check"	2019	Giggs	Big Bad...
"Right Now"	2021	Westside Gunn, Stove God Cooks	Hitler Wears Hermes 8: Sincerely Adolf
"Faith"	2021	Russ	Chomp 2
"Nicolas Cage"	2021	Guè	GVESVS
"Hopeless"	2021	Millyz	Blanco 4
"Traffic Jam"	2022	Divine	Gunehgar
"Hole in My Heart"	2023	Lil Tjay	222
"Gimme The World"	2026	AZ	Doe or Die III

== Music videos ==
List of music videos, with directors, showing year released
Title	Year	Director(s)
"We Gonna Make It"	2001	J. Jesses Smith
"Knock Yourself Out"	2001	Little X
"Put Ya Hands Up"	2001	Rubin Whitmore II
"Day & Night" (with Isyss)	2002	Bille Woodruff
"I Want a Girl Like You" (with Joe)	2003	Zoe Saldaña
"Time's Up!"	2004	Chris Robinson
"Why"	2004	Sanaa Hamri
"U Make Me Wanna"	2004	Sanaa Hamri
"By My Side"	2008	Ray Kay
"Can't Stop Me"	2009	Marc Klasfeld
"Letter to B.I.G."	2009	Va$htie
"Who's Real"	2009	Taj
"Hold You Down"	2011	Aristotle Torres
"Toast to That"	2011	Mills Miller
"Jason"	2015	Clifton Bell
"Ain't Nothing New"	2015	Clifton Bell
"Baby"	2015	Itchy House Films
"F vs J Intro" (with Fabolous)	2017	Gerard Victor
"Soul Food" (with Fabolous)	2017	Gerard Victor
"Theme Music" (with Fabolous featuring Swizz Beatz)	2018	Gerard Victor

== See also ==
- The LOX discography
