= The Seven (EP) =

EP by Talib Kweli and Styles P
- Released: April 14, 2017
- Genre: Hip-hop
- Label: Javotti Media; 3D

Styles P chronology
#The1st28 (2012)	The Seven (2017)	Nickel Bag (2018)

Professional ratings
Review scores
Source	Rating
Albumism	3.5/5 stars
Exclaim!	8/10
RapReviews	7/10
XXL	XL (4/5)

The Seven is the collaborative extended play by American rappers Talib Kweli and Styles P. It was released on April 14, 2017, through Javotti Media and 3D. The EP features guest appearances from Chris Rivers, Common, Jadakiss, Little Vic, Niko Is, Rapsody and Sheek Louch. In the United, it debuted at No. 195 on the Billboard 200 and No. 8 on the Independent Albums, spending one week on the charts.

The album was announced in December 2016 by Kweli. Prior to the EP's release, the duo shared a music video for the song "Last Ones", directed by Suj Jus.

== Track listing ==
- All songwriting credits are adapted from ASCAP.

No.	Title	Writer(s)	Length
1.	"Poets and Gangstas"	Talib Kweli Greene; David Styles; Dominick Lamb; Braden Mitchell Watt	4:24
2.	"Brown Guys"	Greene; Styles; Michael Jackson	2:31
3.	"Nine Point Five" (featuring Sheek Louch, Jadakiss and Niko Is)	Greene; Styles; Sean Jacobs; Jason Phillips; Nikolai Pavia; Marco Bruno	4:55
4.	"In the Field"	Greene; Styles; Lamb; Watt	5:01
5.	"Teleprompters" (featuring Common and Little Vic)	Greene; Styles; Lonnie Rashid Lynn; Victor John Orena; Charles Njapa; Oladipo Omishore	3:38
6.	"Let It Burn" (featuring Rapsody and Chris Rivers)	Greene; Styles; Lamb; Watt	3:47
7.	"Last Ones"	Greene; Styles; Lamb; Watt	5:15

== Charts ==
Chart (2017)	Peak position
US Billboard 200	195
US Independent Albums (Billboard)	8
