= Time's Up (Jadakiss song) =

2004 single by Jadakiss featuring Nate Dogg

Single by Jadakiss featuring Nate Dogg

from the album Kiss of Death
- Released: April 20, 2004
- Studio: Powerhouse Studios (Yonkers, New York)
- Genre: Hip-hop
- Length: 3:36
- Label: Ruff Ryders; Interscope
- Songwriters: Jason Phillips; Nathaniel Hale; Scott Storch
- Producer: Storch

Jadakiss singles chronology
"Run" (2003)	"Time's Up" (2004)	"Why" (2004)

Nate Dogg singles chronology
"The Set Up" (2003)	"Time's Up" (2004)	"I Like That" (2004)

Music video
- "Time’s Up" on YouTube

"Time's Up" (also titled "Time's Up!") is a song by American rapper Jadakiss, released on April 20, 2004, as the lead single from his second studio album Kiss of Death (2004). The song features American singer Nate Dogg and was produced by Scott Storch. Lyrically, the song sees Jadakiss rapping about his journey to becoming a rapper in the industry.

== Critical reception ==
The song received positive reviews from critics. Mitch Findlay of HotNewHipHop praised Jadakiss's lyricism on the track, adding, "It's about as cold a banger as they come, a perfect example of Jadakiss' ability to retain crossover appeal while spitting bars at a high caliber."

In an interview with XXL, Jadakiss revealed that Eminem had called him about the lyrics "Fuck riding the beat, nigga / I parallel park on the track", which the latter praised.

== Music video ==
The official music video of the song was directed by Chris Robinson. It finds Jadakiss looking visibly unhappy while rapping, and attending a funeral.

== Charts ==
Chart (2004)	Peak position
US Billboard Hot 100	70
US Hot R&B/Hip-Hop Songs (Billboard)	26
US Hot Rap Songs (Billboard)	19
US Rhythmic Airplay (Billboard)	37

== Release history ==
Region	Date	Format(s)	Label(s)	Ref.
United States	April 26, 2004	Rhythmic contemporary · urban contemporary radio	Ruff Ryders, Interscope	
