= I Love You (A Dedication to My Fans) =

Mixtape by Jadakiss
- Released: May 23, 2011
- Recorded: 2010–2011
- Genre: Hip hop
- Length: 32:09
- Labels: Def Jam, D-Block, Ruff Ryders
- Producers: Chach, J Butta, Icepick, DaRock, Bink!, Pav Bundy, Remo The Hit Maker, Mr. Inkredible, Black Saun, DJ O.P.

Jadakiss chronology
| The Champ Is Here, Pt. 3 (2010) | I Love You (A Dedication to My Fans) (2011) | Consignment (2012) |

Singles from I Love You (A Dedication To My Fans)
- 1. "Hold You Down" Released: May 10, 2011

I Love You (A Dedication to My Fans) is the fourth mixtape by American rapper Jadakiss. It was released on May 23, 2011. The mixtape features guest appearances from Emanny, Teyana Taylor, Styles P, Chynk Show, Fred the Godson, Trae tha Truth, and Rick Ross. It has sold 44,000 copies in the US as of September 2015.

== Critical response ==
Professional ratings
Review scores
| Source | Rating |
|---|---|
| HipHopDX | 3.5/5 stars |
| XXL | (XL) |

I Love You (A Dedication to My Fans) was met with generally favorable reviews from music critics. Alex Thornton at HipHopDX gave the mixtape three and a half stars, saying "No one is likely to confuse I Love You with a real album given its reused tracks and limited scope, but it's still actually better than The Last Kiss in many respects. It's certainly worth listening to and does manage to earn the "official mixtape" status it's been granted by Def Jam. As usual, the date for Jada's next actual album seems to be up in the air, but I Love You makes the wait a little easier." Adam Fleischer of XXL gave the mixtape an XL, saying "On I Love You (A Dedication to My Fans), the Yonkers emcee's potent delivery is generally at home over a variety of sonic backdrops. The feel good "Lil Bruh" featuring Pharrell is an upbeat and refreshing take on giving advice to young'ns. Later, the street savvy "Lay Em Down," features yet another outstanding Jada-Styles P back and forth—a treat for rap fans every time it goes down. On the flip side, there are some misses. The somber "In The Streets" is a bit cliché in its content and structure and epitomizes the drawback of Kiss's decision to use R&B hooks on nearly every track on the project. In the end, though, I Love You (A Dedication to My Fans) reminds why Kiss has been able to enjoy such longevity in the game."

== Track listing ==
| No. | Title | Producer(s) | Length |
|---|---|---|---|
| 1. | "Intro" | Chach | 0:41 |
| 2. | "Hold You Down" (featuring Emanny) | J Butta | 2:49 |
| 3. | "Lil Bruh" | Icepick | 3:06 |
| 4. | "How I Feel" | DaRock | 3:21 |
| 5. | "Rock Wit Me" (featuring Teyana Taylor) | Bink! | 3:11 |
| 6. | "In the Streets" | DaRock | 2:49 |
| 7. | "Lay 'Em Down" (featuring Styles P & Chynk Show) | Pav Bundy | 3:35 |
| 8. | "Toast (Intro)" | | 0:34 |
| 9. | "Toast To That" (featuring Fred the Godson) | Remo The Hit Maker | 4:18 |
| 10. | "Inkredible (Remix)" (featuring Trae tha Truth & Rick Ross) | Mr. Inkredible | 3:34 |
| 11. | "Gone Too Long" | Black Saun, DJ O.P. | 4:08 |

== Charts ==
| Chart (2011) | Peak position |
|---|---|
| US Billboard 200 | 40 |
| US Top R&B/Hip-Hop Albums (Billboard) | 8 |
