= Consignment (mixtape) =

Mixtape by Jadakiss
- Released: April 27, 2012
- Recorded: 2011–2012
- Genre: Hip hop
- Label: D-Block; Gangsta Grillz; SoRaspy
- Producer: A83; Sebb Media; Jahlil Beats; Cheeze Beatz; Mally the Martian; Black Saun; Divine Bars; Equator Line; Poobs; Keyzz and Pryme; Joe Milly; AraabMuzik; Pav Bundy; Pitchshifters; VDon

Jadakiss chronology
I Love You (A Dedication to My Fans) (2011)	Consignment (2012)	Top 5 Dead or Alive (2015)

Consignment is the fifth mixtape released by rap artist Jadakiss. It was released on April 27, 2012. The mixtape has been downloaded over 1 million times on DatPiff, certifying it double platinum. The mixtape features guest appearances from Wale, French Montana, Styles P, Meek Mill, Yung Joc, Fabolous, Lloyd Banks, Young Jeezy, Yo Gotti, Ace Hood, Waka Flocka Flame, Slim Dunkin, 2 Chainz, Emanny, Cito, Goldie, Swerv, Future, Gucci Mane, Sheek Louch and Trae Tha Truth.

== Background ==
On April 1, 2012, Jadakiss announced his fifth mixtape Consignment.

== Critical reception ==
Professional ratings
Review scores
Source	Rating
XXL	(L)

Consignment was met with generally mixed reviews from music critics. Jesse Fairfax of HipHopDX said "Overall, much of Consignment reflects the watered down state of a scene where artificial team ups are designed to tackle the risk of dedicated fandom not being enough for East Coast emcees to stay afloat. As Jadakiss readies Top 5 Dead Or Alive, he should keep in mind his natural ability to stand out from the bunch, as accessories aren't always necessary." Ralph Bristout of XXL gave the mixtape an L, criticizing the excessive number of features; while praising the lyrics, he took issue with the beats as "consistently [not] up to par" with Jadakiss's rapping.

== Track listing ==
No.	Title	Producer(s)	Length
1.	"Intro"		0:47
2.	"Nightmares & Migraines"	Sebb Media, A83	2:28
3.	"Paper Tags" (featuring Wale, French Montana & Styles P)	Jahlil Beats	2:49
4.	"By The Bar" (featuring Meek Mill & Yung Joc)	Cheeze Beatz	4:23
5.	"Respect It" (featuring Fabolous & Lloyd Banks)	Mally the Martian	4.07
6.	"Traffickin" (featuring Young Jeezy & Yo Gotti)	Black Sain	4:07
7.	"Hustle Like A Muh" (featuring Ace Hood & Styles P)	Divine Bars, Equator Line	3:43
8.	"Back To The Money" (featuring Waka Flocka Flame, Slim Dunkin, & French Montana)	Black Sain	4:08
9.	"Dope Boy" (featuring Styles P)	Poobs	2:23
10.	"Count It" (featuring 2 Chainz & Styles P)	Keyzz & Pryme	4:24
11.	"Without You"	Joe Milly	2:26
12.	"Cuz We Paid" (featuring Emanny)	Keyzz & Pryme	3:37
13.	"Street Knock (Raspy Mix)" (featuring Swizz Beatz & A$AP Rocky)	AraabMuzik	2:41
14.	"I'm Good" (featuring Cito & Goldie)	Divine Bars, Equator Line	5:06
15.	"Thangs On Deck" (featuring Swerv)	Pav Bundy	3:23
16.	"Turn Up" (featuring Wale & Future)	Pitchshifters	3:26
17.	"I Want In" (featuring Gucci Mane & Sheek Louch)	Divine Bars, Equator Line	3:56
18.	"We Gettin Money" (featuring Trae Tha Truth & Styles P)	VDon	4:04
19.	"Shaheem Reid Interview"		3:30
