= Knock Yourself Out =

Single by Jadakiss

Single by Jadakiss

from the album Kiss tha Game Goodbye
- Released: 2001
- Genre: East Coast hip-hop
- Length: 3:32
- Label: Ruff Ryders; Interscope
- Songwriters: Jason Phillips; Pharrell Williams; Charles Hugo
- Producer: The Neptunes

Jadakiss singles chronology
"We Gonna Make It" (2001)	"Knock Yourself Out" (2001)	"Put Ya Hands Up" (2001)

Music video
- "Knock Yourself Out" on YouTube

"Knock Yourself Out" is a song by American rapper Jadakiss, and the second single from his debut studio album Kiss tha Game Goodbye (2001). The song was produced by The Neptunes.

== Background ==
The song originally had a different beat, produced by Pharrell Williams, who also came up with the hook. Pharrell changed the beat, because he thought it was too slow for the song. When Jadakiss heard the new instrumental, he was not satisfied with it, but fellow rapper Styles P suggested he use the beat anyway. Jadakiss liked the new beat, but not as much as the original. Rap duo Clipse used the same beat on their debut album Exclusive Audio Footage on the track "Hear Me Out".

== Music video ==
The music video was shot in Malibu, California on July 3, 2001 and directed by Little X. It features Canadian model Melyssa Ford and a scene of her diving in a pool.

== Remix ==
An unreleased remix of the song features American rapper Ludacris. In February 2018, Ludacris shared a snippet of the remix in an interview with Ebro Darden on Beats 1.

== Charts ==
Chart (2001)	Peak position
US Bubbling Under Hot 100 (Billboard)	14
US Hot R&B/Hip-Hop Songs (Billboard)	34
