= Moka Blast =

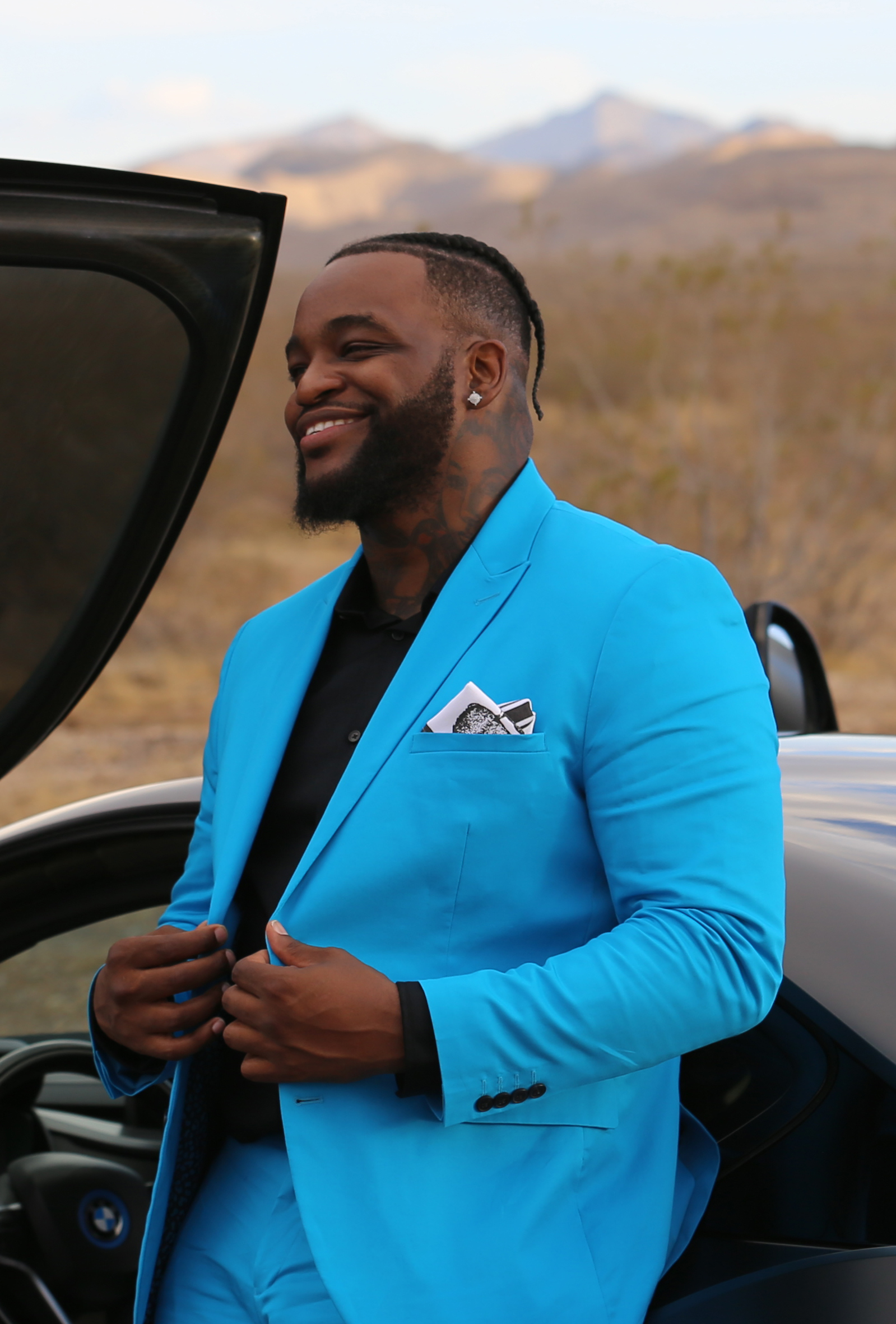

Background information
- Also known as: The Forever Getting Cash General, Ladies Love Moka & Blast the Beautiful
- Born: Lydell R Birch; September 22, 1979 (age 46); Arima, Trinidad and Tobago
- Genres: Rap, Hip-Hop
- Occupation(s): Rapper, Entrepreneur
- Website: mokablast.com

Moka Blast (born September 22, 1979), also known by the stage names Ladies Love Moka or Blast the Beautiful, is an American rapper, singer, songwriter, videographer, and entrepreneur. Moka has worked independently with multiple production companies, music labels, and talent agencies in North America, Europe, Asia and Africa. Moka also runs his own barbershop franchise in Las Vegas, launched 2020.

== Early life ==
Lydell Birch was born on September 22, 1979, in Trinidad and Tobago and lives in the United States.

== Career ==
In 2014, Moka Blast released a mixtape with DJ Superstar Jay. Birch appeared on the cover of Coast 2 Coast, which ran an interview with him about his experiences.

In 2015, Moka Blast appeared in the late summer 2015 edition of Hypefresh.

In 2016 he released the album Blast Radiius.

Before the release of his second album, The Blast Supper in spring 2017, Birch performed on tour with British musician Lady Leshurr in the U.K. From February through May of that year, he also went on a group tour in the U.S.

In 2016, he launched a clothing line.

== Legal Issues ==
In April 2023, Birch was livestreaming from the home of a woman he was seeing, when her on-again-off-again partner, Lendor Coney Jr allegedly barged into the house. Birch shot and killed Coney Jr.

As a result of the livestreamed shooting, several women who believed they were in a monogamous relationship with Birch became aware of each other. A Facebook page, “Victims of Lydell (aka Moka Blast) The Serial Scammer” has over 3000 members. Some of these women allege that Birch scammed them out of thousands of pounds, which he has yet to repay.

== Discography ==
- Blast Radiius (2016)
- The Blast Supper (2017)
- The Blast Testament (2017)
- Hiighly Irritable (2019)
- Sorry I Took so Long (2022)
