= Why (Jadakiss song) =

2004 single by Jadakiss

Single by Jadakiss featuring Anthony Hamilton

from the album Kiss of Death
- Released: July 13, 2004
- Recorded: 2004
- Genre: Political hip-hop
- Label: Ruff Ryders; Interscope
- Songwriters: J. Phillips, A. Hamilton, K. Muchita, P. Moerlen
- Producer: Havoc

Jadakiss singles chronology
"Time's Up" (2004)	"Why" (2004)	"U Make Me Wanna" (2004)

Music video
- "Why?" on YouTube

"Why" is a protest song by American rapper Jadakiss, released on July 13, 2004 by Def Jam Recordings as the second single released from his second solo album Kiss of Death (2004). It was produced by Havoc, features a guest appearance from Anthony Hamilton, and contains a sample of Gong's 1976 song "Mandrake" throughout.

"Why" was a crossover hit in several countries. It remains Jadakiss' highest-charting song on the Billboard Hot 100, where it peaked at number 11. The remix was produced by Elite and has an altered chorus by Hamilton, as well as appearances from Styles P, Common and Nas.

Although not a remix nor a sequel, Jadakiss released the song "What If" that follows the same concept as "Why". All of the verses start with the song title. It included Nas (who - as mentioned above - was featured in the remix of "Why").

== Controversy ==
Jadakiss attracted some controversy and condemnation from the political commentator Bill O'Reilly, who labeled him a "smear merchant" because of the lyrics in "Why", which state Jadakiss' belief that the September 11 attacks were an inside job, or that then-President George W. Bush caused or allowed the attacks:

Why do niggas push pounds of powder?/Why did Bush knock down the towers?

"Bush" is censored in clean versions of the song. The music video shows a man holding up a picket sign reading "BUCK FUSH" - a spoonerism of "FUCK BUSH".

O'Reilly took the position that President Bush should be allowed to sue Jadakiss for slander. The track was eventually banned on some radio stations or played with the lyrics in question censored.

== Music video ==
In the music video, Jadakiss raps while appearing as a gangsta, a news anchor, and a homeless man, and also acting out some of the lyrics. In the third verse, Jadakiss appears wearing a white t-shirt with the word "WHY?" on it, leading a protest. Several people also wear the same t-shirt. Anthony Hamilton also appears, first singing the chorus separately, then as part of the march at the end. In the crowd, a man is shown holding up the picket sign reading "BUCK FUSH".

== Track listing ==
1. "Why" (album version)
2. "Why" Remix feat. Kool Savas
3. "Kiss of Death" (main version)
4. "The Champ Is Here" (explicit version)
5. "Why" (video)

== Charts ==
=== Weekly charts ===
Chart (2004)	Peak position
US Billboard Hot 100	11
US Hot R&B/Hip-Hop Songs (Billboard)	4
US Hot Rap Songs (Billboard)	3
US Rhythmic Airplay (Billboard)	12

=== Year-end charts ===
Chart (2004)	Position
US Billboard Hot 100	62
US Hot R&B/Hip-Hop Songs (Billboard)	25

== Release history ==
Region	Date	Format(s)	Label(s)	Ref.
United States	July 12, 2004	Rhythmic contemporary · urban contemporary radio	Ruff Ryders, Interscope	
