= Kiss of Death (Jadakiss album) =

Studio album by Jadakiss
- Released: June 22, 2004
- Recorded: 2003–2004
- Studios: Evil Genius Studios (New York, NY); Powerhouse Studios (Yonkers, NY); Groovyville Studios (Los Angeles, CA); Tha Chuuuch (California); Right Trax Studios (New York, NY); 54 Sound (Detroit, MI)
- Genres: East Coast hip-hop; hardcore hip-hop
- Length: 62:54
- Labels: Ruff Ryders; Interscope
- Producers: Alchemist; Baby Grand; Black Key; DJ Green Lantern; Elite; Eminem; Havoc; JellyRoll; Kanye West; Neo Da Matrix; Red Spyda; Scott Storch; Swizz Beatz; The Neptunes

Jadakiss chronology
| Kiss tha Game Goodbye (2001) | Kiss of Death (2004) | The Last Kiss (2009) |

Singles from Kiss of Death
- 1. "Time's Up" Released: April 20, 2004; 2. "Why" Released: July 13, 2004; 3. "U Make Me Wanna" Released: October 12, 2004

Kiss of Death is the second solo studio album by American rapper Jadakiss. It was released on June 22, 2004, via Ruff Ryders/Interscope Records. Recording sessions took place at Powerhouse Studios, Evil Genius Studios and Right Trax Studios in New York, Groovyville Studios and Tha Chuuuch in California and 54 Sound in Detroit.

Production was handled by Black Key, Neo Da Matrix, Scott Storch, Alchemist, Baby Grand, DJ Green Lantern, Elite, Eminem, Havoc, JellyRoll, Kanye West, Red Spyda, Swizz Beatz and The Neptunes, with Darrin Dean, Joaquin "Waah" Dean and Alex Higdon serving as executive producers. It features guest appearances from his The Lox cohorts Sheek Louch and Styles P, as well as Anthony Hamilton, DJ Quik, Eminem, Kanye West, Mariah Carey, Nate Dogg, Pharrell Williams, Snoop Dogg and Nesha.

In the United States, the album debuted at number one on both the Billboard 200 and the Top R&B/Hip-Hop Albums charts, selling 246,000 copies in its first week. It also made it to number 65 on the UK Albums Chart and number 10 on the UK Hip Hop and R&B Albums Chart, and number 139 in France. On July 12, 2004, it was certified gold by the Recording Industry Association of America for sales of over 500,000 copies in the US alone. By October 2005, the Kiss Of Death had sold 1.7 million copies in the U.S. and 2.1 million copies worldwide.

The album was supported by three singles "Time's Up", "Why" and "U Make Me Wanna" with accompanying music videos. All the singles went charted on the US Billboard Hot 100, peaking at No. 70, 11 and 21, respectively.

== Critical reception ==
Professional ratings
Aggregate scores
| Source | Rating |
|---|---|
| Metacritic | 76/100 |
Review scores
| Source | Rating |
| AllHipHop | 4/5 stars |
| AllMusic | 3/5 stars |
| Entertainment Weekly | B |
| HipHopDX | 4/5 |
| Now | 3/5 Ns |
| RapReviews | 8.5/10 |
| Rolling Stone | 3/5 stars |
| Spin | A− |
| Vibe | 4/5 stars |
| USA Today | 3.5/4 stars |

Kiss of Death was met with generally favourable reviews from music critics. At Metacritic, which assigns a normalized rating out of 100 to reviews from mainstream publications, the album received an average score of 76 based on eleven reviews.

In his album review for Spin, Chris Ryan named Jadakiss "one of the four or five best MCs breathing". Steve Jones of USA Today saw Jadakiss "grow in stature as he expands his repertoire from rugged street tales" and "shows he's maturing into a more well-rounded artist". William Ketchum III of RapReviews resumed: "Kiss of Death is the Jadakiss album that everybody's been waiting for, 'Kiss fans and critics alike". Matt Barone of AllHipHop called it "a must-have release that should help place Jadakiss amongst rap's current elite without any argument". Jeff Ryce of HipHopDX stated: "Jada is a really nice emcee, he proved here he can be diverse without losing his strengths and create a good album". Alvin Blanco of Vibe concluded: "with Kiss of Death, Jada's well on his way to achieving hip hop immortality". Steven Chen of Entertainment Weekly summed up: "doesn't astound, but Jada flexes impressive muscles as he grinds his heels into a well-trodden dance floor". Nathan Rabin of The A.V. Club called it "uneven", adding "like Kiss tha Game Goodbye, it suffers from an apparent desire to satisfy every demographic at once".

In mixed reviews, AllMusic's Andy Kellman stated: "no matter the number of bright moments, you can't help but feel that Jadakiss has his best days ahead of him". Nick Flanagan of Now found "the choruses aren't always memorable, and when the songs have forgettable R&B; hooks and are forgettable, it can make for aggravating moments. But when Jadakiss has a heavy beat behind him, this record stands with the year's best". Jon Caramanica of Rolling Stone wrote: "when he's undone, it's by tinkertoy production on tracks such as the insipid Mariah Carey Vehicle 'U Make Me Wanna'".

== Track listing ==
| No. | Title | Writer(s) | Producer(s) | Length |
|---|---|---|---|---|
| 1. | "Intro" | Jason Phillips; James D'Agostino | DJ Green Lantern | 1:13 |
| 2. | "What You So Mad At??" | Phillips; Mickey Davis | Black Key | 3:37 |
| 3. | "Shine" (featuring Snoop Dogg and DJ Quik) | Phillips; Calvin Broadus; David Blake; David Drew; Saundralin Green | Jelly Roll | 5:00 |
| 4. | "Bring You Down" | Phillips; Quaadir Atkinson | Neo Da Matrix | 3:39 |
| 5. | "Time's Up" (featuring Nate Dogg) | Phillips; Nathaniel Hale; Scott Storch | Scott Storch | 3:36 |
| 6. | "Why" (featuring Anthony Hamilton) | Phillips; Anthony Hamilton; Kejuan Muchita; Pierre Moerlen | Havoc | 4:00 |
| 7. | "U Make Me Wanna" (featuring Mariah Carey) | Phillips; Mariah Carey; Storch | Scott Storch | 4:53 |
| 8. | "Hot" (Skit) | Larry Troutman; Roger Troutman | Jadakiss | 0:18 |
| 9. | "Hot Sauce to Go" (featuring Pharrell) | Phillips; Pharrell Williams | The Neptunes | 3:56 |
| 10. | "Real Hip Hop" (featuring Sheek Louch) | Phillips; Sean Jacobs; Kasseem Dean; Curtis Mayfield | Swizz Beatz | 2:57 |
| 11. | "Shoot Outs" (featuring Styles P) | Phillips; David Styles; Anthony Parrino | Elite | 4:18 |
| 12. | "Still Feel Me" | Phillips; Alan Maman | Alchemist | 2:42 |
| 13. | "By Your Side" | Phillips; Robert Aton Adair, Jr.; Marilyn McLeod; Pam Sawyer | Baby Grand | 3:51 |
| 14. | "Gettin' It In" (featuring Kanye West) | Phillips; Kanye West | Kanye West | 3:37 |
| 15. | "Air It Out" | Phillips; Atkinson | Neo Da Matrix | 4:03 |
| 16. | "Welcome to D-Block" (performed by The LOX and Eminem) | Phillips; Marshall Mathers; Styles; Jacobs; Luis Resto; Steve King | Eminem; Luis Resto^{[a]} | 4:25 |
| 17. | "Kiss of Death" | Phillips; Andy Thelusma | Red Spyda | 3:12 |
| 18. | "I'm Goin Back" (featuring Nesha) | Phillips; Davis; Rhonesha Howerton; Wayne Lewis; David Lewis | Black Key | 3:37 |
| Total length: | | | | 62:54 |

Leftover tracks

- "The Champ Is Here"

Sample credits

- Track 6 contains samples from the composition "Mandrake" written by Pierre Moerlen and performed by Gong.
- Track 8 contains interpolations from the composition "I Wanna Be Your Man" written by Larry and Roger Troutman.
- Track 10 contains samples from the composition "Do Do Wap Is Strong In Here" written and performed by Curtis Mayfield.
- Track 13 contains samples from the composition "I'd Find You Anywhere" written by Pam Sawyer and Marilyn McLeod and performed by Creative Source.
- Track 18 contains excerpts from the composition "Secret Lovers" written by David E. Lewis and Wayne I. Lewis and performed by Atlantic Starr.

Notes

- ^{^[a]} signifies an additional producer.

== Personnel ==
- Jason "Jadakiss" Phillips – vocals, co-executive producer, A&R
- Aja Smith – additional vocals (track 2)
- Calvin "Snoop Dogg" Broadus – vocals (track 3)
- David "DJ Quik" Blake – vocals & recording (track 3)
- David "JellyRoll" Drew – additional vocals & producer (track 3)
- Saundralin "Mami Gunn" Green – additional vocals (track 3)
- Nathaniel "Nate Dogg" Hale – vocals (track 5)
- Anthony Hamilton – vocals (track 6)
- Mariah Carey – vocals (track 7)
- Pharrell Williams – vocals & producer (track 9)
- Sean "Sheek Louch" Jacobs – vocals (tracks: 10, 16)
- David "Styles P" Styles – vocals (tracks: 11, 16)
- Jason Spoor – additional vocals (track 11)
- Kanye West – vocals & producer (track 14)
- Marshall "Eminem" Mathers – vocals, producer & mixing (track 16)
- Ronesha Howard – vocals (track 18)
- Hanan Rubinstein – guitar (track 11)
- DP – scratches (track 11)
- Luis Resto – keyboards & additional producer (track 16)
- Steve King – guitar, recording & mixing (track 16)
- James "DJ Green Lantern" D'Agostino – producer, recording & mixing (track 1)
- Mickey "Black Key" Davis – producer (tracks: 2, 18)
- Qaadir "Neo Da Matrix" Atkinson – producer (tracks: 4, 15)
- Scott Storch – producer (tracks: 5, 7)
- Kejuan "Havoc" Muchita – producer (track 6)
- Kaseem "Swizz Beatz" Dean – producer (track 10)
- Anthony "Elite" Parrino – producer (track 11)
- Alan "The Alchemist" Maman – producer (track 12)
- Robert "Baby Grand" Adair – producer (track 13)
- Andy "Red Spyda" Thelusma – producer (track 17)
- Rene Antelmann – recording (tracks: 2, 17, 18)
- Dragan Čačinović – mixing (tracks: 2, 4, 5–8, 10–15, 17, 18), recording (tracks: 4, 5, 7–9, 11–16)
- Jason Schweitzer – recording & mixing (track 3)
- Randy Williams – recording (tracks: 3, 6, 7, 10, 16)
- Shon "Don" Brooks – recording (track 3)
- Rouble Kapoor – recording assistant (track 3)
- Jeremy MacKenzie – mixing assistant (track 3)
- Patrick Viala – mixing (track 9)
- Mike Strange – recording (track 16)
- Tony Dawsey – mastering
- Darrin "Dee" Dean – executive producer, A&R
- Joaquin "Waah" Dean – executive producer
- Alex Higdon – executive producer
- Jay "Icepick" Jackson – co-executive producer, A&R
- Drew FitzGerald – art direction, design
- Anthony Cutajar – photography
- Roger Ericson – photography
- Alimah Shamsid-Deen – A&R
- Ampora Sapp – A&R coordinator
- Craig Brodhead – A&R coordinator
- Mike Foster – A&R assistant
- Keiwanna Collins – A&R assistant

== Charts ==
=== Weekly charts ===
| Chart (2004) | Peak position |
|---|---|
| Canadian Albums (Nielsen SoundScan) | 15 |
| Canadian R&B Albums (Nielsen SoundScan) | 8 |
| French Albums (SNEP) | 139 |
| UK Albums (Official Charts) | 65 |
| UK R&B Albums (Official Charts) | 10 |
| US Billboard 200 | 1 |
| US Top R&B/Hip-Hop Albums (Billboard) | 1 |
| US Top Rap Albums (Billboard) | 1 |

=== Year-end charts ===
| Chart (2004) | Position |
|---|---|
| US Billboard 200 | 74 |
| US Top R&B/Hip-Hop Albums (Billboard) | 15 |

== Certifications ==
| Region | Certification | Certified units/sales |
|---|---|---|
| United States (RIAA) | Platinum | 1,000,000^{^} |
^{^} Shipments figures based on certification alone.

== See also ==
- List of Billboard 200 number-one albums of 2004
- List of Billboard number-one R&B/hip-hop albums of 2004
