= U Make Me Wanna (Jadakiss song) =

2004 single by Jadakiss featuring Mariah Carey

Single by Jadakiss featuring Mariah Carey

from the album Kiss of Death
- Released: October 12, 2004
- Recorded: 2004
- Studio: Powerhouse Studios (Yonkers, NY); Right Track Studios (New York, NY)
- Length: 4:54
- Label: Ruff Ryders; Interscope
- Songwriter(s): Jadakiss; Mariah Carey
- Producer(s): Scott Storch

Jadakiss singles chronology
| "Why" (2004) | "U Make Me Wanna" (2004) | "New York" (2004) |

Mariah Carey singles chronology
| "Bringin' On the Heartbreak" (2003) | "U Make Me Wanna" (2004) | "It's Like That" (2005) |

Music video
- "U Make Me Wanna" on YouTube

"U Make Me Wanna" is a song by New York rapper Jadakiss, released as the third and final single from his second studio album, Kiss of Death. The song features vocals by fellow New York singer-songwriter Mariah Carey, and was produced by Scott Storch. The lyrics tell a story detailing a man's daily effort of acquiring and selling substances such as cannabis or cocaine, and how he perseveres each day knowing that he has a beautiful, loving woman waiting on him at home each night, a woman who supports his work and even assists him. Carey's vocal range in the song reaches up to her sixth octave (whistle register).

== Critical reception ==
Billboard called the duet a highlight on the album. HipHopDX editor J-23 wrote: "it had disaster written all over it, but it is actually some really slick shit with a killer flute loop." Jon Caramanica of Rolling Stone wrote: "When he's (Jadakiss) undone, it's by tinkertoy production on tracks such as the insipid Mariah Carey vehicle 'U Make Me Wanna'". The Situation's Samantha Watson wrote: "Fans of Mariah Carey will like the track 'U Make Me Wanna', the distinctive Mariah vocals with Jadakiss laying down lyrics, the track plays on an Arabic like sound with added synthesised beats, not one of the best singles but it is one you can listen to." USA Today's Steve Jones called the song a "thug love anthem". Aqua Boogie of Vibe wrote that love themed "U Make Me Wanna" shows that Jada has more to offer than body counts and gun talk." Reviewing the album, RapReviews was favorable: "He even shows love for the ladies on the Mariah Carey-blessed 'U Make Me Wanna'. In 2020, Billboard ranked it as the 97th greatest song of Carey's career.

== Charts ==
=== Weekly charts ===
| Chart (2004) | Peak position |
|---|---|
| France (SNEP) | 55 |
| US Billboard Hot 100 | 21 |
| US Hot R&B/Hip-Hop Songs (Billboard) | 8 |
| US Hot Rap Songs (Billboard) | 9 |
| US Rhythmic (Billboard) | 34 |

=== Year-end charts ===
| Chart (2005) | Position |
|---|---|
| US Hot R&B/Hip-Hop Songs (Billboard) | 68 |

== Release history ==
| Region | Date | Format(s) | Label(s) | Ref. |
|---|---|---|---|---|
| United States | November 8, 2004 | Rhythmic contemporary · urban contemporary radio | Ruff Ryders, Interscope | |
