= Checkmate (Jadakiss song) =

2005 song by Jadakiss

Promotional single by Jadakiss
- Released: March 9, 2005
- Genre: Hip hop
- Length: 2:38
- Label: Ruff Ryders; Interscope
- Producer(s): The Alchemist

"Checkmate" is a song by the American rapper Jadakiss, released as a promotional single on March 9, 2005, by Ruff Ryders Entertainment/Interscope Records. The song uses the instrumental "Air It Out" from Big Noyd's album Only the Strong, produced by The Alchemist.

"Checkmate" is a diss track aimed at 50 Cent, a response to 50 Cent's diss track "Piggy Bank". "Checkmate" was in heavy rotation on hip-hop radio and reached number 56 on Billboard's Hot R&B/Hip-Hop Songs chart.

== Background ==
50 Cent had a feud with Ja Rule since 1999. In 2004, Jadakiss and Fat Joe appeared on Ja Rule's song "New York". 50 Cent saw it as them "helping" Ja Rule while 50 Cent was "destroying him", so he started feuding with them as well. 50 Cent's second album, The Massacre, was released on March 3, 2005. The album included the song "Piggy Bank" which contained mentions of a number of rappers 50 Cent had feuds with, including Jadakiss.

According to Jadakiss, initially he was not interested in feuding with 50 Cent. "That was really a lot of media hyping it up", he said to Vibe magazine. He changed his mind once people, including his friends, started asking whether or not he had heard "Piggy Bank" and if he will respond to it. Jadakiss decided to use instrumental "Air It Out" from Big Noyd's album Only the Strong, produced by The Alchemist. 50 Cent previously used this instrumental for his Murder Inc. diss song "I'm an Animal".

== Lyrics ==
"Checkmate"
Jadakiss accuses 50 Cent of revealing too much in his song "Ghetto Qur'an", which, he believes, ultimately led to the arrest of Supreme. Numerous publications applauded Jadakiss for the lines "Yeah, you got a felony, but you ain't a predicate / Never the King of New York, you live in Connecticut".

"Checkmate" is a diss song, written with the goal to verbally attack 50 Cent. Jadakiss starts the song by congratulating 50 Cent on selling 1.1 million copies of his album The Massacre in one week. Then, the first and only verse of the song starts. In the verse, Jadakiss raps about 50 Cent's perceived weaknesses and shortcomings, including alleged snitching and his lack of originality. Jadakiss points out the assassination attempt being the primary theme of 50 Cent's lyrics, while simultaneously making fun of it by rapping "You had to get shot nine times to be rich" and "Since when has it become cool to get shot and not shoot back?". In the song, Jadakiss mentions the mansion in Connecticut owned by 50 Cent, asserting that one cannot be "the King of New York" while living there. Later in the song he also questions 50 Cent's lyrical abilities as a rapper, comparing him to other G-Unit members, and tells him to "just sell clothes and sneakers". According to XXL magazine, by mentioning 50 Cent's friends and business ventures, "Jada created the impression that he knew his nemesis inside and out".

== Release ==
"Checkmate" was released on March 9, 2005, a few hours after a press conference where 50 Cent announced the end of his feud with rapper The Game. Released as a promotional single on Ruff Ryders Entertainment/Interscope Records, the song was premiered later that day along with Fat Joe's "My FoFo" on DJ Funkmaster Flex's radio show on Hot 97.

According to Slate, after the release, "Checkmate" was in heavy rotation on hip-hop radio. The song appeared on Billboard's Hot R&B/Hip-Hop Songs chart, where it peaked at number 56. The success of the song allowed Jadakiss to go on tour, where he would perform the song. "Checkmate" was later included on the live album Jadakiss: Kiss Of Death – Tour 2005.

== Legacy ==
50 Cent and Jadakiss continued to release diss tracks aimed at each other throughout the year, until they ended the feud when 50 Cent visited Jadakiss' studio and they spent a few hours talking to each other. According to Jadakiss, he made "a lot of money" off the feud. In 2011, he claimed the feud was "just a good marketing tool for 50 and his second album".

In 2022, XXL magazine described the song as an "exercise in concision and rhyme technique" and called it "one of the very best clapbacks in rap history". The Ringer placed "Checkmate" at number 11 on their list of the greatest diss tracks of all time, stating that "Jadakiss defeated him by reminding people that there was a reason why 50 was initially blackballed, that there was a reason real street dudes wanted him gone". The website's writer Jayson Buford viewed the song as the beginning of "50 Cent's transition into a wrestling heel–like celebrity who used to be a rapper".

== Chart performance ==
Chart (2005)	Peak position
US Hot R&B/Hip-Hop Songs (Billboard)	56
