= We Gonna Make It =

Single by Jadakiss featuring Styles P

Single by Jadakiss featuring Styles P

from the album Kiss tha Game Goodbye
- Released: 2001
- Genre: East Coast hip hop
- Length: 3:33
- Label: Ruff Ryders; Interscope
- Songwriters: Jason Phillips; David Styles; Alan Maman
- Producer: The Alchemist

Jadakiss singles chronology
"Fast Lane (Remix)" (2001)	"We Gonna Make It" (2001)	"Knock Yourself Out" (2001)

Styles P singles chronology
"Ruff Ryders' Anthem (Remix)" (1998)	"We Gonna Make It" (2001)	"Good Times" (2002)

Music video
- "We Gonna Make It" on YouTube

"We Gonna Make It" is a song by American rapper Jadakiss. It is the lead single from his debut studio album Kiss tha Game Goodbye (2001), and features American rapper Styles P. The song was produced by The Alchemist, and contains a sample of "My Music" by musician Samuel Jonathan Johnson.

The official remix of the song was released later in 2001, and features American rapper Eve.

== Background ==
When the Alchemist finished producing the instrumental of the song, he first played it for DJ Premier, who liked it. Rapper Nas was originally intended to record a song with the instrumental, but he did not. Jay-Z also heard the beat, but passed as well. In 1999, the Alchemist supplied the beat to rapper Ras Kass and claims he was paid for the first half of the money for the instrumental.

=== Controversy ===
The Alchemist claims he later attempted to receive the second half of his payment, but Ras Kass's record label Priority Records was not responding to him, so he began showcasing the beat to other artists (which he later informed Ras Kass about). Jadakiss had expressed interest in rapping to the beat, and recorded "We Gonna Make It". When the song was released, Ras Kass took issue with The Alchemist selling the beat to Jadakiss, since he had already recorded his song "Home Sweet Home" over it, leading to a feud between Ras Kass and The Alchemist.

== Live performances ==
On November 11, 2021, Jadakiss and Styles P joined Alicia Keys at the Apollo Theater and performed the song with her.

== Charts ==
Chart (2001)	Peak position
US Hot R&B/Hip-Hop Songs (Billboard)	53
US Hot Rap Songs (Billboard)	5
