= Kiss tha Game Goodbye =

Studio album by Jadakiss
- Released: August 7, 2001
- Genres: Hip-hop; gangsta rap
- Length: 76:39
- Labels: Interscope; Ruff Ryders
- Producers: Icepick (also exec.); The Alchemist; Chucky Thompson; DJ Premier; DJ Shok; Eric McCaine; Fiend; Grimy; Jadakiss; Just Blaze; Mahogany; Mas; The Neptunes; P.K.; Rated R; Sheek; Swizz Beatz; Timbaland; Wayne-O/ Whateva

Jadakiss chronology
Kiss tha Game Goodbye (2001)	Kiss of Death (2004)

Singles from Kiss tha Game Goodbye
- 1. "We Gonna Make It" Released: 2001; 2. "Knock Yourself Out" Released: 2001; 3. "Put Ya Hands Up" Released: 2001

Professional ratings
Review scores
Source	Rating
AllMusic	3/5 stars
The A.V. Club	(average)
Entertainment Weekly	C
HipHopDX	4/5 stars
RapReviews	6/10
Robert Christgau	(choice cut)
Rolling Stone	3.5/5 stars
The Source	4/5 stars
Stylus Magazine	D−
USA Today	3/4 stars

Kiss tha Game Goodbye is the debut studio album by American rapper Jadakiss. Originally scheduled for an April 18th, 2000 release, the album was ultimately released on August 7, 2001, by Interscope Records and Ruff Ryders. The album debuted at number five on the US Billboard 200 and number two on the Top R&B/Hip-Hop Albums chart.

The album was produced by high profile producers such as The Alchemist, Timbaland and DJ Premier, amongst others and features guest vocals from Eric Mccaine, Antoine Stanton, Nas, Styles P, Sheek Louch, Big Will, Cross, Icepick Parie, Carl Thomas, Swizz Beatz, Snoop Dogg, Nate Dogg, Mashonda, Drag-On, Eve, Infa-Red & Cross, Fiend, 8Ball, Yung Wun, DMX and Ann Nesby. It contains three singles.

== Commercial performance ==
The album debuted at number five on the US Billboard 200 selling 204,000 copies in its first week. It was eventually certified gold by the Recording Industry Association of America (RIAA) for sales of over 500,000 copies in the United States. As of June 2004, the album has sold 877,000 copies.

== Track listing ==
No.	Title	Writer(s)	Featured artist(s)	Length
1.	"Intro"			0:57
2.	"Jada's Got a Gun"	Jason Phillips; Kasseem Dean; Eric McCaine	Eric McCaine; Antoine Stanton	4:27
3.	"Show Discipline"	Phillips; Nasir Jones; David Styles; Imsomie Leeper; James VanLeer; Bobby Rush	Nas	3:39
4.	"Knock Yourself Out" (produced by The Neptunes)	Phillips; Pharrell Williams; Chad Hugo		3:32
5.	"We Gonna Make It" (produced by The Alchemist)	Phillips; Styles; Alan Maman	Styles P	3:33
6.	"None of Y'all Betta"	Phillips; Styles; Sean Jacobs; Christopher Martin	Styles P; Sheek Louch	3:37
7.	"Stick Yourself" (skit)		Big Will; Cross; Icepick	1:49
8.	"I'm a Gangsta"	Phillips; Anthony Fields	Parle	3:30
9.	"Nasty Girl"	Phillips; Timothy Mosley; Paul Laurence	Carl Thomas	3:57
10.	"Put Ya Hands Up" (produced by Wayne-O/ Whateva)	Phillips; Shandel Green; Wayne Brown; Deke Richards		3:27
11.	"Jay Jerkin'" (skit)		Styles P; Sheek Louch	2:42
12.	"On My Way"	Phillips; Dean	Swizz Beatz	4:21
13.	"Cruisin'"	Phillips; Michael Gomez; Calvin Broadus	Snoop Dogg	3:55
14.	"Kiss Is Spittin'"	Phillips; Dean; McCaine; Jerry Leiber; Mike Stoller	Nate Dogg; Mashonda	3:55
15.	"Fuckin' or What?"	Phillips; Styles; Dean; Linda Creed; Thom Bell		3:42
16.	"It's Time I See You"	Phillips; Styles; Justin Smith; Jacobs; Eve Jeffers; Melvin Smalls; Green; Shawn Martin	Styles P; Sheek Louch; Drag-On; Eve; Infa-Red & Cross	4:11
17.	"What You Ride For?"	Phillips; Richard Jones; James Anderson; Premro Smith	Fiend; 8Ball; Yung Wun	4:30
18.	"Uh-Hunh!"	Phillips; Earl Simmons; Thomas Weisman; Ralphy Solas Jr.	DMX	4:22
19.	"Feel Me"	Phillips; Maman		2:00
20.	"Keep Ya Head Up"	Phillips; Leeper; Chucky Thompson; James Harris III; Terry Lewis; Gary Hines	Ann Nesby	5:27
21.	"Charge It" (skit)			5:06
Total length:				76:39

== Personnel ==
- Swizz Beatz - production (2, 12, 15); co-production (14)
- Icepick - production (1, 7, 11)
- Mahogany - production (3, 20)
- The Alchemist - production (5, 19)
- Jadakiss - production (11, 21)
- The Neptunes - production (4)
- DJ Premier - production (6)
- Grimy - production (7)
- P.K. - production (8)
- Timbaland - production (9)
- Wayne-O - production (10)
- Sheek - production (11)
- DJ Shok - production (13)
- Eric McCaine - production (14)
- Just Blaze - production (16)
- Fiend - production (17)
- Rated R - production (18)
- Mas - production (18)
- Chucky Thompson - production (20)

== Charts ==
=== Weekly charts ===
Chart (2001)	Peak position
Canadian Albums (Nielsen SoundScan)	28
UK Albums (Official Charts)	90
UK R&B Albums (Official Charts)	17
US Billboard 200	5
US Top R&B/Hip-Hop Albums (Billboard)	2

=== Year-end charts ===
Chart (2001)	Position
Canadian R&B Albums (Nielsen SoundScan)	87
US Billboard 200	127
US Top R&B/Hip-Hop Albums (Billboard)	46

== Certifications ==
Region	Certification	Certified units/sales
United States (RIAA)	Gold	877,000
