= Niko Is =

American rapper

NIKO IS
- Born: Nikolai Paiva; June 10, 1988 (age 37); Rio de Janeiro, Brazil
- Origin: Orlando, Florida, U.S.
- Genres: Hip hop; samba; bossa nova
- Occupations: Rapper; songwriter; record producer
- Years active: 2010–present
- Label: Javotti Media
- Website: itscolours.com

Nikolai Paiva (born June 10, 1988), better known by his stage name Niko Is (stylized as NIKO IS), is a Brazilian-American hip hop recording artist born in Rio de Janeiro, Brazil. Currently based in Orlando, Florida, he is signed to Talib Kweli's Javotti Media. Niko's catalogue includes projects like Chill Cosby and the Good Blood LP, which were both released to generally positive reviews and moderate success. His Javotti Media debut, Brutus, was produced by frequent collaborator, Thanks Joey and was released to critical acclaim on February 4, 2015.

== Early life ==
Nikolai Paiva was born in Rio de Janeiro, Brazil, his mother's home country. The two moved to Florida when Niko was seven years of age. Niko began showing an interest in music while attending Dr. Phillips High School in Orlando, where he began working with record producer, Thanks Joey. The duo released a number of popular singles and mixtapes. Niko was known in school for performing spontaneous freestyle rap and drawing crowds. After high school, Niko pursued his music career and developed a style influenced by an assortment of genres, from hip hop and funk to jazz and bossa nova.

== Career ==
=== 2012 - Chill Cosby ===
In 2012 Niko Is independently released Chill Cosby. The mixtape was well received locally and would help Niko garner a strong internet buzz. The single, "Steffi Graf" featuring Action Bronson, was featured on popular websites such as HipHopDX, 2DopeBoyz, Complex Magazine and others. The independent project landed Niko an interview with Vibe Magazine and aligned him with regional tastemakers, such as DJ Smallz and Ayo the Producer.

=== 2013 - Good Blood LP ===
Good Blood, a precursor to his long awaited Brutus project, was Niko's first release in 2014. The title is the literal English translation of the Brazilian term, 'Sangue Bom' and Niko says that he created many characters in the album to be direct representations of his culture. Good Blood was entirely produced by Thanks Joey with the exception of the self-produced "Onda". The project received positive reviews, with Orlando Weekly commenting, "Bigger than his fro and a clear level up, Good Blood is the sound of an artist hitting major-league stride." In May 2013, Niko recorded a song with industry veteran, Talib Kweli, for his Brutus project. Kweli then developed an interest in Niko's career and had asked him to join his recently formed Javotti Media label.

=== Brutus - Present ===
Niko released Brutus, with longtime collaborator, Thanks Joey. The album was released through Javotti Media and features Talib Kweli and other notable artists. upon release of the album Dan-O writing for Freemusicempire passionately presented praise for the album "Niko is less silly on Brutus (still very silly) and more focused on rapping himself into history. I always think of it as that Reasonable Doubt mindstate; that album is special because you can feel Jay saying “if this is my one shot I’ve got to tell you everything” and this is Niko’s statement."

Since the release of Brutus, along with his creative-partner, Thanks Joey, Niko has been working extensively with Colours of the Culture, a global collective of visual artists and musicians. Colours released their first collaborative project, Roy G Biv: What a Colorful World in October 2015. The album features guest appearances from Talib Kweli, Styles P, Niko Is and other Colours of the Culture affiliates.

Niko Is appeared on four songs on Talib Kweli & 9th Wonder's collaborative effort, Indie 500, released in November 2015.

== Discography ==
=== Mixtapes ===
List of albums, with selected details
Title	Album details
Chill Cosby	Released: December 3, 2012; Format: Free download; Label: Self-released
Good Blood LP	Released: March 10, 2013; Format: Free download; Label: Self-released

=== Albums ===
List of albums, with selected details
Title	Album details
Brutus	Released: February 4, 2015; Format: Physical & Digital; Label: Javotti Media
Uniko	Released: November 30, 2018; Format: Physical & Digital; Label: Javotti Media
Good Air	Released: April 20, 2020; Format: Physical & Digital; Label: Colours Of The Culture

=== Extended plays ===
List of albums, with selected details
Title	Album details
Poncho	Released: December 25, 2019; Format: Digital; Label: Javotti Media
Amor in Abundance	Released: September 11, 2023; Format: Digital; Label: Colours Of The Culture

=== Collaboration albums ===
List of albums, with selected details
Title	Album details
Sofrito 2020 (with El Bles)	Released: August 18, 2020; Format: Digital; Label: Porta Riches, LLC
88 Days a Week (with California Terry)	Released: March 26, 2021; Format: Physical & Digital; Label: Everybody Gaines
Sofrito SZN (with El Bles)	Released: December 16, 2021; Format: Digital; Label: Colours of the Culture
The Adventures Of The Young Viejos (with Juni Ali)	Released: October 7, 2022; Format: Digital; Label: Javotti Media
Turn Off the Algorithm, Vol. 4 (with HenryDaher)	Released: April 29, 2024; Format: Digital; Label: Pollen8 Music LLC
The Optimist's Son (with J. Rawls)	Released: October 24, 2025; Format: Digital; Label: Javotti Media

=== Collaboration extended plays ===
List of albums, with selected details
Title	Album details
Tres Leches (with Trll Kennedy & CreativAngel)	Released: May 28, 2021; Format: Digital; Label: Tier 1 Music
88 Hours (with California Terry)	Released: January 17, 2025; Format: Digital; Label: Everybody Gaines
