= DMX discography =

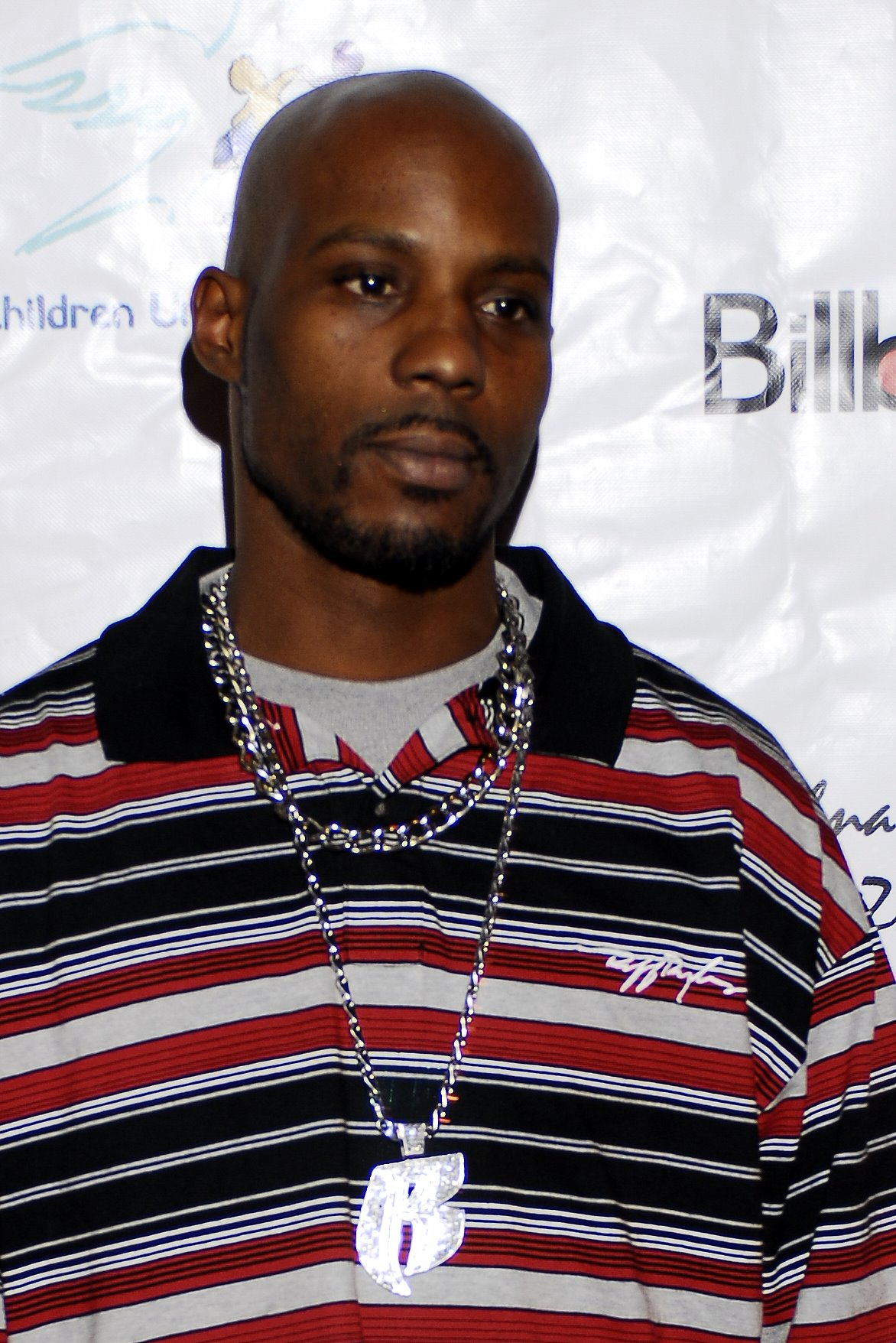
- DMX in 2007, at the after party for the 79th Academy Awards
- Studio albums: 8
- Extended plays: 2
- Compilation albums: 7
- Singles: 47
- Music videos: 25
- Mixtapes: 3

American rapper DMX released eight studio albums, seven compilation albums, three mixtapes, 47 singles (including 17 as a featured artist) and 24 music videos.

In 1998, DMX released his debut studio album, It's Dark and Hell Is Hot, peaking at number 1 on the Billboard 200 and being certified 4× Platinum. In the same year, DMX's second album Flesh of My Flesh, Blood of My Blood achieved similar success, selling 3.5 million copies to date. From 1998 to 2003, DMX released five consecutive number 1 albums, including the former two as well as ... And Then There Was X (1999), The Great Depression (2001) and Grand Champ (2003). Eleven of DMX's solo singles charted on the Billboard Hot 100, including "Ruff Ryders' Anthem", "What's My Name?", "What These Bitches Want", and "Party Up (Up in Here)".

As of June 2014, DMX became the fifth best-selling rap or hip-hop artist of the Nielsen SoundScan era in the United States, with the sales of 23.3 million albums.

== Albums ==
=== Studio albums ===
List of studio albums, with selected chart positions, sales figures and certifications
Title	Album details	Peak chart positions										Sales figures	Certifications
Title	Album details	US	US R&B/ HH	AUS	CAN	GER	IRL	NLD	NZ	SWI	UK	Sales figures	Certifications
It's Dark and Hell Is Hot	Released: May 19, 1998; Label: Ruff Ryders, Def Jam; Format: CD, LP, cassette, digital download	1	1	—	15	—	—	—	—	—	89	US: 4,800,000	RIAA: 4× Platinum; BPI: Gold; MC: Platinum
Flesh of My Flesh, Blood of My Blood	Released: December 22, 1998; Label: Ruff Ryders, Def Jam; Format: CD, LP, cassette, digital download	1	1	—	42	61	—	—	—	—	119	US: 3,500,000	RIAA: 3× Platinum; BPI: Gold; MC: Gold
... And Then There Was X	Released: December 21, 1999; Label: Ruff Ryders, Def Jam; Format: CD, LP, cassette, digital download	1	1	—	6	46	—	64	—	—	108	US: 4,900,000 (Note: Sales figures as of November 17, 2009.)	RIAA: 5× Platinum; BPI: Gold; MC: Platinum
The Great Depression	Released: October 23, 2001; Label: Ruff Ryders, Def Jam; Format: CD, LP, cassette, digital download	1	1	99	1	10	26	25	38	60	20	US: 1,862,000	RIAA: Platinum; BPI: Gold; MC: Platinum
Grand Champ	Released: September 16, 2003; Label: Ruff Ryders, Def Jam; Format: CD, LP, cassette, digital download	1	1	32	2	6	8	28	7	10	6	US: 1,204,000	RIAA: Platinum; BPI: Gold; MC: Platinum
Year of the Dog... Again	Released: August 1, 2006; Label: Ruff Ryders, Sony Urban Music, Columbia; Format: CD, LP, digital download	2	1	70	4	7	15	70	37	7	22	US: 346,000	
Undisputed	Released: September 11, 2012; Label: Seven Arts, Fontana; Format: CD, digital download	19	2	—	—	—	—	—	—	—	—		
Exodus	Released: May 28, 2021; Label: Ruff Ryders, Bloodline, Def Jam; Format: CD, digital download	8	4	—	26	—	—	—	—	36	—		
"—" denotes a recording that did not chart or was not released in that territory.

=== Compilation albums ===
List of compilation albums, with selected chart positions and certifications
Title	Album details	Peak chart positions					Certifications
Title	Album details	US	US R&B/ HH	US Rap	CAN	UK	Certifications
The Definition of X: The Pick of the Litter	Released: June 12, 2007; Label: Ruff Ryders, Def Jam; Format: CD, LP, digital download	26	7	3	—	174	BPI: Silver
Playlist Your Way	Released: February 24, 2009; Label: Ruff Ryders, Def Jam; Format: CD, LP, digital download	—	—	—	—	—	
The Best of DMX	Released: January 26, 2010; Label: Ruff Ryders, Def Jam; Format: CD, LP, digital download	2	1	1	3	12	BPI: Gold
Greatest Hits with a Twist	Released: March 22, 2011; Label: X-Ray; Format: CD, LP, digital download	—	—	—	—	—	
Icon	Released: May 1, 2012; Label: Def Jam; Format: CD, digital download	—	28	13	—	—	
Redemption of the Beast	Released: January 13, 2015; Label: Seven Arts, Fontana; Format: CD, digital download	—	—	—	—	—	
DMX: The Ruff Ryder	Released: April 9, 2021; Label: Def Jam; Format: Digital download	—	—	—	—	—	

== Mixtapes ==
List of mixtapes, with selected chart positions
Title	Mixtape details	Peak chart positions		
Title	Mixtape details	US Ind.	US R&B/ HH	US Rap
Here We Go Again The Mixtape	Released: 2005; Label: Bloodline; Format: CD, digital download	—	—	—
Mixtape	Released: March 23, 2010; Label: Siccness; Format: CD, digital download	46	46	20
The Weigh In	Released: May 15, 2012; Label: Bloodline; Format: CD, digital download	—	—	—

== Extended plays ==
- A Dog's Prayers (2021)
- Let Us Pray: Chapter X (2024)

== Singles ==
=== As lead artist ===
List of singles as lead artist, with selected chart positions and certifications, showing year released and album name
Title	Year	Peak chart positions									Certifications	Album
Title	Year	US	US R&B/ HH	US Rap	AUS	AUT	GER	IRL	SWI	UK	Certifications	Album
"Get at Me Dog" (featuring Sheek Louch)	1998	39	19	6	—	—	—	—	—	—	RIAA: Gold	It's Dark and Hell Is Hot
"Stop Being Greedy"	1998	79	45	8	—	—	—	—	—	—		It's Dark and Hell Is Hot
"Ruff Ryders' Anthem"	1998	16	8	7	—	—	—	—	—	—	RIAA: 2× Platinum; BPI: Silver; RMNZ: Platinum	It's Dark and Hell Is Hot
"How's It Goin' Down" (featuring Faith Evans)	1998	70	19	—	—	—	—	—	—	—	RIAA: Gold	It's Dark and Hell Is Hot
"Grand Finale" (featuring Ja Rule, Method Man and Nas)	1998	— (Note: "Grand Finale" did not enter the Billboard Hot 100, but peaked at number 17 on the Bubbling Under Hot 100 Singles chart.)	63	18	—	—	—	—	—	—		Belly soundtrack
"Slippin'"	1998	—	60	—	—	—	—	—	—	30	RIAA: Platinum	Flesh of My Flesh, Blood of My Blood
"No Love 4 Me" (featuring Drag-On and Swizz Beatz)	1999	—	— (Note: "No Love 4 Me" did not enter the Hot R&B/Hip-Hop Songs chart, but peaked at number seven on the Bubbling Under R&B/Hip-Hop Singles chart.)	—	—	—	—	—	—	—		Flesh of My Flesh, Blood of My Blood
"What's My Name?"	1999	67	23	11	—	—	—	—	—	—	RIAA: Gold	...And Then There Was X
"What These Bitches Want" (featuring Sisqó)	2000	49	11	22	—	—	—	—	—	—	RIAA: Gold	...And Then There Was X
"Party Up (Up in Here)"	2000	27	8	11	—	—	—	—	—	—	RIAA: 3× Platinum; BPI: Gold; RMNZ: Platinum	...And Then There Was X
"Don't You Ever"	2000	—	57	—	—	—	—	—	—	—		...And Then There Was X
"No Sunshine"	2001	—	67	—	—	—	—	—	—	—		Exit Wounds soundtrack
"We Right Here"	2001	— (Note: "We Right Here" did not enter the Billboard Hot 100, but peaked at number 17 on the Bubbling Under Hot 100 Singles chart.)	43	8	—	—	62	—	—	—		The Great Depression
"Who We Be"	2001	60	16	10	—	—	—	38	—	34		The Great Depression
"I Miss You" (featuring Faith Evans)	2002	86	37	—	—	—	87	—	—	—		The Great Depression
"X Gon' Give It to Ya"	2003	46	21	13	54	62	23	18	14	6	RIAA: 2× Platinum; BPI: 2× Platinum; RMNZ: 2× Platinum	Cradle 2 the Grave soundtrack
"Where the Hood At?"	2003	68	24	13	—	—	29	18	26	16	RIAA: Platinum; BPI: Gold; RMNZ: Platinum	Grand Champ
"Get It on the Floor" (featuring Swizz Beatz)	2003	—	57	—	—	54	43	39	26	34		Grand Champ
"Give 'Em What They Want"	2005	—	— (Note: "Give 'Em What They Want" did not enter the Hot R&B/Hip-Hop Songs chart, but peaked at number 25 on the Bubbling Under R&B/Hip-Hop Singles chart.)	—	—	—	—	—	—	—		Year of the Dog... Again
"We in Here" (featuring Swizz Beatz)	2006	—	— (Note: "We in Here" did not enter the Hot R&B/Hip-Hop Songs chart, but peaked at number 25 on the Bubbling Under R&B/Hip-Hop Singles chart.)	—	—	—	—	—	—	—		Year of the Dog... Again
"Lord Give Me a Sign"	2006	— (Note: "Lord Give Me a Sign" did not enter the Billboard Hot 100, but peaked at number 22 on the Bubbling Under Hot 100 Singles chart.)	70	—	—	—	31	—	65	111		Year of the Dog... Again
"The Boy Go Off" (with Big Sha)	2010	—	—	—	—	—	—	—	—	—		Non-album single
"I Don't Dance" (featuring Machine Gun Kelly)	2012	—	—	—	—	—	—	—	—	—		Undisputed
"Head Up"	2012	—	—	—	—	—	—	—	—	—		Undisputed
"Don't Call Me" (with Rakim, featuring Shontelle and Aleks D.)	2013	—	—	—	—	—	—	—	—	—		Non-album singles
"Still Scratching" (featuring Styles P)	2016	—	—	—	—	—	—	—	—	—		Non-album singles
"Blood Red"	2016	—	—	—	—	—	—	—	—	—		Non-album singles
"Get It Get It" (with Savant, featuring Snoop Dogg)	2016	—	—	—	—	—	—	—	—	—		Non-album singles
"Bane Iz Back" (featuring Swizz Beatz)	2017	—	—	—	—	—	—	—	—	—		Non-album singles
"X Moves" (featuring Bootsy Collins, Steve Howe and Ian Paice)	2021	—	—	—	—	—	—	—	—	—		Non-album singles
"Been to War" (with Swizz Beatz and French Montana)	2021	—	—	—	—	—	—	—	—	—		Godfather of Harlem
"Bring Out the Worst" (featuring Joyner Lucas)	2025	—	—	—	—	—	—	—	—	—		TBA
"—" denotes a recording that did not chart or was not released in that territory.

=== As featured artist ===
List of singles as featured artist, with selected chart positions and certifications, showing year released and album name
Title	Year	Peak chart positions									Certifications	Album
Title	Year	US	US R&B/ HH	US Rap	US Rhyth.	US Main.	NLD	NZ	UK	UK R&B	Certifications	Album
"4, 3, 2, 1" (LL Cool J featuring Canibus, DMX, Master P, Method Man and Redman)	1997	75	24	10	—	—	—	—	—	—		Phenomenon
"Money, Power & Respect" (The Lox featuring DMX and Lil' Kim)	1998	17	8	1	36	—	—	45	—	—	RIAA: Gold	Money, Power & Respect
"Shut 'Em Down" (Onyx featuring DMX)	1998	— (Note: "Shut 'em Down" did not enter the Billboard Hot 100, but peaked at number seven on the Bubbling Under Hot 100 Singles chart.)	61	43	—	—	—	—	136	—		Shut 'Em Down
"Watcha Gonna Do?" (Jayo Felony featuring DMX and Method Man)	1998	—	—	—	—	—	—	—	—	—		Whatcha Gonna Do? and Hav Plenty (soundtrack)
"It's On" (DJ Clue? featuring DMX)	1998	(Note: "It's On" did not enter the Billboard Hot 100, but peaked at number 11 on the Bubbling Under Hot 100 Singles chart.)	39		38	—	—	—	—			The Professional
"Ryde or Die" (Ruff Ryders featuring DMX, The LOX & Eve)	1999											Ryde or Die Vol. 1
"Money, Cash, Hoes" (Jay-Z featuring DMX)	1999	— (Note: "Money, Cash, Hoes" did not enter the Billboard Hot 100, but peaked at number 16 on the Bubbling Under Hot 100 Singles chart.)	36	19	—	—	—	—	—	—		Vol. 2... Hard Knock Life
"Come Back in One Piece" (Aaliyah featuring DMX)	2000	— (Note: "Come Back in One Piece" did not enter the Billboard Hot 100, but peaked at number 17 on the Bubbling Under Hot 100 Singles chart.)	36	—	39	—	59	—	—	—		Romeo Must Die soundtrack
"Do You" (Funkmaster Flex featuring DMX)	2000	91	34	21	—	—	—	—	—	—		The Mix Tape, Vol. IV
"Put Your Drinks Down" (Drag-On featuring DMX, Eve, Jadakiss, Birdman and TQ)	2003	—	80	—	—	—	—	—	—	—		Hell and Back
"Tear It Up" (Yung Wun featuring DMX, Lil' Flip and David Banner)	2004	76	39	21	26	—	—	—	—	—		The Dirtiest Thirstiest
"Innocent Man" (Mark Morrison featuring DMX)	2006	—	—	—	—	—	—	—	46	14		Innocent Man
"A Song for You" (Bizzy Bone featuring DMX and Chris Notez)	2008	—	61	—	—	—	—	—	—	—		A Song for You
"Electrolytes" (N.O.R.E. featuring Macy Gray and DMX)	2011	—	—	—	—	—	—	—	—	—		Scared Money
"Tell Ya Friends" (N.O.4 featuring DMX and Dani Stevenson)	2012	—	— (Note: "Tell Ya Friends" did not enter the Hot R&B/Hip-Hop Songs chart, but peaked at number 21 on the Bubbling Under R&B/Hip-Hop Singles chart.)	—	—	—	—	—	—	—		The Beginning
"Faith" (Omar Wilson featuring DMX)	2013	—	—	—	—	—	—	—	—	—		Non-album singles
"Meltdown" (N.A.S.A. featuring DMX and Priyanka Chopra)	2015	—	—	—	—	—	—	—	—	—		Non-album singles
"Kant Nobody" (Lil Wayne featuring DMX)	2023	66	23	11	—	—	—	—	—	—		I Am Music
"This Is the Way" (Five Finger Death Punch featuring DMX)	2024	—	—	—	—	1	—	—	—	—		AfterLife (Deluxe Edition)
"—" denotes a recording that did not chart or was not released in that territory.

== Other charted and certified songs ==
List of other charted and certified songs, with selected chart positions, showing year released and album name
Title	Year	Peak chart positions				Certifications	Album
Title	Year	US Bub.	US R&B/ HH	US Rhyth.	NZ Hot	Certifications	Album
"Ryde or Die" (with The Lox, Drag-On and Eve)	1999	—	— (Note: "Ryde or Die" did not enter the Hot R&B/Hip-Hop Songs chart, but peaked at number 15 on the Bubbling Under R&B/Hip-Hop Singles chart.)	—	—		Ryde or Die Vol. 1
"Sincerity" (Mary J. Blige featuring Nas and DMX)	1999	—	72	—	—		Mary
"Rollin' (Urban Assault Vehicle)" (Limp Bizkit featuring DMX, Redman and Method Man)	2000	—	— (Note: "Rollin' (Urban Assault Vehicle)" did not enter the Hot R&B/Hip-Hop Songs chart, but peaked at number 19 on the Bubbling Under R&B/Hip-Hop Singles chart.)	38	—		Chocolate Starfish and the Hot Dog Flavored Water
"Go to Sleep" (Eminem featuring Obie Trice and DMX)	2002	—	—	—	—	ARIA: Gold	Cradle 2 the Grave
"King Thing"	2004	—	86	—	—		Never Die Alone
"Bath Salts" (featuring Jay-Z and Nas)	2021	11	—	—	38		Exodus
"—" denotes a recording that did not chart or was not released in that territory.

== Guest appearances ==
List of non-single guest appearances, with other performing artists, showing year released and album name
Title	Year	Other artist(s)	Album
"Inner City Blues"	1995	Pudgee Tha Phat Bastard	Non-album songs
"You Ain't Know"	1995	Pudgee Tha Phat Bastard, Ran Reed	Non-album songs
"Time to Build"	1995	Mic Geronimo, Ja Rule, Jay-Z	The Natural
"If It's On, It's On"	1995	Cash Money Click, Jay-Z, Black Child	Non-album song
"Represent Nigga"	1995	Cash Money Click, Black Child	Non-album song
"Usual Suspects"	1997	Mic Geronimo, Hussein Fatal, Ja Rule, Cormega	How to Be a Player soundtrack and Vendetta
"Nothin' Move But the Money" (Remix)	1997	Mic Geronimo, Black Rob	Non-album song
"Take What's Yours"	1997	Mase	Harlem World
"24 Hrs. to Live"	1997	Mase, The Lox, Black Rob	Harlem World
"We Be Clubbin'" (Clark World Remix)	1998	Ice Cube	The Players Club soundtrack
"Pure Uncut" (Remix)	1998	8ball, Herb McGruff, Canibus	Non-album song
"Murdergram"	1998	Jay-Z, Ja Rule	Streets Is Watching soundtrack
"We Got This"	1998	John Forté	Poly Sci
"Get Your Shit Right"	1998	Jermaine Dupri, The Madd Rapper	Life in 1472
"Freestyle Over "Give Up the Goods (Just Step)""	1998	Funkmaster Flex	The Mix Tape, Vol. III
"Top Shotter"	1998	Sean Paul, Mr. Vegas	Belly soundtrack
"Nowhere to Run"	1998	Ozzy Osbourne, Ol' Dirty Bastard, The Crystal Method, Fuzzbubble	Chef Aid: The South Park Album
"Pull It"	1998	Cam'Ron	—N/a
"Ruff Ryders' Anthem (Remix)"	1998	DJ Clue?, Jadakiss, Styles P, Drag-On, Eve	The Professional
"Dog & A Fox"	1999	Foxy Brown	Chyna Doll
"Life Is What You Make It"	1999	Nas	I Am...
"Ryde or Die"	1999	The Luniz, Drag-On	Turf Stories soundtrack
"Bug Out"	1999	None	Ryde or Die Vol. 1
"Some X Shit"	1999	None	Ryde or Die Vol. 1
"It's Murda"	1999	Ja Rule, Jay-Z	Venni Vetti Vecci
"The Story"	1999	None	Black Gangster soundtrack
"I Can, I Can"	1999	None	The Wood soundtrack
"Sincerity"	1999	Mary J. Blige, Nas	Mary
"Scenario 2000"	1999	Eve, The Lox, Drag-On	Let There Be Eve...Ruff Ryders' First Lady
"Dog Match"	1999	Eve	Let There Be Eve...Ruff Ryders' First Lady
"Catz Don't Know"	1999	None	Light It Up soundtrack
"Tales from the Darkside"	2000	None	Irv Gotti Presents: The Murderers
"Niggas Die 4 Me"	2000	Drag-On	Opposite of H2O
"Get It Right"	2000	Drag-On	Opposite of H2O
"Why We Die"	2000	Busta Rhymes, Jay-Z	Anarchy
"I'm Gonna Crawl"	2000	Dyme	Nutty Professor II: The Klumps soundtrack
"The Great"	2000	None	Ryde or Die Vol. 2
"Fuhgidabowdit"	2000	LL Cool J, Method Man, Redman	G.O.A.T.
"The Future"	2000	Dame Grease, Big Stan, Meeno	Live on Lenox Ave.
"Rollin' (Urban Assault Vehicle)"	2000	Limp Bizkit, Method Man, Redman	Chocolate Starfish and the Hot Dog Flavored Water
"Who's Next (X-Clue-Sive)"	2001	DJ Clue?	The Professional 2
"Scream Double R"	2001	Eve	Scorpion
"Doggz II"	2001	Redman	Malpractice
"Uh-Hunh!"	2001	Jadakiss	Kiss tha Game Goodbye
"Walk with Me"	2001	Big Stan	Exit Wounds soundtrack
"Friend of Mine"	2001	None	Ryde or Die Vol. 3: In the "R" We Trust
"Most High" (Remix)	2002	Jerzee Monet	Love & War
"Deeper"	2003	DJ Envy	The Desert Storm Mixtape: Blok Party, Vol. 1
"Go to Sleep"	2003	Eminem, Obie Trice	Cradle 2 the Grave soundtrack
"Right/Wrong"	2003	None	Cradle 2 the Grave soundtrack
"Getting Down"	2003	Big Stan, Kashmir, Bazaar Royale	Cradle 2 the Grave soundtrack
"Homeboyz" (Remix)	2003	2Pac, Jadakiss, Butch Cassidy	Rap Phenomenon II
"What's Really Good"	2003	The Diplomats	Diplomatic Immunity
"Don't Gotta Go Home"	2003	Monica	After the Storm
"Let's Get Crazy"	2004	Drag-On	Hell and Back
"That's Who We Be"	2004	Bosko, Drag-On, Phats Bossi	That Fire
"Put Your Money"	2004	Ludacris	The Red Light District
"Streetlife"	2004	Dean Dawson	Streetlife Report
"Go for Dat"	2004	Lil Scrappy	Never Die Alone soundtrack
"Get Wild"	2005	Jadakiss, Flashy, Kartoon	Vol. 4: The Redemption
"Touch It" (Remix)	2005	Busta Rhymes, Mary J. Blige, Rah Digga, Missy Elliott, Lloyd Banks, Papoose	Non-album song
"Poppin' My Collar" (Remix)	2006	Three 6 Mafia, Project Pat, Lil' Flip	Non-album song
"Bad Boys"	2008	DJ GQ, Junior Reid, Dawg E Slaughter	Let Em' Know
"Intro"	2008	The Game	LAX
"Outro"	2008	The Game	LAX
"Uh Oh"	2008	G.A.G.E	G.A.G.E
"Who's Real" (Remix)	2009	Jadakiss, Swizz Beatz, Drag-On, Eve, Styles P, Sheek Louch	Non-album songs
"Stay Flawless"	2009	N.O.R.E., Ja Rule, Yummy Bingham	Non-album songs
"Stop the Party" (Remix)	2010	Busta Rhymes, T.I., Cam'ron, Ghostface Killah	Non-album songs
"Nutcracker" (Remix)	2010	N.O.R.E, Bun B, Imam Thug, Red Cafe	Non-album songs
"Make You Proud"	2011	Los, Sean Hayz	The Crown Ain't Safe
"World's Greatest"	2011	Mook, Drag-On, The Lox, Swizz Beatz	Ruff Ryders: Past, Present, Future
"Get Your Money Up"	2011	None	Ruff Ryders: Past, Present, Future
"D3mons"	2012	MGK	Lace Up
"Who's Touching You"	2012	Tyrese	Invisible Bully : The Lost Tapes
"I Don't Play Games"	2013	Pat Gallo	Fly Life Ep.1
"Ride Till I Die"	2015	Kay One, KNS Tha Engineer	Jung genug um darauf zu scheissen
"#GFU"	2016	DJ Hidrro, Lil Jon, Sue Cho	Non-album songs
"Real Friends" (Remix)	2016	Kanye West, Ty Dolla $ign	Non-album songs
"King Kong"	2018	Forever M.C., It's Different, Royce Da 5'9", KXNG Crooked, Statik Selektah	Forever M.C.
"Just In Case"	2019	Swizz Beatz, Rick Ross	Godfather of Harlem
"Who Want That"	2019	Merkules	Special Occasion
"Bout Shit"	2020	The Lox	Living Off Xperience
"Foolish"	2020	Berner	Russ Bufalino: The Quiet Don
"#GFUEntameta (Remix)"	2021	Canibus	Kaiju
"We Up"	2021	Chris Webby	Still Wednesday
"I Didn't Go"	2024	Joyner Lucas, Symba	Not Now, I'm Busy
"Start To Finish - S.T.F"	2025	IDK	Non-album songs

== Music videos ==
=== As lead artist ===
List of music videos as lead artist, with directors, showing year released
Title	Year	Director(s)
"Up to No Good"	1994	N/A
"Get at Me Dog" (featuring Sheek Louch)	1998	Hype Williams
"Stop Being Greedy"	1998	Nick Quested
"Ruff Ryders' Anthem"	1998	J. Jesses Smith
"How's It Goin' Down" (featuring Faith Evans)	1998	Hype Williams
"Grand Finale" (with Ja Rule, Method Man and Nas)	1998	Hype Williams
"Slippin'"	1999	Bishop, Rubin Whitmore II
"No Love 4 Me" (featuring Drag-On and Swizz Beatz)	1999	Chris Robinson, Bishop
"What's My Name?"	1999	Little X
"What These Bitches Want" (featuring Sisqó)	2000	Hype Williams
"Party Up (Up in Here)"	2000	David Meyers
"No Sunshine"	2001	Hype Williams
"We Right Here"	2001	J. Jesses Smith
"Who We Be"	2001	Joseph Kahn
"I Miss You" (featuring Faith Evans)	2002	Chris Robinson
"X Gon' Give It to Ya"	2003	Joseph Kahn
"Where the Hood At?"	2003	Vem & Tony
"Get It on the Floor" (featuring Swizz Beatz)	2003	Phenomenon
"We in Here" (featuring Swizz Beatz)	2006	Jonathan Mannion
"Lord Give Me a Sign"	2006	Marc Klasfeld
"Last Hope"	2011	Carlos Berber
"I Don't Dance" (featuring Machine Gun Kelly)	2012	John Colombo
"Hood Blues" (featuring Griselda)	2021	GoogleIsHuman

=== As featured artist ===
List of music videos as featured artist, with directors, showing year released
Title	Year	Director(s)
"4, 3, 2, 1" (LL Cool J featuring Canibus, DMX, Master P, Method Man and Redman)	1997	Diane Martel
"Shut 'Em Down" (Onyx featuring DMX)	1998	Gregory Dark
"Money, Power & Respect" (The Lox featuring DMX & Lil' Kim)	1998	Diane Martel
"Whatcha Gonna Do?" (Jayo Felony featuring DMX & Method Man)	1998	N/A
"24 Hrs. to Live" (Mase featuring The Lox, Black Rob and DMX)	1998	Nick Quested
"Ryde or Die" (Ruff Ryders featuring DMX, The LOX & Eve)	1999	N/A
"Come Back in One Piece" (Aaliyah featuring DMX)	2000	Little X
"Do You" (Funkmaster Flex featuring DMX)	2000	N/A
"Tear It Up" (Yung Wun featuring DMX, David Banner & Lil' Flip, )	2004	Gil Green
"Touch It" (Remix) (Busta Rhymes featuring Mary J. Blige, Rah Digga, Missy Elliott, Lloyd Banks, Papoose and DMX)	2006	Benny Boom
"Innocent Man" (Mark Morrison featuring DMX )	2006	N/A
"A Song for You" (Bizzy Bone featuring DMX and Chris Notez)	2008	Ethan Lader
"Tell Ya Friendz" (NO.4 featuring DMX and Dani Stevenson)	2011	Francois Barthe and Jeff Adair
"Just in Case" (Godfather of Harlem featuring DMX, Rick Ross & Swizz Beatz)	2019	Daps
"Bout Shit" (The Lox featuring DMX)	2020	Rock Davis
"This Is the Way" (Five Finger Death Punch featuring DMX)	2024	Hype Williams
