= The Best of DMX =

Greatest hits album by DMX
- Released: January 26, 2010
- Recorded: 1997–2003
- Genre: Hardcore hip-hop; gangsta rap
- Label: Ruff Ryders; Def Jam
- Producer: Swizz Beatz; PK; Dame Grease; Nokio; Self; Irv Gotti; Tuneheadz; Shatek; Black Key; DJ Scratch; DJ Shok

DMX chronology
Playlist Your Way (2009)	The Best of DMX (2010)	The Weigh In (2012)

Professional ratings
Review scores
Source	Rating
AllMusic	4/5 stars

The Best of DMX is the third compilation and greatest hits album of DMX music released on January 26, 2010, by Ruff Ryders Entertainment and Def Jam Recordings. Due to DMX's departure from Def Jam Recordings, only songs that were released during his time there are included on this album. Most of the songs on the album were initially released as singles from his 5 studio albums released by Ruff Ryders Entertainment and Def Jam Recordings or singles from movie soundtracks he contributed to. It consists of songs deemed to be DMX's best by Def Jam Recordings.

Unlike previous albums and compilations, this album features the unedited version of "Where The Hood At" (with the words "reload" and "slugs" which had been cut out on the Grand Champ version). Following DMX's death, the album jumped to the number 2 spot on the Billboard 200 up from its position of 73 a week earlier.

== Track listing ==
#	Title	Producer(s)	Featured guest(s)	Length	On Original Album
1	"Where the Hood At?"	Tuneheadz		4:46	Grand Champ
2	"It's All Good"	Swizz Beatz		4:17	Flesh of My Flesh, Blood of My Blood
3	"What These Bitches Want"	Nokio	Sisqó	4:13	...And Then There Was X
4	"Get at Me Dog"	Dame Grease; PK (co-produced)	Sheek Louch	4:03	It's Dark and Hell Is Hot
5	"Ruff Ryders' Anthem"	Swizz Beatz		3:34	It's Dark and Hell Is Hot
6	"What's My Name?"	Self & Irv Gotti		3:52	...And Then There Was X
7	"Party Up (Up In Here)"	Swizz Beatz		4:28	...And Then There Was X
8	"X Gon' Give It to Ya"	Shatek		3:38	Cradle 2 the Grave / Grand Champ
9	"We Right Here"	Black Key		4:27	The Great Depression
10	"How's It Goin' Down"	PK		4:42	It's Dark and Hell Is Hot
11	"The Rain"	DJ Scratch		3:27	Grand Champ
12	"One More Road to Cross"	Swizz Beatz		4:20	...And Then There Was X
13	"Slippin'"	DJ Shok		5:05	Flesh of My Flesh, Blood of My Blood
14	"Get It On The Floor"	Swizz Beatz		4:24	Grand Champ
15	"Here We Go Again"	DJ Shok		3:52	...And Then There Was X
16	"Damien"	Dame Grease		3:42	It's Dark and Hell Is Hot
17	"Stop Being Greedy"	PK; Dame Grease (co-produced)		3:37	It's Dark and Hell Is Hot
18	"Who We Be"	Black Key		4:47	The Great Depression
19	"Grand Finale"	Irv Gotti, Lil' Rob	Method Man, Nas and Ja Rule	4:38	Belly (soundtrack)
20	"No Love 4 Me"	Swizz Beatz	Drag-On and Swizz Beatz	4:01	Flesh of My Flesh, Blood of My Blood
21	"Blackout"	Swizz Beatz	Jay-Z and The Lox	4:56	Flesh of My Flesh, Blood of My Blood

Notes

- Tracks 20 and 21 are only on the digital releases and not the physical.

== Charts ==
=== Weekly charts ===
Weekly chart performance for The Best of DMX
Chart (2010–2021)	Peak position
Canadian Albums (Billboard)	3
Irish Albums (OCC)	20
New Zealand Albums (RMNZ)	12
Swiss Albums (Schweizer Hitparade)	40
UK Albums (OCC)	12
UK R&B Albums (OCC)	1
US Billboard 200	2
US Top R&B/Hip-Hop Albums (Billboard)	1

=== Year-end charts ===
Year-end chart performance for The Best of DMX
Chart (2021)	Position
US Top R&B/Hip-Hop Albums (Billboard)	83

== Certifications ==
Region	Certification	Certified units/sales
United Kingdom (BPI)	Gold	100,000^{‡}
^{‡} Sales+streaming figures based on certification alone.
