= The Definition of X: The Pick of the Litter =

2007 greatest hits album by DMX

Greatest hits album by DMX
- Released: June 12, 2007
- Recorded: 1997–2003
- Studio: New Horizon Sounds Studio (Capitol Heights, Maryland); Chung King Studios (New York City); The Hit Factory (New York City); Powerhouse Studios (New York City); Soundtrack Studios (New York City); Hit Factory Criteria (New York City); Enterprise Studios (Burbank, California); Quad Recording Studios (Times Square, New York); Chaton Studios (Scottsdale, Arizona)
- Genre: Hardcore hip hop
- Length: 79:08
- Label: Def Jam
- Producer: Black Key; Dame Grease; DJ Scratch; DJ Shok; Irv Gotti; Nokio; P. Killer Trackz; Self; Shatek; Swizz Beatz; Tuneheadz

DMX chronology
Year of the Dog… Again (2006)	The Definition of X: The Pick of the Litter (2007)	Undisputed (2012)

Professional ratings
Review scores
Source	Rating
AllMusic	4.5/5 stars
Stylus	B+

The Definition of X: The Pick of the Litter is the first greatest hits album by American rapper DMX. It was released on June 12, 2007, by Def Jam Recordings. Production was handled by Swizz Beatz, Dame Grease, P. Killer Trackz, Black Key, DJ Shok, DJ Scratch, Irv Gotti, Nokio, Self, Shatek King and Tuneheadz. It features guest appearances from The Lox, Drag-On, Jay-Z, Sisqó and Swizz Beatz.

In the United States, the album debuted at number 26 on the Billboard 200, number 7 on the Top R&B/Hip-Hop Albums and number 3 on the Top Rap Albums, selling about 35,000 copies in its first week. It received a Silver certification by British Phonographic Industry on April 3, 2020, for selling 60,000 units in the UK.

Although the album has both an explicit version and an edited version, on the explicit version on the track "Where the Hood At" some lines are still edited. The track "Slippin" is also the edited version. Also "Prayer III" is actually "Prayer II" from Flesh of My Flesh, Blood of My Blood.

== Track listing ==
No.	Title	Writer(s)	Producer(s)	Length
1.	"Prayer III"	Earl Simmons		2:04
2.	"Ruff Ryders' Anthem"	Simmons; Kaseem Dean	Swizz Beatz	3:32
3.	"Get at Me Dog" (featuring Sheek Louch)	Simmons; Damon Blackman; Anthony Fields; Sam Taylor	Dame Grease; P. Killer Trackz (add.)	3:05
4.	"Stop Being Greedy"	Simmons; Fields; Blackman; Michael Masser	P. Killer Trackz; Dame Grease (add.)	3:36
5.	"How's It Goin' Down"	Simmons; Fields	P. Killer Trackz	4:04
6.	"What These Bitches Want" (featuring Sisqó)	Simmons; Mark Andrews; Tamir Ruffin	Nokio	4:13
7.	"Blackout" (featuring Jay-Z and The Lox)	Simmons; Shawn Carter; David Styles; Jason Phillips; Sean Jacobs; Dean; Sarah Carter	Swizz Beatz	4:55
8.	"What's My Name?"	Simmons; Edward Hinson; Irving Lorenzo	Self; Irv Gotti	3:52
9.	"Where the Hood At?"	Simmons; Eriberio Serrano; Franklin Crum; Antonio Hardy	Tuneheadz	4:46
10.	"Party Up (Up in Here)"	Simmons; Dean	Swizz Beatz	4:32
11.	"X Gon' Give It to Ya"	Simmons; Shatek King; Dean	Shatek	3:37
12.	"It's All Good"	Simmons; Dean; Taana Gardner	Swizz Beatz	4:18
13.	"Who We Be"	Simmons; Michael Davis	Black Key; Melvin "Hip" Armstead (co.)	4:48
14.	"The Rain"	Simmons; George Spivey; Leonard Perry; Katie Davis; Mallory Cowart	DJ Scratch	3:27
15.	"Here We Go Again"	Simmons; Michael Gomez	DJ Shok	3:53
16.	"No Love 4 Me" (featuring Drag-On and Swizz Beatz)	Simmons; Melvin Smalls; Dean	Swizz Beatz	4:00
17.	"We Right Here"	Simmons; M. Davis	Black Key	4:28
18.	"One More Road to Cross"	Simmons; Dean	Swizz Beatz	4:20
19.	"Slippin'"	Simmons; Gomez; Grover Washington Jr.	DJ Shok	5:06
20.	"Prayer" (Skit)	Simmons	Dame Grease	2:32
Total length:				79:08

Sample credits

- Track 3 contains samples from "Everything Good to You" written by Sam Taylor and performed by B. T. Express
- Track 4 contains samples from "My Hero Is a Gun" written by Michael Masser and performed by The Temptations
- Track 9 contains samples from "Young Gifted & Black" written and performed by Antonio "Big Daddy Kane" Hardy
- Track 12 contains samples from "Heartbeat" written and performed by Taana Gardner
- Track 14 contains samples from "Will She Meet the Train in the Rain" written by Leonard Perry, Katie Davis and Mallory Cowart, and performed by Greg Perry
- Track 19 contains samples from "Moonstream" written and performed by Grover Washington Jr.

Notes

- Tracks 1, 7, 12, 16 and 19 are from Flesh of My Flesh, Blood of My Blood © 1998
  - Track 1 is originally titled as "Prayer II: Ready to Meet Him"
- Tracks 2, 3, 4, 5 and 20 are from It's Dark and Hell Is Hot © 1998
- Tracks 6, 8, 10, 15 and 18 are from ... And Then There Was X © 1999
  - Track 6 is listed as "What You Want" on the clean version of the album
- Tracks 9 and 14 are from Grand Champ © 2003
- Track 11 is from Cradle 2 the Grave © 2003
- Tracks 13 and 17 are from The Great Depression © 2001

== Personnel ==
- Earl "DMX" Simmons – performer
- Sean "Sheek Louch" Jacobs – performer (tracks: 3, 7)
- Lovey Ford – backing vocals (track 5)
- Schamika Grant – backing vocals (track 5)
- Mark "Sisqó" Andrews – performer (track 6)
- Shawn "Jay-Z" Carter – performer (track 7)
- David "Styles P" Styles – performer (track 7)
- Jason "Jadakiss" Phillips – performer (track 7)
- Dustin Adams – additional vocals (track 13)
- Melvin "Drag-On" Smalls – performer (track 16)
- Kaseem "Swizz Beatz" Dean – performer (track 16), producer (tracks: 2, 7, 10, 12, 16, 18)
- Tamyra Gray – additional vocals (track 19)
- Cliff Branch – keyboards (track 5)
- Kenya Miller – programming (track 6)
- Damon "Dame Grease" Blackman – producer (tracks: 3, 20), additional producer (track 4)
- Anthony "P. Killer Trackz" Fields – producer (tracks: 4, 5), additional producer (track 3)
- Tamir "Nokio" Ruffin – producer (track 6)
- Edward "Self" Hinson – producer (track 8)
- Irving "Irv Gotti" Lorenzo – producer (track 8)
- Eriberio Serrano – producer (track 9)
- Shatek King – producer (track 11)
- Michael "Black Key" Davis – producer (tracks: 13, 17)
- George "DJ Scratch" Spivey – producer (track 14)
- Michael "DJ Shok" Gomez – producer (tracks: 15, 19)
- Melvin "Hip" Armstead – co-producer (track 13)
- Justice Johnson – recording (track 2)
- Richard Keller – mixing (tracks: 2, 5, 9–12, 15–20), recording (tracks: 7, 12, 16, 19)
- D'Anthony Johnson – recording (tracks: 3, 4), mixing (track 3)
- Ken "Duro" Ifill – mixing (tracks: 4, 7, 8)
- "Prince" Charles Alexander – recording (track 5)
- Tony Smalios – mixing (track 6)
- Adam Gazzola – recording (tracks: 7, 12, 16, 19), mixing (track 19)
- Dragan Čačinović – recording & mixing (tracks: 9, 14)
- Chris Theis – recording (tracks: 10, 11, 15, 18)
- Jaime Weddle – recording (tracks: 13, 17)
- Otto D'Agnolo – recording (tracks: 13, 17)
- Brian Stanley – mixing (track 13)
- Tony Dawsey – mastering
- Dawud West – art direction, design
- Jonathan Mannion – photography
- Mark Mann – photography
- Tara Podolsky – A&R
- Leesa D. Brunson – A&R
- Antoinette Trotman – management
- Ian Allen – management
- Nicole Wyskoarko – management
- Rob Caiaffa – marketing
- Andy Proctor – package production manager

== Charts ==
Chart performance for The Definition Of X: Pick Of The Litter
Chart (2007)	Peak position
US Billboard 200	26
US Top R&B/Hip-Hop Albums (Billboard)	7
US Top Rap Albums (Billboard)	3

== Certifications ==
Region	Certification	Certified units/sales
United Kingdom (BPI)	Silver	60,000^{‡}
^{‡} Sales+streaming figures based on certification alone.
