= Murder Inc. (rap group) =

American hip hop group

- Origin: New York City, U.S.
- Genres: East Coast hip-hop; hardcore hip-hop
- Years active: 1995–2000
- Label: Def Jam
- Formed by: Irv Gotti
- Past members: Jay-Z; DMX (deceased); Ja Rule

Murder Inc. was an American East Coast hip hop supergroup composed of Jay-Z, DMX, and Ja Rule, formed by record executive Irv Gotti in 1995. They first appeared in tandem on fellow New York-based rapper Mic Geronimo's 1995 song "Time to Build." After each gaining commercial success, the trio later appeared on the cover for the June 1999 issue of the hip-hop magazine XXL.

"Murder Inc." was rebranded by Irv Gotti to a namesake record label that he co-founded in 1998; Ja Rule was signed to the label and served as its flagship artist. Shortly afterward, the group disbanded in 2000 due to internal conflicts.

== History ==
In 1987, DJ Irv Gotti met Jay-Z and the two ran around London together while Jaz-O was recording his debut album Word to the Jaz. Irv would later remark: "I knew Jay was different and special from them".

In 1988, Irv met DMX through his relationship with Jay-Z and Jaz-O, as they went on tour with Main Source and The U.M.C.'s. Irv shared a room with producer Chad Elliott, who saw his love for Hip-Hop and told him he should work with DMX and this crew out in Yonkers, New York, called Ruff Ryders. Irv convinced Ruff Ryders co-founder Waah Dean to buy him a drum machine to produce tracks for DMX. Irv would later say, "First time I heard X rhyme, blew me away, his energy & rawness, knew he was different and special." In 1993, Irv met Ja Rule through Chris Black, who was "a straight hustler." At the time, Ja and Chris were members of the group Cash Money Click, with O-1 as the third member. Irv said, "As soon as I met Ja and heard him spit, he immediately stood out from the pack".

Irv and Ja would become like brothers, as Ja would go everywhere with Irv, traveling to Yonkers to hang out with DMX and the Ruff Ryders, or meeting up with Jay-Z whenever Irv could. With little success, Irv continued to promote them all, putting out "Make A Move" with DMX at Sony Music, and "4 My Click" with Ja and the Cash Money Click at TVT Records/Blunt Records. In 1995, Jay-Z brought Damon Dash and Biggs to the studio and announced that they were his partners at Roc-A-Fella Records, asking Irv to help them. After Jay-Z recorded his debut album Reasonable Doubt, Irv brought "Ain't No Nigga" to Funkmaster Flex, and informed him of the Roc-A-Fella movement. Flex responded by playing the record on radio that night. Due to his involvement with Roc-A-Fella, Irv was then hired by Lyor Cohen to work at Def Jam Recordings. During Irv's first meeting with the label, he announced his plan to sign DMX, and was laughed at by record executives.

A few months later, Irv quit Def Jam because they refused to sign DMX. He was asked to return by Lyor, who told the A&R department, which included James Jones and Tina Davis, that Irv was to answer to him and Kevin Liles only. Irv immediately took Lyor, Liles, and Damon Dash to Yonkers to visit the Ruff Ryders studio. When they arrived, The Lox, Drag-On, and others were freestyling, as was DMX, with his jaws wired shut. Following their departure from the studio, Lyor, who was giddy with excitement, said "We have the pick of the litter." DMX immediately received an offer from Def Jam and after signing, began recording his debut album It's Dark and Hell Is Hot. Irv then brought "Get at Me Dog" to Funkmaster Flex, and explained who DMX and the Ruff Ryders were.

During this time, Ja Rule was stuck at TVT Records/Blunt Records with Steve Gottlieb, but Irv convinced Lyor to get Ja out of his contract and sign him to Def Jam. David McPherson, an executive at Sony Music, called Irv and set up a meeting, hoping to persuade Irv to produce for him. During the meeting, McPherson said: "I see what you're doing over there at Def Jam with Jay and X, and I am here on behalf of Tommy Mottola, we want to offer you a label deal". This offer forced Lyor's hand, and Def Jam co-founder Russell Simmons gifted Irv $3 million to start his own label, Murder Inc. Records. To solidify Murder Inc., Irv had Ja Rule record his debut album Venni Vetti Vecci, and gave the song "Holla Holla" to Funkmaster Flex. Irv also put together a supergroup called Murder Inc., which consisted of DMX, Jay-Z, and Ja Rule. The trio appeared on the June 1999 front and back cover of XXL magazine. Due to issues between Jay-Z and DMX, and the disdain that arose after their freestyle battle in the 1990s, an album never materialized, though the trio did record six tracks together.

== Discography ==
List of collaborations between DMX, Jay-Z & Ja Rule
Title	Artist(s)	Producer(s)	Album	Release date
"Time To Build"	Mic Geronimo featuring Ja Rule, Jay-Z and DMX	Irv Gotti	The Natural	November 28, 1995
"If It's On It's On"	Ja Rule, Chris Black and Nemesis featuring Jay-Z, DMX, Infared and Black Child	Irv Gotti	Freaknik '96 Vinyl	1996
"Read About It Freestyle"	DJ Craig G featuring DMX and Ja Rule	RZA	Summer Jamz	1997
"The Usual Suspects OG"	Mic Geronimo featuring DMX, Ja Rule, Cormega and Hussein Fatal	Daven "Prestige" Vanderpool	Def Jam's How to Be a Player Soundtrack	August 5, 1997
"Grand Finale (Dogz-4-Life) OG"	DJ Clue featuring DMX, Ja Rule, Method Man and Nas	Lil Rob and Irv Gotti	This Is It!! Part One	1998
"I Shot Ya '98 Freestyle"	DMX featuring Ja Rule	Poke & Tone	The Unstoppable Def Jam Sampler	1998
"Usual Suspects (The Siege)"	Mic Geronimo featuring DMX, Ja Rule, Jadakiss, Styles P. and Tragedy Khadafi	Daven "Prestige" Vanderpool	Vendetta	January 24, 1998
"Murdergram"	Jay-Z, Ja Rule and DMX	Tyrone Fyffe	Streets is Watching Soundtrack	May 12, 1998
"Can I Get A..."	Jay-Z featuring Ja Rule and Amil	Lil Rob and Irv Gotti	Vol. 2... Hard Knock Life	August 22, 1998
"Money, Cash, Hoes"	Jay-Z featuring DMX and Pain in da Ass	Swizz Beatz	Vol. 2... Hard Knock Life	September 29, 1998
"Grand Finale"	DMX featuring Ja Rule, Method Man and Nas	Lil Rob and Irv Gotti	Belly (Original Motion Picture Soundtrack)	October 27, 1998
"Gangsta Shit"	DJ Clue featuring Jay-Z and Ja Rule	Duro, DJ Clue and Lil Rob	The Professional	December 15, 1998
"Grand Finale Remix"	DMX featuring Ja Rule, Vita, Method Man and Nas	Lil Rob and Irv Gotti	Grand Finale Vinyl Single	1998
"Blackout"	DMX featuring Jay-Z, Jadakiss, Sheek Louch and Styles P.	Swizz Beatz	Flesh of My Flesh, Blood of My Blood	December 22, 1998
"More Money, More Cash, More Hoes Remix"	Jay-Z featuring DMX, Beanie Sigel and Memphis Bleek	Swizz Beatz	The Corruptor: The Soundtrack	February 23, 1999
"Kill 'Em All"	Ja Rule featuring Jay-Z	Self and Irv Gotti	Venni Vetti Vecci	March 2, 1999
"It's Murda"	Ja Rule featuring DMX and Jay-Z	Tyrone Fyffe, Irv Gotti and Richard "Love" Marshall	Venni Vetti Vecci	March 2, 1999
"Holla Holla Remix"	Ja Rule featuring Jay-Z, Vita, Caddillac Tah, Memphis Bleek, Black Child and Busta Rhymes	Lil Rob, Irv Gotti and Mr. Fingaz	Irv Gotti Presents: The Murderers	July 18, 1999
"Why We Die"	Busta Rhymes featuring DMX and Jay-Z	P. Killer Trackz	Anarchy	June 20, 2000
"Stay Flawless"	N.O.R.E. featuring DMX, Ja Rule and Yummy Bingham			December 21, 2009
"Bath Salts"	DMX featuring Jay-Z, Nas and Swizz Beatz	Swizz Beatz and Prime Maximus	Exodus	May 28, 2021

== See also ==
- East Coast hip hop
- List of East Coast hip hop artists
- List of musical supergroups
