= Redemption of the Beast =

Compilation album by DMX
- Released: January 13, 2015
- Recorded: 2013–2014
- Genre: East Coast hip-hop; hardcore hip-hop
- Length: 56:14
- Label: Seven Arts Music; Fontana
- Producer: Dame Grease; Divine Bars; Elicit; Swizz Beatz

DMX chronology
Undisputed (2012)	Redemption of the Beast (2015)	Exodus (2021)

Redemption of the Beast is the sixth compilation album by American rapper DMX. It was released by Seven Arts Music on January 13, 2015. It is composed of unreleased DMX songs, however the album was not authorized by DMX to be released.

== Background ==
The album features a track from former Roc-A-Fella artist Freeway, and former Flipmode artist Rampage. Swizz Beatz reportedly posted via Instagram that this album is a fraud and not the album he was working on with DMX, stating: "I see a lot of people hitting me about this album!!! I can tell you 100% this is not the album X and I are working on!!!! (I feel like Timbo with the Aaliyah movie rite now) SMH !!!!!! #DontdisrespecttheDog We Got Fire coming." HipHopDX stated in an article that this album was released through Seven Arts Music and that DMX reportedly did not consent to the release of the album, claiming the music to be "stolen"; however, Seven Arts Music claimed to have purchased the masters of the tracks and this was supposedly the second agreed upon album (Undisputed being the first) to be released on this imprint.

== Production and unauthorized release ==
In 2013, DMX announced he had begun working on his eighth studio album. He had been seen collaborating with producers Swizz Beatz and Dame Grease. In December, after regaining his passport, he embarked on a world tour with performances in Bulgaria and Serbia.

On January 7, 2015, it was announced by DMX's label Seven Arts Music, that he would be releasing a new album the next week entitled Redemption of the Beast, though Swizz Beatz and DMX's management stated later in the day that this was incorrect. On January 13, 2015, Seven Arts Music released the album. Two days later, it was announced by DMX's brother and manager Montana that DMX was no longer signed to Seven Arts Music and that they would be taking legal action against the label for the album's unauthorized release, stating,

Seven Arts Entertainment had no right to put out a new album. The only contract DMX had was for Undisputed & that came out two years ago. He don't have a contract with them to release another album. You can't just put somebody's album out without permission. X only had a contract with them for one album & that album already came out a long time ago. If they wanted to come out with another album, they had to come to the table. That's why we sent a cease & desist letter. Some of the songs are from the Undisputed album & there's three extra songs that he recorded that were not on the Undisputed album that they just put on that album. That's what they did. We don't even know where he got that picture on the cover from. It boils down to they have no rights to whip out that new album. His contract is over. He gave 'em the first album. The owner called me said he's stuck with a couple albums. He wants to push them out. He needed our help, so he had to sit at the table with us & he never did that. He decided to take it upon himself to do what the fuck he did. He was supposed to take care of some business with me & he took it upon himself not to do it, so he's gonna have a lot of problems if he does. He's already got problems.

— Montana,

== Track listing ==
Redemption of the Beast
No.	Title	Producer(s)	Length
1.	"Spit That Shit"	Divine Bars	3:58
2.	"Built Like a Bitch"		3:17
3.	"On and On"	Divine Bars	3:35
4.	"Get Up and Try Again"	Divine Bars	4:22
5.	"Solid" (featuring Rampage)	Elicit	3:48
6.	"I'm Gonna Win"	Divine Bars	2:43
7.	"It's a Problem" (featuring Big Stan and Kashmir)	Divine Bars	3:15
8.	"How's It Goin' Down"	Divine Bars	3:54
9.	"Shout It"		3:21
10.	"One More Night"	Dame Grease	3:44
11.	"56 Bars"	Swizz Beatz	2:19
12.	"Where You Been" (featuring Freeway)	Dame Grease	3:08
13.	"Right or Wrong" (featuring Jannyce)		3:40
14.	"Gonna Get Mine"	Dame Grease	4:12
15.	"We Gonna Make It" (performed by Bazaar Royale, Kashmir and Stan Spit)		3:45
16.	"Love That Bitch" (Remastered) (featuring Jannyce)	Divine Bars	3:12
Total length:			56:14

Notes

- "We Gonna Make It" samples the vocals from "It's a Problem"
- "Love That B*tch" was first released on DMX's seventh studio album Undisputed as a bonus track in 2012.
