= I Miss You (DMX song) =

Single by DMX featuring Faith Evans

from the album The Great Depression
- Released: January 15, 2002
- Recorded: 2001
- Genre: Christian hip-hop; R&B
- Length: 4:40
- Label: Ruff Ryders; Def Jam
- Songwriter(s): Earl Simmons

DMX singles chronology
"Who We Be" (2001)	"I Miss You" (2002)	"X Gon' Give It to Ya" (2003)

"I Miss You" is a song by American rapper DMX, released as the third and final single from his fourth album The Great Depression (2001). It features R&B singer Faith Evans.

== Song information ==
=== Meaning ===
This song is dedicated to DMX's grandmother, Mary Ella Holloway. Faith Evans sings a verse which recites Amazing Grace. The verse from Faith Evans is sung to add to the mood of the song. It is almost to imply that DMX was lost, but found his way in life after realising his potential.

=== Production ===
The song is considered one of DMX's most popular ones, however it is not present on his The Definition of X: The Pick of The Litter greatest hits compilation.

== Samples ==
The song samples This Masquerade by George Benson.

== Chart positions ==
Chart	Position
U.S. Billboard Hot 100	86
U.S. Billboard Hot R&B/Hip-Hop Singles & Tracks	37
German Singles Chart	87
