= Exit Wounds (soundtrack) =

Exit Wounds: The Album

Soundtrack album by Various artists
- Released: March 20, 2001
- Recorded: 2000–2001
- Genres: Hip hop; R&B
- Length: 1:16:30
- Labels: Blackground; Virgin; Warner Bros.
- Producers: Barry Hankerson (exec.); Jomo Hankerson (exec.); Beat Ballers; Bud'da; B-High; Brooklyn; Caviar; Dame Grease; DJ Paul; Irv Gotti; Juicy J; J-Runnah; J.V.; Keybeats; Mac G; Mr. Fingerz; Overdose; P. Killer Trackz; Teflon; Timbaland

Singles from Exit Wounds
- 1. "No Sunshine" Released: March 13, 2001

Professional ratings
Review scores
Source	Rating
AllMusic	4/5 stars

Exit Wounds: The Album is the soundtrack to Andrzej Bartkowiak's 2001 film Exit Wounds. It was released on March 20, 2001, four days after the film, through Blackground Records and Virgin Records with distribution via Warner Bros. Records, and consists primarily of hip hop music. The album composed of seventeen songs and features performances by the film star DMX, as well as Black Child, Drag-On, Ja Rule, Lady Luck, Mack 10, Memphis Bleek, Nas, Redman, Sheek Louch, Styles P, Three 6 Mafia, Trick Daddy, Trina, and WC among others. American rapper Christian "Yung Berg" Ward, then known as Iceberg, made his debut on this soundtrack on the track "Dog 4 Life".

The album peaked at number 8 on the Billboard 200 and at number 5 on the Top R&B/Hip-Hop Albums in the United States. It spawned a one charting single, "No Sunshine", which made it to #67 on the Hot R&B/Hip-Hop Songs.

== Track listing ==
No.	Title	Producer(s)	Length
1.	"No Sunshine" (performed by DMX)	Dame Grease	5:17
2.	"State to State" (performed by Black Child feat. Ja Rule)	Irv Gotti; Mr. Fingerz	4:08
3.	"Gangsta Tears" (performed by Nas)	Bud'da	3:19
4.	"We Got" (performed by Trick Daddy feat. Trina)	J.V.	3:22
5.	"Party" (performed by Sincere feat. Timbaland)	Bud'da	4:27
6.	"It's on Me" (performed by Ideal)	Keybeats	4:50
7.	"They Don't Fuck Wit U" (performed by Three 6 Mafia feat. Project Pat)	DJ Paul; Juicy J	4:58
8.	"Walk With Me" (performed by Big Stan feat. DMX)	P. Killer Trackz	4:38
9.	"1-2-3" (performed by Memphis Bleek)	B-High; J-Runnah	4:17
10.	"Bust Your Gun" (performed by The LOX feat. Styles P & Sheek Louch)	P. Killer Trackz	4:08
11.	"Steady Grinding" (performed by Mack 10 feat. Cash Money Millionaires)	Beat Ballers	5:01
12.	"Incense Burning" (performed by Playa)	Keybeats	4:48
13.	"Off da Chain Daddy" (performed by Drag-On feat. Aja)	Teflon	4:25
14.	"Hell Yeah (Remix)" (performed by Outsiderz 4 Life)	Timbaland	5:06
15.	"Hey Ladies" (performed by Lady Luck feat. Redman)	Brooklyn	4:42
16.	"Fo' All Y'all" (performed by Caviar & WC)	Caviar; Overdose	4:38
17.	"Dog 4 Life" (performed by Iceberg)	Mac G	4:26
Total length:			1:16:30

Notes

- Track 1 contains an interpolation of "Ain't No Sunshine" by Bill Withers

== Charts ==
Chart (2001)	Peak position
US Billboard 200	8
US Top R&B/Hip-Hop Albums (Billboard)	5
US Top Soundtracks (Billboard)	15
