= Rubin Whitmore II =

American media maker

Rubin Whitmore II is an American media maker who directs mostly music videos and short narratives. Born and raised in Milwaukee, Wisconsin, he received his undergraduate degree in Radio/TV/Film from the University of Wisconsin-Oshkosh where he was selected Outstanding Young Alumni and he is a MFA candidate in Digital Cinema at National University. While in his senior year at UW-Oshkosh he directed his first national music video for MC Breed's "Late Nite Creep".

He has directed and produced projects ranging from docudrama, 10 Rules for Dealing with Police to Internet webisode, "omg!". His stories often involve multi-cultural perspectives and casts. He has directed music videos for KRS-One, Gang Starr, DMX, The Temptations and many others. The music video featuring E-40, "Sprinkle Me", was produced and directed by Whitmore and is the "#10 Greatest West Coast Video" according to MTV2 and XXL.

He is also a media scholar and activist. Whitmore currently instructs at the Art Institute and has lectured at universities and colleges across the country regarding media's impact on society. He has declared that "Media is a weapon, TV is a gun, the programming is the bullets." He has participated in political campaigns as a media consultant and encourages the use of new media as an effective tool for business and social entrepreneurship.

Whitmore is the director of the feature film 420.

Whitmore is a member of Alpha Phi Alpha fraternity.

== Music videography (director or producer) partial list ==
- 3 Piece - Ohh Ahh
- Big Mike - Playa Playa
- C-Bo - Birds in the Kitchen
- Cha Cha - New Millennium
- Christion - Next 2 You
- Click - Hurricane
- Coko - Triflin'
- Dayton Family - Goin Thru A Thang
- Digital Underground - Walk Real Kool
- DMX - Slippin'
- E.S.G. - Swangin' & Bangin'
- E-40 featuring Too $hort & K.C. - Rapper's Ball
- E-40 - Sprinkle Me
- Elusion - Reality
- eMC – The Show
- Gang Starr - Discipline
- Ghosttown DJs - My Boo
- Goodie Mob - Dirty South
- Goodie Mob - Soul Food
- Indigo Girls - Shame On You
- Inoj - Love You Down
- Jadakiss - Put Yo Hands Up
- Jadakiss, Snoop Dogg, Scarface & Young One - WWIII
- Joe -The Love Scene
- Keith Murray - It's That Hit
- KRS-One - Step Into A World
- Kwamé - What's It Like
- Luniz - I Got Five On It (Remix)
- M.C. Breed - Late Nite Creep (Booty Call)
- Mack 10 - Hoo-Bangin'
- Mad Skillz - The Nod Factor
- Means & Pamela - Up to Here
- Mystikal - Out That Bootcamp Clicc
- New Edition featuring Missy "Misdemeanor" Elliott - You Don't Have To Worry
- Nitti, Ray – Bow!
- Questionmark Asylum - Get With You
- Spice 1 - Nineteen Ninety Sick
- Temptations - I'm Here
- Too $hort - Cocktails
- Too $hort - Top Down
- Too $hort - Paystyles
- Tung Twista – Suicide
- Usher - Dreamin

== DVDs and films partial list ==
- Too Short: Cocktales
- 20th Century Masters: The Best of The Temptations
- 10 Rules for Deal with Police
- 420

== Webisodes ==
- omg!
