= No Sunshine (DMX song) =

2001 single by DMX

Single by DMX

from the album Exit Wounds: The Album
- Released: March 13, 2001
- Length: 5:17
- Label: Blackground; Virgin; Warner Bros.
- Songwriter(s): Earl Simmons; Damon Blackman; Bill Withers
- Producer(s): Dame Grease

DMX singles chronology
"Don't You Ever" (2000)	"No Sunshine" (2001)	"We Right Here" (2001)

Music video
- "No Sunshine" on YouTube

"No Sunshine" is a song by American rapper DMX, released on March 13, 2001, as the lead single from the soundtrack of the 2001 film Exit Wounds, which he also starred in. Produced by Dame Grease, it contains a sample of "Ain't No Sunshine" by Bill Withers.

The song is also used as the entrance music of former UFC Middleweight Champion Anderson Silva.

== Composition and critical reception ==
The song is considered a dark take of "Ain't No Sunshine". Mitch Findlay of HotNewHipHop wrote, "Throughout the lengthy track, X alternates between a chanted delivery and a more dexterous one, weaving a haunting cautionary tale ripe with violent imagery — and let's be honest, who does that better than DMX?"

== Charts ==
Chart (2001)	Peak position
US Hot R&B/Hip-Hop Songs (Billboard)	67
