= DMX =

American rapper (1970–2021)

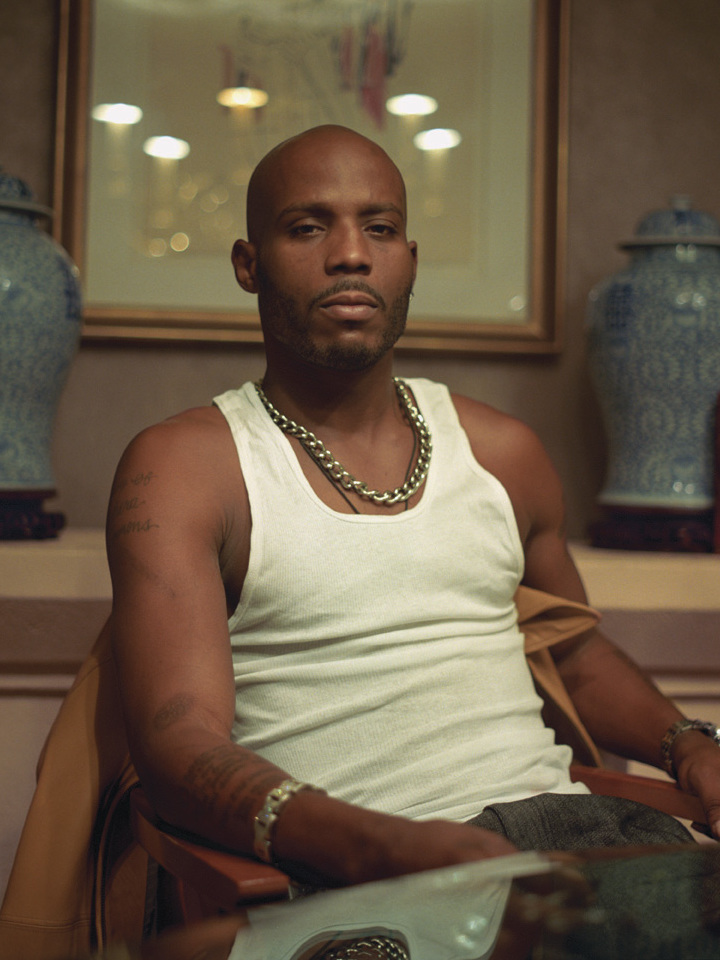
- DMX in 2001
- Born: Earl Simmons; December 18, 1970; Mount Vernon, New York, U.S.
- Died: April 9, 2021 (aged 50); White Plains, New York, U.S.
- Burial place: Oakland Cemetery, Yonkers, New York, U.S.
- Other names: Dark Man X; X; Divine Master of the Unknown; Dog Master X
- Occupations: Rapper; songwriter; actor
- Years active: 1985–2021
- Works: DMX discography
- Spouse: Tashera Simmons (m. 1999; div. 2014)
- Children: 15
- Musical career
- Origin: Yonkers, New York, U.S.
- Genres: East Coast hip-hop; horrorcore; hardcore hip-hop; Christian hip-hop
- Instrument: Vocals
- Labels: RAL; Island Def Jam; Def Jam; Ruff Ryders; Columbia; Bloodline; Cleopatra
- Formerly of: Murder Inc.; Ruff Ryders
- Website: dmx.store

Signature
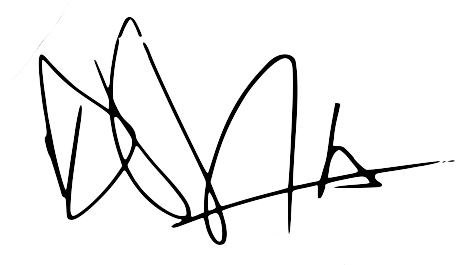

Earl Simmons (December 18, 1970 – April 9, 2021), known professionally as DMX, was an American rapper, songwriter, and actor. His accolades included an American Music Award, a Billboard Music Award, and four Grammy Award nominations. Regarded as an influential figure in the late 1990s and early 2000s and one of the greats of hip-hop, his music is characterized by his "aggressive" rapping style, with lyrical content varying from hardcore themes to personal themes such as trauma or childhood abuse.

DMX began rapping in the late 1990s. After an unsuccessful tenure on Columbia Records, he signed with Ruff Ryders Entertainment in a joint venture with Def Jam Recordings to release his debut studio album, It's Dark and Hell Is Hot (1998), which was met with critical and commercial success—selling 251,000 copies in its first week and spawning the Billboard Hot 100-top 20 single, "Ruff Ryders' Anthem". His second album, Flesh of My Flesh, Blood of My Blood (1998), was followed by his third, ... And Then There Was X (1999), which became his best-selling release and was supported by his second top 40 single, "Party Up (Up in Here)". His fourth album, The Great Depression (2001), was followed by his fifth, Grand Champ (2003), which was led by the single "Where the Hood At?" and included the international bonus track "X Gon' Give It to Ya". DMX became the first artist to have their first five albums consecutively debut atop the Billboard 200, and by his death on April 9, 2021, he had sold over 75 million records worldwide.

DMX acted in commercially successful films such as Belly (1998), alongside rapper Nas, Romeo Must Die (2000) and Cradle 2 the Grave (2003), alongside Jet Li, and Exit Wounds (2001), alongside Steven Seagal. In 2006, he starred in the reality television series DMX: Soul of a Man, which was primarily aired on the BET cable television network. In 2003, he published a book of his memoirs titled E.A.R.L.: The Autobiography of DMX.

== Early life ==
Earl Simmons was born on December 18, 1970, in Mount Vernon, New York. He was the son of 19-year-old Arnett Simmons and 18-year-old Joe Barker. Simmons was the middle child of the family; his mother had given birth to a daughter two years prior, later gave birth to a second daughter, and two stillborn sons. His father, Barker, painted watercolor paintings of street scenes to sell at local fairs, having moved to Philadelphia to fulfill his career.

In his childhood years, Simmons first experienced physical violence from his mother, and was diagnosed with bronchial asthma. He was raised as a Jehovah's Witness. He disassociated himself from the spirituality after he was injured in an accident by a driver. At the age of five, his mother sent him to live with relatives in Yonkers' School Street housing apartments in the Nodine Hill neighborhood. After suffering from his mother's abuse, he was expelled from a middle school at the age of ten, having been sent to a group home. He then returned to Yonkers at age fifteen, sleeping in empty storage bins and befriending stray dogs. Due to poor grades at Yonkers Middle High School, Simmons was unable to finish his track and field team schedule. Broke, he robbed several students to find food and clothing for himself, as well as a leather collar and harness for his pet dog. He then began carjacking.

== Musical career ==
=== 1985–1995: Career beginnings ===
His career began in 1985, when he beatboxed for a local rapper named Ready Ron. They would do small shows together where Ron would perform as a rapper, and DMX would beatbox and provide ad-libs. After some time, he realized Ron was becoming more prominent on the scene, so he decided to start rapping himself under the name "DMX" inspired by the Oberheim DMX drum machine—he made it an initialism for "Divine Master of the Unknown" and later "Darkman X". After serving a two-year prison sentence, he began writing his own lyrics and performing at the local recreation center for younger children. In 1988, while in prison for carjacking, he began dedicating more of his free time to writing lyrics and battling other inmates. During this time, he had created a style called "Spellbound" where he spelled each word out letter by letter. He and future rival, K-Solo, engaged in battles. The initial Ruff Ryders group started with a preteen Jadakiss, Swizz Beatz as a child, and DMX. In 1988, Irv Gotti was roommates with producer Chad Elliott who later introduced him in the Schlobohm housing projects in Yonkers to DMX and brothers Joaquin "Waah" and Darrin "Dee" Dean, who had mentioned they were creating a company called Ruff Ryders together. Gotti convinced Waah to buy him a drum machine to produce records for DMX. Elliott and Gotti produced a beat in 1989 called Born Loser which became one of DMX's first music demos.

He later made an appearance on The Stretch Armstrong and Bobbito Show in January 1991, where he provided a freestyle. The Source praised DMX in its Unsigned Hype column that highlighted unsigned hip-hop artists. In 1991, DMX signed a management deal with the then-unknown record label Ruff Ryders Entertainment. Later that year, Columbia Records signed DMX to its subsidiary labels Chaos Records and Ruffhouse Records, which released his major debut single "Born Loser" in 1993. Failing to meet commercial projections and not reaching any music charts, he was then terminated from his contract with Ruffhouse and became an independent artist. In January 1994, Death Row Records attempted to sign the rapper in a joint venture with Ruff Ryders, although this never materialized.

=== 1996–1997: Building hype and signing to Def Jam ===
After two years of struggling in the industry, his friend and associate, Irv Gotti, became the president of A&R at Def Jam Recordings. After showcasing for then-president Lyor Cohen, DMX was signed to Def Jam Recordings in May 1997.

=== 1998–2000: Debut album and commercial success ===
DMX recorded tracks from April 1997 to January 1998 for his debut album. During this time, his guest appearances on Mase's singles "24 Hrs. to Live" and "Take What's Yours", The Lox's single "Money, Power & Respect", and Def Jam labelmate LL Cool J's single "4, 3, 2, 1" created a strong buzz for his upcoming album. In February 1998, he released his debut major-label single "Get at Me Dog" on Def Jam Recordings. The single received an RIAA certification of gold. His first major-label album It's Dark and Hell Is Hot, which included the single "Ruff Ryders' Anthem", was then released in May 1998. The album debuted at number one on the Billboard 200 chart in the U.S. and sold over six million copies. In December 1998, he released his album Flesh of My Flesh, Blood of My Blood. It debuted at number one on the Billboard 200 and went multi-platinum. DMX became the only rapper alive to have his first two consecutive number-one Billboard 200 albums within a one-year period (seven months by calculation) and the first since Tupac Shakur; DMX's record would later be surpassed two different times in 2020 by YoungBoy Never Broke Again, who made the number one position with two albums in six months (a month down by proxy, making it the fastest) and also had three number one albums in ten months between 2019 and 2020, also beating another Billboard record by DMX involving a quantity of number one rap albums within a year.

He released his third album ... And Then There Was X, on December 21, 1999. It was his third album to debut at number one on the Billboard 200. Its most popular single, "Party Up (Up in Here)", became his first top ten hit on the R&B charts, and was nominated for a Grammy Award for Best Rap Solo Performance at the 2001 Grammy Awards. The album was certified six-times Platinum, and was also nominated for Best Rap Album at the 2001 Grammy Awards. In 2000, DMX also made a cameo appearance in the Sum 41 music video for "Makes No Difference".

In late 2000, he joined other Hip Hop and Nu Metal artists on the Anger Management Tour. Appearing alongside Limp Bizkit, Godsmack and Sinnistar for the second half of the tour from November 24 to December 19, 2000.

=== 2001–2004: Return to music ===
After improving his legal situation, DMX returned to the studio to complete his fourth album, The Great Depression. With its release on October 23, 2001, it was his fourth album to debut at number one on the Billboard 200, featuring the singles "Who We Be", "We Right Here", and "I Miss You". Despite the album's triple platinum certification, its commercial and critical success was lower than his previous album. His fifth album, Grand Champ, released in September 2003, once again debuted at number one on the Billboard 200, becoming his final album in his lifetime to do so. It sold over four million in the U.S., including the singles "Where the Hood At?" and "Get It on the Floor". After its release, he informed the public that he planned to retire, intending for Grand Champ to be his final album.

=== 2005–2011: Year of the Dog... Again and The Definition of X ===
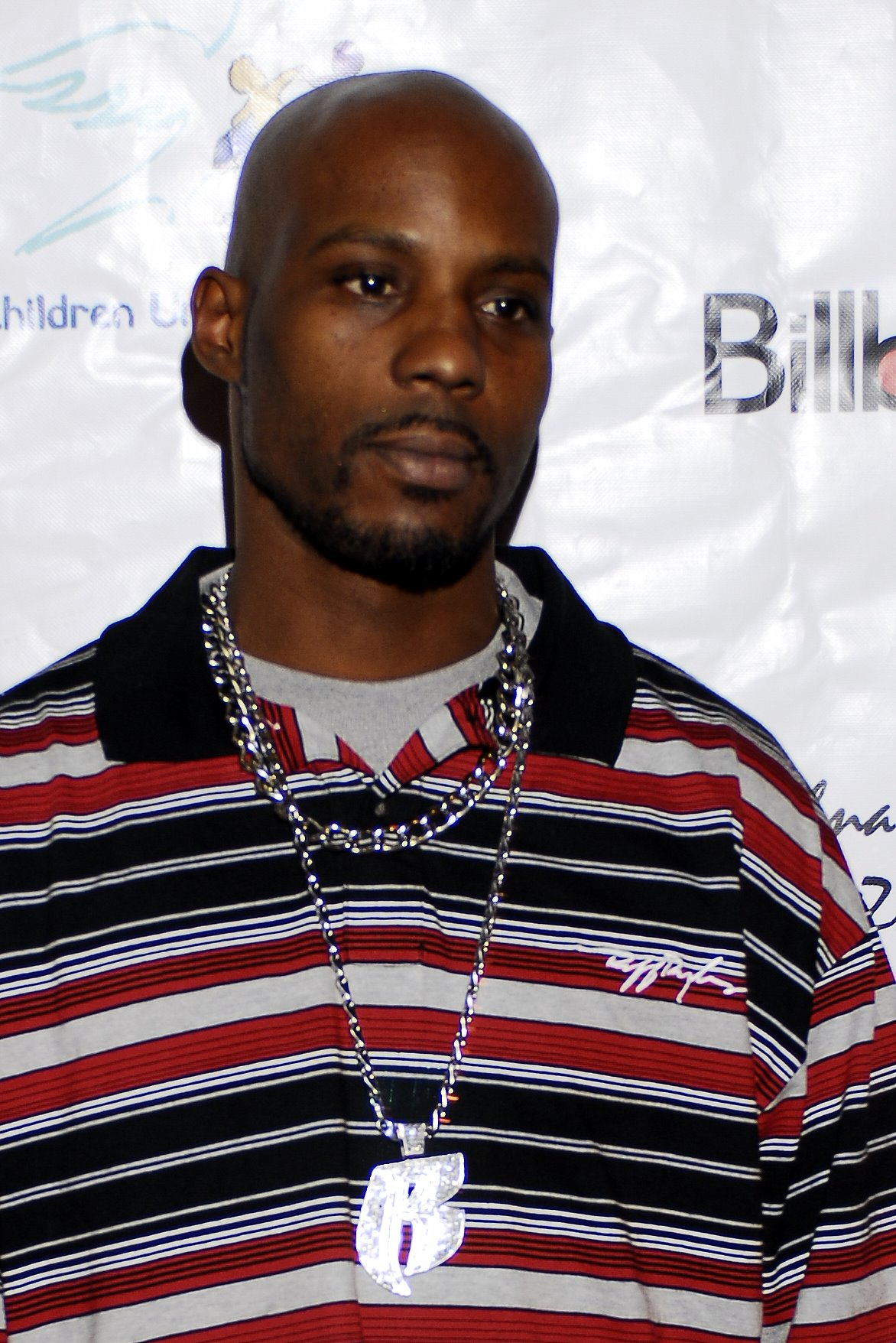
DMX in February 2007

After conflict with Def Jam, DMX signed to Columbia Records, Def Jam's former parent company, in January 2006, returning to the label since 1992. He recorded his sixth album, Year of the Dog... Again, while switching between the two labels, which caused numerous delays. It was released on August 1, 2006, and debuted at number two on the Billboard 200. He released two more singles, "Lord Give Me a Sign" and "We in Here". The album received mixed reviews from critics. On June 12, 2007, Def Jam released his greatest hits album, The Definition of X: The Pick of the Litter.

In 2009, DMX claimed he would pursue preaching in Jersey City, New Jersey as well as continue to produce music. He completed a Gospel music album prior to his incarceration. According to MTV, he had semi-retired to study the Bible in an effort to give messages behind the pulpit. Def Jam released another compilation album in 2010 titled The Best of DMX, which features hit singles including "Where the Hood At?" and "X Gon' Give It To Ya".

=== 2011–2013: Undisputed ===
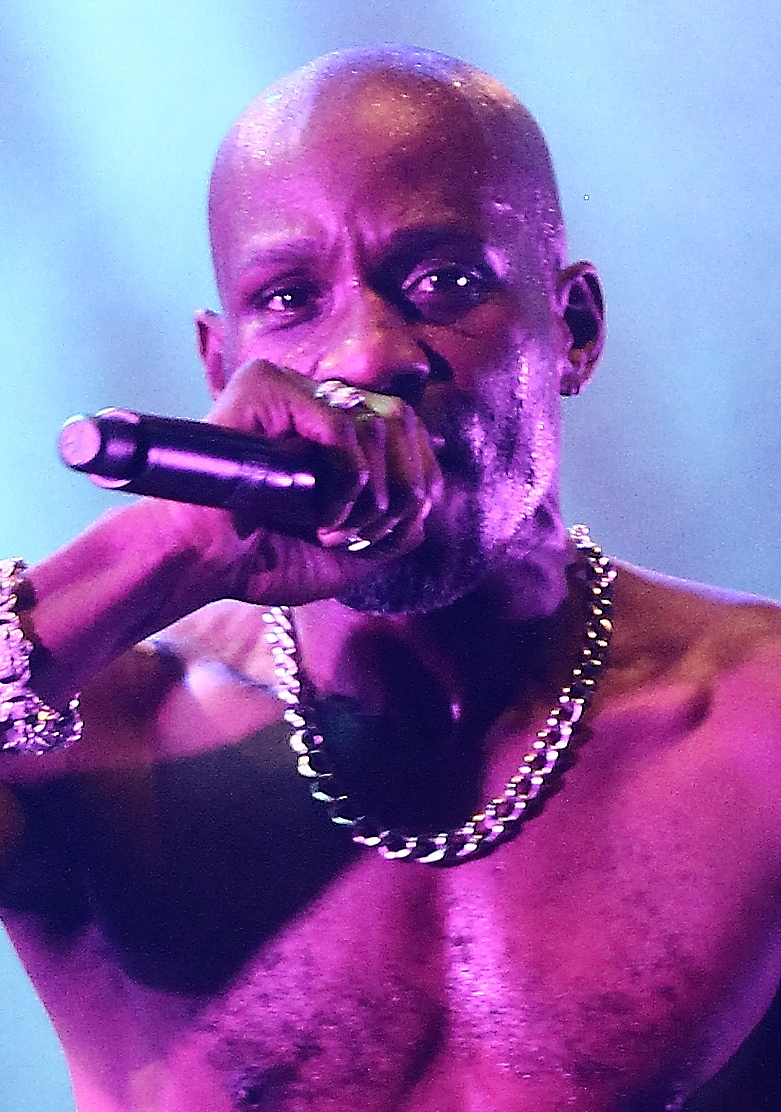
DMX performing in 2014

On October 11, 2011, DMX performed at the 2011 BET Hip Hop Awards. He stated that he has been working "nonstop, every day" on his seventh album, which was titled Undisputed. A video for a new track titled "Last Hope" was released via the Internet on September 24, 2011, and was later included on The Weigh In EP released digitally on May 5, 2012. In late February 2012, Seven Arts Pictures acquired the catalog of DMX's music and signed DMX to a two-album deal. During a performance at New York's Santos Party House on December 25, 2011, DMX stated that the new album would be titled Undisputed and would be released on March 26, 2012. After numerous delays, the album was eventually released on September 11, 2012, and featured production from Swizz Beatz and J.R. Rotem with a guest appearance by MGK.

=== 2013–2021: Def Jam reunion and Exodus ===
In 2013, DMX announced he had begun working on his eighth studio album. He collaborated with producers Swizz Beatz and Dame Grease. In December, after regaining his passport, he embarked on a world tour with performances in Bulgaria and Kosovo. On January 7, 2015, Seven Arts Music announced that DMX would be releasing Redemption of the Beast the following week; however, close personal friend and recurring collaborator producer/rapper/entrepreneur Swizz Beatz and DMX's management confirmed that this was false. On January 13, 2015, Seven Arts Music released Redemption of the Beast, without acquiring a legal artist contract. On January 15, 2015, it was announced by DMX's brother/manager Montana that DMX was no longer signed to Seven Arts Music and that they would be taking legal action against Seven Arts Music for the unauthorized release of Redemption of the Beast.

Long-time collaborator Swizz Beatz stated that two of the collaborators on the album would be Kanye West and Dr. Dre. His 2003 song "X Gon' Give It to Ya" was featured in the 2016 film Deadpool and in its trailers. On June 28, 2016, DMX released a new song titled "Blood Red" and produced by Divine Bars. On January 11, 2017, DMX released a new song produced by Swizz Beats titled "Bain Iz Back". On September 20, 2019, DMX signed a new record deal with Def Jam Recordings, reuniting with the label for the first time since his 2003 album Grand Champ. He joined fellow labelmate, LL Cool J, in the reunion with the label.

DMX's eighth and posthumous studio album, Exodus, was released through Def Jam on May 28, 2021.

== Personal life ==
=== Religion ===
DMX claimed to be a born-again Christian, and stated that he read the Bible every day. While in jail, DMX stated that he had a purpose for being there:

"I came here to meet somebody...Don't know who it was, but I'll know when I see him. And I came here to give him a message. And that message is Jesus loves them."

DMX was a transitional deacon and aspired to become ordained as a pastor, stating that he received this call in 2009. In 2016, he gave a sermon at a church in Phoenix, Arizona.

=== Relationships and children ===
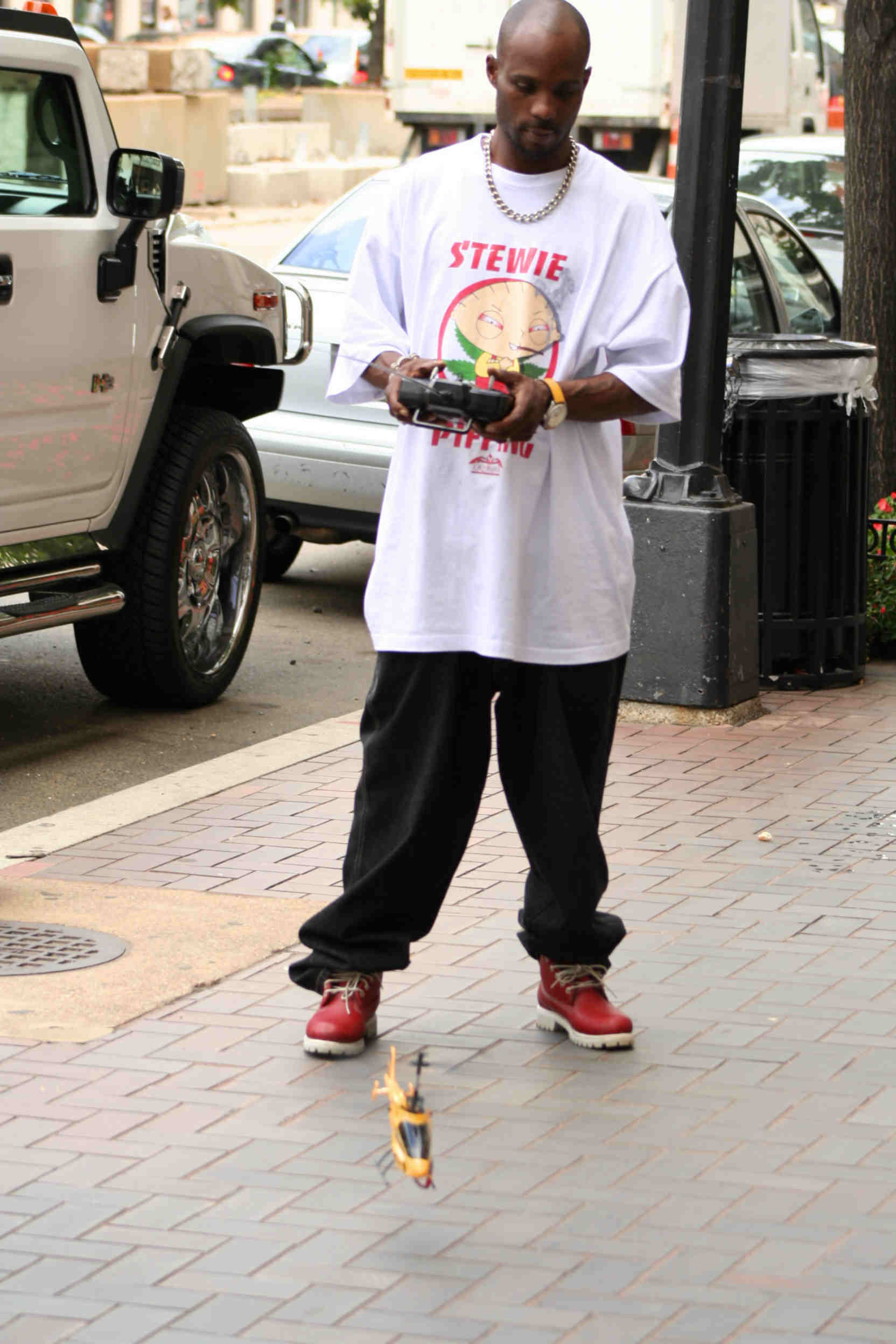
DMX in July 2006

DMX was the father of 15 children from 9 different women. He married his childhood friend Tashera Simmons in 1999. They had four children together. In July 2010, after his first of three incarcerations that year, Tashera announced their separation. They divorced in 2014 and remained friends, although in 2016, Tashera accused DMX of missing his $10,000 per month child support payment.

DMX had a daughter with Patricia Trejo. In 2012, Trejo sued DMX for $1 million in unpaid child support. The case was settled in 2013.

DMX and Monique Wayne, a Maryland resident, fought over her claim that he was the father of her son born in 2004. She sued him for defamation and for child support. After genetic testing proved that DMX was the father, in January 2008, DMX was ordered to pay Wayne $1.5 million, but a judge vacated the judgment in May 2008.

DMX also fathered a son and a daughter with Yadira Borrego. He fathered another child with his fiancée Desiree Lindstrom on August 16, 2016.

DMX's final two children, twin boys, were born in 2019. Their mother is Pebbles Junell.

DMX did not have a will. As a result, legal battles ensued in probate courts following his death.

=== Finances and bankruptcies ===
DMX filed for bankruptcy three times. His first filing was on July 30, 2013, citing his child support obligations as his priority claim. The filing was challenged by the United States Trustee Program and was dismissed by the U.S. Bankruptcy Court in Manhattan on November 11, 2013.

=== Feud with Ja Rule ===
During the 1990s, DMX formed a close bond with fellow up-and-coming rappers Jay-Z and Ja Rule. The three collaborated many times and formed a group known as Murder Inc. The group was short-lived due to internal issues between DMX and Jay-Z. After the breakup of the group DMX disparaged Ja Rule, accusing him of being a copycat and drawing comparisons between himself and what he saw as Ja Rule stealing his signature "gruff" style of delivery. DMX would then release his second album Flesh Of My Flesh, Blood Of My Blood which contained the diss track "We Don't Give a Fuck" that was directed towards Ja Rule and produced by Irv Gotti. Ja Rule would then respond in the song "We Different" from the compilation album Irv Gotti Presents: The Murderers. DMX would also go on to throw shots at Ja Rule in his song "Do You" from Funkmaster Flex's mixtape The Mix Tape, Vol. IV.

In 2002, DMX released his diss track "They Want War" on DJ Kay Slay's mixtape Streetsweepers Presents The Regulator Pt. 5 The Final Chapter. Ja Rule never responded directly but he went on to diss DMX in his songs "Fuck With Us" and "Connected" from his album The Last Temptation. The next year DMX would take shots at Ja Rule in the song "Go To Sleep" with Eminem and Obie Trice from the Cradle 2 The Grave soundtrack. DMX would also release another diss track titled "Ruled Out" and he would also diss Ja Rule again in his song "Where the Hood At?". Ja Rule then dissed DMX in Caddillac Tah's song "Duck" and his own songs "Clap Back" and "Blood In My Eye" from his album of the same name. However, as time passed and the feud faded into obscurity, DMX said that he wanted to officially bring it to an end when he was released from prison in 2005: "Gotti came to me in jail and said I want to make peace with you and him. I was like, 'Alright Gotti, let's do it." Despite this, DMX and Ja Rule did not officially end their feud until 2009, at VH1's Hip Hop Honors.

=== Feud with Jay-Z ===
When DMX partnered with Jay-Z and Ja Rule in Murder Inc., there was a feud between the two, which also contributed to the failure of the group and working together. According to reports, the feud started in the early 1990s after a rap battle between the two, which led to DMX's disdain for Jay-Z. Prior to DMX's death, the feud, although it had fizzled out over the years, was revived when DMX said in an Instagram video that he wanted to rap battle Jay-Z on Verzuz.

== Legal issues ==
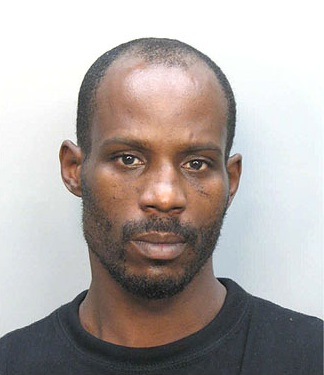
DMX's June 2008 mugshot

DMX was in jail more than 30 times throughout his lifetime for various offenses, including criminal possession of a weapon, robbery, assault, carjacking, animal cruelty, reckless driving, driving under the influence, unlicensed driving, drug possession, probation violation, failure to pay child support, pretending to be a federal agent, and tax evasion.

=== 1986–1988 ===
DMX was first sent to prison in 1986 after stealing a dog from a junkyard. He served a few months in the juvenile unit of Woodfield Prison in Valhalla, New York. Later that year, he was sentenced to two years for another crime and sent to Industry Institution in upstate New York. However, in December 1986, just a few days after starting his sentence, he and his cellmate successfully escaped the prison and DMX returned home until his mother forced him to turn himself in and finish his sentence, which he did at the MacCormick Secure Center, in Brooktondale, New York. Simmons was sent to prison again in 1988 for carjacking, and was later moved to a higher security prison after attempting to extort a fellow inmate for drugs. He was released in the summer of 1988.

=== 1998–1999 ===
- When officers of the Fort Lee Police Department executed a search of his home in 1999, DMX promptly surrendered himself on weapons possession charges.
- DMX faced a 1999 animal cruelty charge in Teaneck, New Jersey, after a dozen pit bulls were found at his home there; the charge was dismissed after the performer agreed to accept responsibility and record public service announcements for an animal rights group.

=== 2000–2005: Metro NY ===
- In 2000, DMX served a 15-day jail sentence for possession of marijuana.
- DMX served another jail sentence in 2001 for driving without a license and possession of marijuana. His appeal to reduce the sentence was denied; rather, he was charged with assault for throwing objects at prison guards.
- In January 2002, DMX pleaded guilty in New Jersey to 13 counts of animal cruelty, two counts of maintaining a nuisance, and one count each of disorderly conduct and possession of drug paraphernalia. He eventually plea-bargained down to fines, probation, and community service and starred in public service announcements against the dangers of guns and animal abuse.
- In June 2004, DMX was arrested at the John F. Kennedy International Airport, on charges of cocaine possession, criminal impersonation, criminal possession of a weapon, criminal mischief, menacing, and driving under the influence of drugs or alcohol, while claiming to be a federal agent and attempting to carjack a vehicle. He was given a conditional discharge on December 8, 2004, but pleaded guilty on October 25, 2005, to violating parole.
- On November 18, 2005, DMX was sentenced to 70 days in jail at Rikers Island for violating parole; the lateness charge added a 10-day extension to the original 60-day sentence. DMX was released early (for "good behavior") on December 30, 2005.

=== 2007 ===
- In 2007, DMX's home in Arizona was raided on reports of animal cruelty to his 12 pitbulls on the property. Simmons maintained that any neglect was the result of a caretaker who was not taking proper supervision of the dogs.

=== 2008–2011: Arizona and California ===
- On May 9, 2008, DMX was arrested on drug and animal cruelty charges after attempting to barricade himself inside his home in Cave Creek, Arizona.
- DMX pleaded guilty to charges of drug possession, theft, and animal cruelty stemming from an August 2007 drug raid as well as the May 2008 arrest, at a hearing on December 30, 2008; he was sentenced to 90 days in jail on January 31, 2009.
- On May 22, 2009, DMX entered a plea agreement/change of plea and pleaded guilty to attempted aggravated assault in jail.
- After serving four out of six months for violating drug probation, DMX was released from jail on July 6, 2010. That day, a television pilot was filmed to portray his road to recovery; however, DMX was arrested three weeks later and the pilot did not evolve into a series.
- On July 27, 2010, DMX turned himself in to Los Angeles Metropolitan Court for a reckless driving charge he received in 2002. He was sentenced to serve ninety days in jail.
- On November 19, 2010, DMX was arrested in Maricopa County, Arizona, on charges of violating probation for a February 24, 2009, aggravated assault on an officer while he was incarcerated. On December 20, 2010, DMX was moved to the Mental Health Unit of the Arizona Alhambra State Prison, and released on July 18, 2011.
- On August 24, 2011, DMX was arrested for the tenth time in Maricopa County, this time for speeding, recorded at 102 miles per hour (164 km/h) in a 65-mile-per-hour (105 km/h) zone, reckless driving, and driving with a suspended license. While DMX admitted to speeding, he claimed he was driving 85 miles per hour (137 km/h).

=== 2013: South Carolina ===
- On February 13, 2013, DMX was arrested in Spartanburg, South Carolina, for driving without a driver's license.
- On July 26, 2013, DMX was arrested again in Greenville County, South Carolina, and charged with driving under the influence of alcohol as well as driving without a license.
- On August 20, 2013, DMX was arrested again in Greer, South Carolina, during a traffic stop after a car he was a passenger in made an improper u-turn. He was arrested due to an outstanding warrant for driving under suspension. Four packages of marijuana were also found in the vehicle, and he along with the driver were cited for them.
- On November 4, 2013, DMX was again arrested by the Greenville–Spartanburg International Airport police near Greer, South Carolina, after police, who were familiar with his prior arrests, noticed DMX behind the wheel of a vehicle at the terminal. DMX was booked on charges of driving with a suspended license, having an uninsured vehicle, and driving an unlicensed vehicle. He was subsequently released after spending three hours in jail.

=== 2015: New York ===
- On April 5, 2015, a man accused DMX of robbing him.
- On June 26, 2015, DMX was arrested in New York and charged in Newark, New Jersey, with robbery and failure to pay child support.
- On July 14, 2015, DMX was sentenced to six months in jail for failure to pay $400,000 in child support.
- On December 14, 2015, an arrest warrant was issued for DMX after he missed a court hearing to address child support issues with his ex-wife Tashera Simmons and their four children.

=== 2017–2019: Tax fraud conviction ===
In July 2017, DMX was charged with 14 federal counts of tax fraud. Federal prosecutors charged him with failing to file income tax returns from 2010 to 2015 (a period when he earned at least $2.3 million). DMX pleaded guilty to a single count of tax fraud in November 2017. DMX was originally free pending sentencing but was remanded to jail in January 2018 after leaving a drug treatment program ordered by the court and relapsing with cocaine and oxycodone. In March 2018, Judge Jed S. Rakoff sentenced DMX to one year in prison followed by three years of supervised release. The court also ordered DMX to pay $2.29 million in restitution to the government. He was released from prison on January 25, 2019.

== Health problems and death ==
Simmons claimed he became addicted to crack cocaine when he was 14 years old, after Ready Ron tricked him into smoking a joint laced with the drug. Ready Ron denied this claim in a social media post after Simmons's death.

Simmons entered drug rehabilitation several times including in 2002, 2017, and 2019, when he canceled concerts.

On February 10, 2016, Simmons was found unresponsive in a parking lot at a Ramada Inn in Yonkers, New York. He was resuscitated by first responders and intravenously given Narcan, an opioid-reversal drug; he responded quickly and became semi-conscious. Simmons was subsequently rushed to the hospital. A witness said he ingested a powdered substance before collapsing, but police found no illegal substances on the property. Simmons stated that it was from an asthma attack.

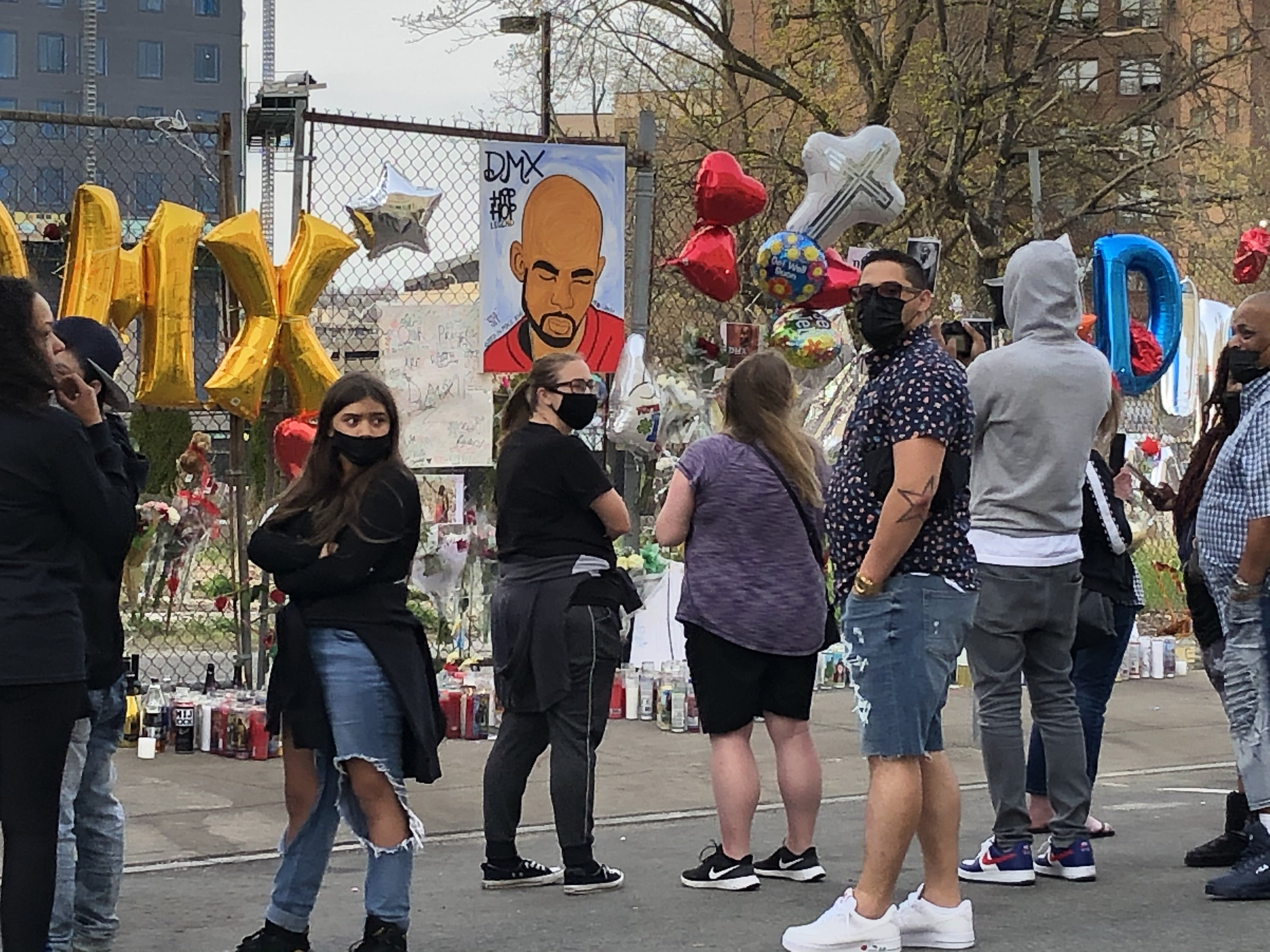
DMX shrine outside White Plains Hospital, where he died

On April 2, 2021, at approximately 11:00 p.m., Simmons was rushed to White Plains Hospital, where he was reported to be in critical condition following a heart attack at his home. Simmons suffered cerebral hypoxia as paramedics attempted to resuscitate him for 30 minutes. The next day, his attorney Murray Richman confirmed Simmons was on life support. Simmons's former manager, Nakia Walker, said he was in a "vegetative state" with "lung and brain failure and no current brain activity". His manager, SRC and Loud Records founder Steve Rifkind, stated Simmons was comatose and that he was set to undergo tests to determine his brain's functionality and his family will "determine what's best from there".

On the morning of April 9, 2021, Simmons lost functionality in multiple essential organs, reportedly his liver, kidneys, and lungs, and died shortly after, at age 50. It was revealed on July 8 by the Westchester County Medical Examiner's Office that Simmons's official cause of death was a heart attack. He is buried at Oakland Cemetery in Yonkers.

== Legacy ==
"Throughout his nearly three-decade career, DMX came to embody passion, rawness, and pure emotional honesty like few hip-hop artists ever have, barking his way through hits like "Ruff Ryders' Anthem" and "Get at Me Dog" one moment, and repenting and philosophizing on tracks like "Slippin'" the next. His was a decidedly anti-commercial approach, but it worked, and it made him the genre's first new superstar in the wake of the killings of Tupac Shakur and the Notorious B.I.G. To this day, few have been able to reach the heights he did—he's the only rapper to have his first five studio albums debut at no. 1, and he was the first living hip-hop artist to have two projects go platinum in the same year."

— The Ringer wrote upon DMX's death

Various celebrities paid tribute through outlets like social media including former NFL player Torrey Smith, LeBron James, Shaquille O'Neal, Eminem, Gabrielle Union (who co-starred with DMX in the 2003 film Cradle 2 the Grave, along with Jet Li, who also paid tribute), Backstreet Boys member AJ McLean, Wyclef Jean, Swizz Beatz (who DMX collaborated with including on the hit single, "Ruff Ryders' Anthem"), Eve and Missy Elliott. Other tributors included Kelly Rowland, Chris Brown, Lil Durk, Big Sean, Polo G, Metro Boomin, The Weeknd, T.I., Jim Jones, Busta Rhymes, Viola Davis, Ellen DeGeneres, Mary J. Blige, Al Sharpton, Angie Martinez, Ciara, Jennifer Love Hewitt, and various others.

A "Celebration of Life" took place on April 24, 2021, led by Kanye West's Sunday Service Choir. They performed several songs in honor of DMX. The memorial took place at Barclays Center in Brooklyn with a limited capacity of 1,900. It was livestreamed on DMX's YouTube and Instagram accounts. On the way to Barclays, DMX's casket was carried by a black monster truck with "Long live DMX" painted on the side. A procession of hundreds of motorcyclists, in homage to the hip-hop collective Ruff Ryders, rode from DMX's birthplace of Yonkers, New York to Barclays Center. In between performances, people gave speeches including Eve, Nas, Swizz Beatz and Ruff Ryders founders Joaquin "Waah" Dean & Darin "Dee" Dean.

DMX's funeral ("DMX's Homegoing Celebration") took place in Brooklyn at the Christian Cultural Center on April 25, 2021. It was livestreamed on the BET Network and its YouTube channel. It lasted around five hours to a limited capacity of 2,000 people. DMX's casket was in the color red and featured the word "FAITH" in large printing. It was featured in the front of the room. People who were in attendance included Nas, Lil Kim, Alicia Keys and Swizz Beatz as well as the pastor of the church, Reverend A.R. Bernard. Louis Farrakhan, a leader of the Nation of Islam, joined the service via Zoom. With the exception of Alicia Keys, Nas and Lil Kim, they all gave speeches. DMX's former wife, Tashera Simmons and Ruff Ryders founders Waah & Dee also gave a speech. There was some controversial testimonies like former Def Jam chief Lyor Cohen, when his video featured an overhead view of a beach and explained how Earl Simmons was a wonderful man while DMX was a gremlin. Additionally, Def Jam cofounder Russell Simmons compared his own issues with drug abuse to DMX via video. The homegoing ended with DMX's obituary read on stage and a virtual performance from Faith Evans.

At the funeral, New York City community leader and peacemaker Erica Ford presented DMX's family several citations and proclamations from the New York governor's and Senate's office, including a proclamation from the New York state Senate declaring December 18—DMX's birthday—"Earl 'DMX' Simmons Day." Additional citations came from Gov. Andrew Cuomo and Mayor Mike Spano of Yonkers (the hometown of DMX). Cuomo had the flag flying over the state capitol on the day of DMX's death presented to his family.

On June 28, 2021, his music was represented by former Def Jam labelmate Method Man, close friend Swizz Beatz, Busta Rhymes and actor Michael K. Williams at the BET Awards 2021.

On May 27, 2026, the Yonkers City Council passed a unanimous vote to rename School Street and Brooke Street as "Earl DMX Simmons Way."

=== Impact ===
DMX had a significant impact on hip hop music and is considered a "legend" in the genre. He's credited for having "defined 2000s rap" and for being "among the most prolific rappers of his era". He broke and set numerous records. His early work was vastly different from most mainstream hip hop music at the time; while Puff Daddy and other artists of the Bad Boy Records label were at the height of popularity, characterized by their "big-budget videos, lavish party-throwing, and dancefloor-ready music", DMX achieved success with a more dark, aggressive, "rugged", less "marketable" style.

According to an Apple Music radio host: "It was a complete 180...Puff was controlling the clubs; you were watching Bad Boy Records pop bottles, wear Rolexes, Jesus pieces, Coogi sweaters. Then here comes this crazy energetic figure from Yonkers with the Timbs and the bandanas, running around with pitbulls, giving a perspective on the streets that a lot of people weren't familiar with and taking command of what hip-hop didn't look like." DMX's commercially successful violent lyricism helped popularize the horrorcore genre.

=== Unreleased recordings ===
In late August 2026, Billboard published an article about a vast archive of never-before-released early-DMX-career recordings, VHS videos, cassette tapes, handwritten lyrics, and other artifacts held by DMX's longtime friend and Yonkers collaborator, Michael Murray (known as "DJ Superior"). DJ Superior says that he co-owns the materials, which he co-wrote and co-rapped in his Yonkers apartment; he also produced many of them on his own equipment. He has held and preserved the large trove of materials for decades, dating to DMX's early career. DJ Superior had revealed years earlier in an interview that he had the hours of unseen footage, as well as dozens of unreleased tracks.

Wanting to share and sell the materials publicly, DJ Superior had contacted the executors of the DMX estate, and proposed that he would hand over to them all of the unreleased recordings, to be digitized and released, and grant the estate an 80% share of the profits from their sale. However, threats by the executors of a legal dispute have so far blocked the release of the recordings to the public. Because the executors were not satisfied with receiving 80% of the profits from the sale of DJ Superior's unreleased materials, they demanded that DJ Superior completely surrender his copyright ownership rights to the materials, and also significantly reduce his cut of the sales—and threatened to sue DJ Superior if he releases the music and videos to the public.

DJ Superior retained counsel, who noted separately—after an investigation—that DJ Superior is also the legal co-author of at least 10 DMX songs, including the 1998 hit "Get at Me Dog".

== Discography ==
Studio albums

- It's Dark and Hell Is Hot (1998)
- Flesh of My Flesh, Blood of My Blood (1998)
- ... And Then There Was X (1999)
- The Great Depression (2001)
- Grand Champ (2003)
- Year of the Dog... Again (2006)
- Undisputed (2012)
- Exodus (2021)

== Awards and nominations ==
Grammy Award

Year	Nominated work	Award	Result
2001	... And Then There Was X	Best Rap Album	Nominated
2001	"Party Up (Up in Here)"	Best Rap Solo Performance	Nominated
2002	"Who We Be"	Best Rap Solo Performance	Nominated
2022	"Bath Salts" (with Nas & Jay-Z)	Best Rap Song	Nominated

American Music Award

Year	Nominated work	Award	Result
2000	DMX	Favorite Rap/Hip-Hop Artist	Won
2001	DMX	Favorite Rap/Hip-Hop Artist	Nominated

MTV Video Music Award

Year	Nominated work	Award	Result
1999	"Ruff Ryders' Anthem"	Best Rap Video	Nominated
2000	"Party Up (Up in Here)"	Best Rap Video	Nominated
2001	"No Sunshine"	Best Video from a Film	Nominated
2002	"Who We Be"	Best Rap Video	Nominated
2002	"Who We Be"	Best Breakthrough Video	Nominated
2006	"Touch It (Remix)"	Best Rap Video	Nominated
2006	"Touch It (Remix)"	Best Male Video	Nominated

Billboard Music Award

Year	Nominated work	Award	Result
1999	DMX	Top R&B Album Artist of the Year	Won

== Filmography ==
Films

Year	Title	Role	Notes
1998	Belly	Tommy "Buns" Bundy	
2000	Romeo Must Die	"Silk"	
2000	Backstage	Himself	
2000	Boricua's Bond	Himself	
2001	Exit Wounds	Leon Rollins / Latrell Walker	
2003	Cradle 2 the Grave	Anthony Fait	
2004	Never Die Alone	David "King David"	
2006	Father of Lies	Paul	Direct-to-DVD
2007	Death Toll	"The Dog"	Direct-to-DVD
2008	Last Hour	Jack "Black Jack"	Direct-to-DVD
2008	Lords of the Street	Thorn	Originally titled Jump Out Boys
2009	Lockjaw: Rise of the Kulev Serpent	Nick	Direct-to-DVD
2009	The Bleeding	"Tagg"	Direct-to-DVD
2013	King Dog	Terrell "T.J." Johnson	Direct-to-DVD
2013	Blame It on the Hustle	—	Direct-to-DVD
2014	Top Five	Himself	Cameo appearance
2014	Journey to Sundance	Himself	Documentary
2017	Can't Stop, Won't Stop: A Bad Story	Himself	Documentary
2018	Pimp	John "Midnight John"	
2018	The After Party	Himself	Cameo
2019	Beyond the Law	Detective Ray Munce	
2020	Fast and Fierce: Death Race	Davie	
2020	Chronicle of a Serial Killer	Detective White	
2021	DMX: Don't Try to Understand	Himself	Documentary; posthumous
2025	In Whose Name?	Himself	Documentary; posthumous

Video games

Year	Title	Role	Notes
2002	Street Hoops	Himself	Vocals
2003	Def Jam Vendetta	Himself	Voice role and likeness

Television

Year	Title	Role	Notes
1998	The Chris Rock Show	Himself	
2000	Moesha	Himself	"Gimme a Break" (season 5, episode 18)
2000–2002	MadTV	Himself	2 episodes
2002	Half & Half	Himself	"The Big Sistah Sans Soul" (season 1, episode 7)
2003	Third Watch	"Kandid" Jones	"In Lieu of Johnson" (season 5, episode 92)
2003	Eve	Xenon	"She Snoops to Conquer" (season 1, episode 3)
2003	$2 Bill	Himself	"Episode DMX, Method Man and Ludacris"
2004	Chappelle's Show	Himself	Music Guest (season 2, episode 16)
2004	Jimmy Kimmel Live!	Himself	Season 3, episode 57
2004	The Sharon Osbourne Show	Himself	
2005	Trippin'	Himself	2 episodes
2006	DMX: Soul of a Man	Himself	Documentary
2008	Big Pun: The Legacy	Himself	Documentary
2011	Lifechangers	Himself	2 episodes
2012	Couples Therapy	Himself	Documentary
2013	Iyanla, Fix My Life	Himself	"Fix My Rap Star Life" (season 2, episode 1)
2015	Fresh Off the Boat	Himself	Season 2, episode 9
2017	Black Ink Crew	Himself	Season 5, episode 14

== See also ==
- Ruff Ryders
- Murder Inc.
