= Undisputed (DMX album) =

Studio album by DMX
- Released: September 11, 2012
- Recorded: November 2009–January 2012
- Studios: Saltmine Studio Oasis (Mesa, Arizona); Bishop Powerhouse Studios (Yonkers, New York)
- Length: 54:41
- Label: Seven Arts
- Producers: DMX (exec.); Dame Grease (also exec.); Bird; Caviar; Deezle; Divine Bars; Elite; J.R. Rotem; Snaggs; Snaz; Swizz Beatz; Tronzilla

DMX chronology
The Weigh In (2012)	Undisputed (2012)	Exodus (2021)

Singles from Undisputed
- 1. "I Don't Dance" Released: April 7, 2012; 2. "Head Up" Released: September 4, 2012

Undisputed is the seventh studio album by American rapper DMX, his first studio album in six years since Year of the Dog... Again (2006) and the last to be released during his lifetime. It was released on September 11, 2012, on Seven Arts Music. DMX donated the first-week sales of the album to the victims of the 9/11 attacks. It sold 17,000 copies in its first week.

== Background ==
On October 11, 2011, DMX performed at the 2011 BET Hip Hop Awards. He stated that he has been working "nonstop, every day" on the new album, and plans to release it before December 2012. During a performance at New York City's Santos Party House on December 25, 2011, DMX stated that the new album will be entitled Undisputed and would be released on March 26, 2012. This was later confirmed by DMX via his official Twitter account, where he also confirmed that its first single is scheduled for release in January 2012. A video for a new track entitled "Last Hope" was released via the Internet on September 24, 2011. This was later released on his The Weigh In EP and omitted from the final release of Undisputed.

Seven Arts Entertainment Inc. recently purchased by David Michery music assets, which included some of DMX's music. DMX's had announced that Undisputed will be released on March 27, 2012. However it was later revealed that DMX did not plan to release the album on that date, and that date was one forced upon him by the record label. The release date for the album was set for June 26, 2012. However, DMX announced in Detroit, Michigan, on June 9, 2012, that due to the record label, the date will be pushed back again. It was then scheduled for release on August 28, 2012. Later, an official press release from the label pushed the back date to September 11, 2012. He donated the album's first week sales to the victims of the September 11 attacks. The album features only one male guest appearance by rapper Machine Gun Kelly. The album was also supposed to feature Sean Kingston, Tyrese Gibson and Busta Rhymes, but none of these artists were featured in the final cut.

=== Themes and regional connections ===
On Undisputed, DMX heavily revisits themes of street adversity, strength, and survival, which critics noted as a reflection of the aggressive lyrical style shaped by his upbringing in Yonkers, New York. The project serves as a sonic return to his Yonkers roots, relying on production from long-time East Coast collaborators and fellow Ruff Ryders veterans Dame Grease and Swizz Beatz to recapture his New York hip-hop sound.

== Release and promotion ==
On May 15, 2012, DMX and Dame Grease released a pre-album EP which would be free for download, called The Weigh-In featuring artists such as Snoop Dogg, Big Stan, and Tyrese. It also featured production from West Coast rapper and producer Dr. Dre. Promoting his album, DMX announced the Undisputed Tour, with 15 concerts, across the United States throughout June and early July 2012.

=== Singles ===
On January 6, 2012, DMX performed live the first single of the album, "I Don't Dance" featuring MGK in Long Beach. It was released on iTunes on April 7, 2012. DMX shot a video for the song, also featuring MGK. He also released a behind-the-scenes video. The official video premiered on MTV Jams on June 23, 2012, and was later uploaded to his YouTube account. Xzibit made a cameo appearance. DMX released the second single, "Head Up", on September 4, 2012.

== Critical reception ==
Professional ratings
Review scores
Source	Rating
AllMusic	3/5 stars
RapReviews	6/10
The Versed	2.5/5 stars
XXL	3/5 stars

Upon its release, Undisputed received generally mixed reviews from music critics. Christopher Minaya of XXL said, "X provides more bark than bite this go-around, as he often leaves listeners yearning for more lyrically while the selection of beats is open to discussion as many are up to snuff at best. Peaking so early in his career was a gift to his legacy but a curse to his longevity. As a result, fans understandably expect another "Party Up (Up In Here)," yet "I Don't Dance" is simply not that. Undisputed exhibits little of X's impressive illustration but renews the high level of passion and energy he excels at relaying to listeners. X has been staying out of trouble, making it to shows and has improved his raps since The Weigh In, a trend one can only wish continues." In a mixed review Ken Capobianco writing for the Boston Globe stated, "on his comeback after years of career self-destruction, he doesn’t come close to recapturing the intensity and glorious contradictions of his best work. Despite some excellent beats from some of his Ruff Ryder heyday producers including Swizz Beatz, the MC struggles to tap into the menacing, confrontational bark that made him a star."

Pete T of RapReviews said, "the at-times triumphant return Undisputed wears many hats and dons most of them admirably. Here you'll find his trademark street anthems replete with horns and barking, desolate monologues toward a silent God, and endless exploration of a chronically conflicted character. He doesn't break much new ground, nor does he lend the sense that he's forcibly trying to reclaim past glory. Upon hearing the opener "What They Don't Know," an archetypal Swizz Beatz jam that stands among the best the duo ever concocted, it's almost impossible not to proclaim the return of the dog." Huffington Post labeled DMX as past his prime, but also said "The production on Undisputed is respectable with Swizz Beatz, J.R. Rotem, Dame Grease and Tronzilla laying down the tracks, but their efforts don't help the overall quality. Surprisingly, the most enjoyable songs aren't the hardcore ones. Instead, it's the R&B-flavored "Cold World" and "No Love"."

Rap Radar named it the fifth most disappointing album of 2012. Colton S. of TheVersed stated, "Overall, Undisputed, is an admirable effort from one of hip hop’s most esteemed, important, and interesting artists. As strange as it sounds, DMX is at his best here when he holds himself back a little and opens up about his personal struggles. Unfortunately, he only does that on a small handful tracks. Throughout the rest of the project we get some interesting, yet technically deficient religious songs, and some misguided attempts at some of the high-energy party anthems he became famous for."

== Commercial performance ==
Undisputed debuted at number 19 on the US Billboard 200, selling 17,000 copies, while making it to number two in Top R&B/Hip-Hop Albums.

== Production and recording ==
Recording sessions for the album Undisputed took place using tracking sessions in DMX's hometown of Yonkers, New York, at Bishop Powerhouse Studios, between November 2009 and January 2012. The sonic direction of the comeback album deliberately emphasized his local Yonkers roots.

== Track listing ==
Undisputed track listing
No.	Title	Writer(s)	Producer(s)	Length
1.	"Lookin' Without Seein'" (Intro)	Earl Simmons; Anthony Parrino	Elite	0:50
2.	"What They Don't Know"	Simmons; Kaseem Dean	Swizz Beatz	3:42
3.	"Cold World" (featuring Andreena Mill)	Simmons; Damon Blackman; Nick Zesses; Dino Fekaris	Dame Grease; Snaz	4:04
4.	"I Don't Dance" (featuring MGK)	Simmons; Richard Colson Baker; J.R. Rotem	Rotem	3:27
5.	"Sucka for Love" (featuring Dani Stevenson)	Simmons; Darius Harrison	Deezle	4:10
6.	"I Get Scared" (featuring Rachel Taylor)	Simmons; Blackman	Dame Grease	3:54
7.	"Slippin' Again"	Simmons; Gertis Lamont McDowell	Bird	3:47
8.	"Prayer" (Skit)	Simmons	X	1:42
9.	"I'm Back"	Simmons; McDowell; Leonard Caston Jr.; Pamela Sawyer; Frank Wilson	Bird	2:33
10.	"Have You Eva"	Simmons; Blackman; Barry Eastmond; Jolyon Skinner	Dame Grease	3:44
11.	"Get Your Money Up"	Simmons	Snaggs	2:21
12.	"Head Up"	Simmons; Maurice White	Tronzilla	4:31
13.	"Frankenstein"	Simmons; Kannon Cross; Gregory Ford, Jr.	Caviar; G'Sparkz	2:34
14.	"Ya'll Don't Really Know"	Simmons; Dean	Swizz Beatz	2:38
15.	"I Got Your Back" (featuring Kashmir)	Simmons; Cross; Ford	Caviar; G'Sparkz	3:15
16.	"No Love" (featuring Andreena Mill)	Simmons; Blackman; Barry White	Dame Grease; Snaz	3:20
17.	"Already"	Simmons; Pat Gallo	Divine Bars	3:59
Total length:				54:41

Deluxe edition
No.	Title	Writer(s)	Producer(s)	Length
18.	"Fire" (featuring Kashmir)	Simmons; Blackman	Dame Grease	3:13
19.	"Fuck U Bitch"	Simmons	Elite	2:59
20.	"Love That Bitch"	Simmons; Pat Gallo	Divine Bars	3:20

Notes

- "Get Your Money Up" is not available on any of the digital music services.
- "Already and "Love That B*tch" feature uncredited vocals by Jannyce.

Sample credits

- "I Got Your Back" contains a sample of "Ashley's Roachclip" as performed by The Soul Searchers.
- "I'm Back" contains a sample of "Loving You the Second Time Around" as performed by Eddie Kendricks.
- "No Love" contains a sample of "Our Theme (Part II)" as performed by Barry White & Glodean White.
- "Cold World" contains a sample of "Mother Nature" as performed by The Temptations.
- "Have You Eva" contains a sample of "Have You Ever Loved Somebody" as performed by Freddie Jackson.
- "Head Up" contains an interpolation of "Keep Your Head to the Sky" as performed by Earth, Wind & Fire.
- "Fire" contains a sample of "Put Out My Fire" as performed by Lamont Dozier.

== Personnel ==
Credits for Undisputed adapted from Allmusic.

- Robert Cardenas – Graphic Direction, Layout
- Marz Castro – Images
- Caviar – Mixing
- R. Colson – Composer
- Kannon "Caviar" Cross – Producer
- Dame Grease – Producer
- Snaz – Producer
- DMX – Primary Artist
- Charles Dorman – Instrumentation, Keyboards, Strings
- Barry Eastmond – Composer
- Gregory Ford Jr. – Composer
- Jason Fowler – Management
- Pat Gallo – Producer
- Patrick Gallo – Composer
- Brian "Big Bass" Gardner – Mastering
- Bob Gotti – A&R
- John Gray – Editing, Engineer, Mixing
- Darius Deezle Harrison – Producer
- Ronnie Jones – Marketing, Promoter
- Peter Karroll – Executive Producer
- Kashmere – Featured Artist
- Kannon Kross – Composer
- Jason Levine – Editing, Engineer, Mixing
- Machine Gun Kelly – Featured Artist
- Gertis Lamont McDowell – Composer
- David Michery – Executive Producer
- Greg Miller – Marketing, Promoter
- Adreena Mills – Featured Artist
- Cale Moss – Concept
- Jordon Nuttall – Photography
- Jonathan Rivera – Composer
- J.R. Rotem – Producer
- Colin Rothwell – Assistant Engineer
- Don Salter – Quotation Author
- Phil Schlemmer – Engineer, Sound Effects
- Earl Simmons – Composer
- Jolyon Skinner – Composer
- Dani Stevenson – Featured Artist
- Swizz Beatz – Producer
- Morris J. Tancredi – Composer
- Rachel Taylor – Featured Artist
- Joe Warlick – Editing, Engineer, Mixing
- Barry White – Composer
- Maurice White – Composer
- Jason Whittington – Marketing, Promoter
- Ashley Williams – Vocals

== Charts ==
Chart performance for Undisputed
Chart (2012)	Peak position
US Billboard 200	19
US Top R&B/Hip-Hop Albums (Billboard)	2
