= Exodus (DMX album) =

EXODUS 1:7

Studio album by DMX
- Released: May 25, 2021
- Recorded: September 2020–January 2021
- Studios: Beach City Music; (Inglewood, California); Lattitude Studio South; (Leiper's Fork, Tennessee)
- Genres: Hip-hop; East Coast hip-hop
- Length: 39:43
- Labels: Bloodline; Ruff Ryders; Def Jam
- Producers: Swizz Beatz; AraabMuzik; Jerry "Wonda" Duplessis; Keyz; Avenue Beatz; Mr. Porter; AYO LUCKY; Nasri Atweh; Kanye West

DMX chronology
Undisputed (2012)	EXODUS 1:7 (2021)

Singles from Exodus
- 1. "Hood Blues" Released: May 25, 2021

Exodus (also known as EXODUS 1:7) is the eighth and final studio album by American rapper DMX. It was released on May 28, 2021, through Ruff Ryders Entertainment, Bloodline Records, and Def Jam Recordings. It is DMX's first studio album in nine years since Undisputed (2012), and is also his only posthumous project released. The album's track "Bath Salts" featuring Jay-Z and Nas was nominated for Best Rap Song at the 64th Annual Grammy Awards.

== Background ==
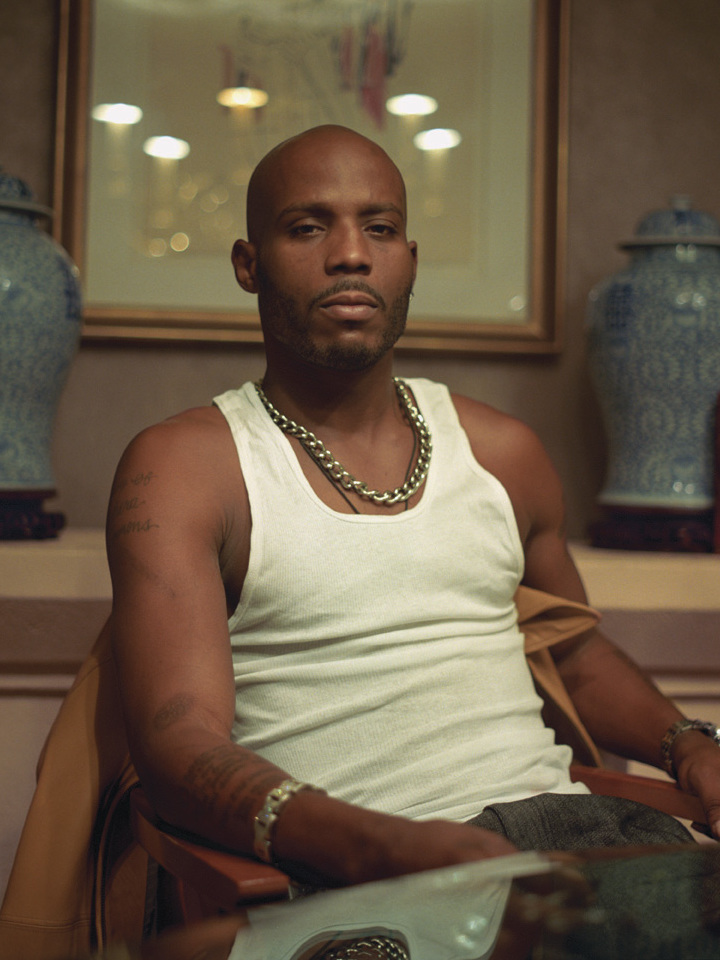
DMX was pronounced dead in April 2021.

On April 2, 2021, at approximately 11:00 pm, DMX was rushed to White Plains Hospital, where he was reported to be in critical condition following a heart attack at his home possibly resulting from a drug overdose. The next day, his attorney Murray Richman confirmed Simmons was on life support. That same night, Simmons suffered cerebral hypoxia (oxygen deprivation to his brain) as paramedics attempted to resuscitate him for 30 minutes. Simmons's former manager, Nakia Walker, said he was in a "vegetative state" with "lung and brain failure and no current brain activity". His manager, Steve Rifkind, stated Simmons was comatose and that he was set to undergo tests to determine his brain's functionality and his family would "determine what's best from there".

Work had commenced on Exodus prior to the death of DMX. He recorded Exodus in American rapper Snoop Dogg's studio, in Los Angeles, California. Swizz Beatz is the executive producer of the album. During the recording of the album, DMX would only record in the daytime, according to Swizz Beatz.

You need him during the daytime. The nighttime is just — a lot of things are probably on his mind at that time. A lot of people gathered around him. So I liked to catch him before that. It was like a job. We hadn’t done something like this for over 13 years, that type of togetherness in the studio every day.

— Swizz Beatz, The New York Times

Musicians Bono, Griselda, and Lil Wayne, as well as DMX's daughter, Sonovah, appear on the album. Late rapper Pop Smoke was set to appear on the album, but his verse ended up being used in a different song. Following DMX's death, his Instagram account released a post with the caption "5/28 The Legacy continues....#ExodusAlbum". The album shares its title with DMX's son and its cover was shot by photographer Jonathan Mannion. Its track listing was revealed on May 14, 2021, by Swizz Beatz on Instagram.

== Release ==
On April 9, 2021, the day of DMX's death, the song "X Moves" was released. On April 16, the song "Been to War" by DMX along with Swizz Beatz and French Montana was released as part of the soundtrack for the television series Godfather of Harlem. On May 25, the album's first official single, "Hood Blues" was released, which contains features from Buffalo, New York rappers Westside Gunn, Benny the Butcher, and Conway the Machine, credited as Griselda. Exodus was released on May 28, 2021.

== Critical reception ==
Professional ratings
Aggregate scores
Source	Rating
AnyDecentMusic?	6.5/10
Metacritic	71/100
Review scores
Source	Rating
AllMusic	3/5 stars
Clash	8/10
The Guardian	4/5 stars
NME	3/5 stars
Pitchfork	5.8/10
Rolling Stone	3/5 stars

Exodus received generally positive reviews from critics. At Metacritic, which assigns a normalized score out of 100 to ratings from publications, the album received a mean score of 71 based on 11 reviews, indicating "generally favorable reviews".

Alexis Petridis gave Exodus a positive review, remarking that the album "feels far more like a bold restatement of core values than an attempt to follow trends". However, he criticized certain parts of the album for being "strangely bleak". Will Lavin of NME gave the album another positive review, calling it "a wonderful tribute record loaded with stellar individual moments", although he criticized the album for being "a little unfinished at times". Robin Murray of Clash praised the album, calling it "an unbearably poignant listen at times, with meditations on loss and allegories for death at every corner".

Jeff Ihaza of Rolling Stone gave Exodus a mixed response. He gave positive remarks on DMX's rapping and the production by Swizz Beatz, calling the latter the "most dynamic...of his career". On the contrary, he noted that the album "can't escape the reality it exists in" due to the fact that it was completed before the death of DMX. Providing an example, Ihaza said that it was "hard to listen to a song like 'Bath Salts'—featuring Jay-Z and Nas rapping about being successful billionaires" without feeling a tinge of despair over the death of DMX.

== Commercial performance ==
Exodus debuted at number eight on the US Billboard 200 with 32,000 album-equivalent units. It marks DMX's eighth top 10 album on the chart. The album received over 22 million on-demand streams in its first week.

== Track listing ==
Exodus track listing
No.	Title	Writer(s)	Producer(s) and Engineer(s)	Length
1.	"That's My Dog" (featuring The Lox and Swizz Beatz)	Earl Simmons; Jason Phillips; David Styles; Sean Jacobs; Kasseem Dean; Abraham Orellana	Swizz Beatz; AraabMuzik	5:06
2.	"Bath Salts" (featuring Jay-Z and Nas)	Simmons; Shawn Carter; Nasir Jones; Dean; Michael "Prime Maximus" Forno	Swizz Beatz; Prime Maximus	3:00
3.	"Dogs Out" (featuring Lil Wayne and Swizz Beatz)	Simmons; Dwayne Carter, Jr.; Dean; Orellana; Anslem Douglas; Osbert Gurley	Swizz Beatz; AraabMuzik	2:45
4.	"Money Money Money" (featuring Moneybagg Yo)	Simmons; Demario White, Jr.; Dean; Jean-Jacques Debout; Huard Dumas; Pierre Porte	Swizz Beatz; Courtney "AyooiNk" Jenkins	2:08
5.	"Hold Me Down" (featuring Alicia Keys)	Simmons; Alicia Augello-Cook; Dean	Swizz Beatz	3:39
6.	"Skyscrapers" (featuring Bono)	Simmons; Paul Hewson; Dean; Jerry "Wonda" Duplessis; Tyrone "Musicman Ty" Johnson; Arden "Keyz" Altino; Sean Fenton	Swizz Beatz; Wonda; Musicman Ty; Keyz^{[a]}	3:25
7.	"Stick Up Skit" (featuring Cross, Infrared and Icepick)	Simmons; Dean		0:47
8.	"Hood Blues" (featuring Westside Gunn, Benny the Butcher and Conway the Machine)	Simmons; Alvin Worthy; Jeremie Pennick; Demond Price; Dean; Avery "Avenue Beatz" Chambliss; Marlene Moore	Swizz Beatz; Avenue Beatz; Courtney "AyooiNk" Jenkins	4:36
9.	"Take Control" (featuring Snoop Dogg)	Simmons; Calvin Broadus; Denaun Porter; Dean; David Ritz; Marvin Gaye; Odell Brown	Mr. Porter; Swizz Beatz^{[a]}	3:50
10.	"Walking in the Rain" (featuring Nas, Exodus Simmons and Denaun)	Simmons; Jones; Porter; Dean; Tim Schoegje; Lucky Specht; Thomas Forbes	Mr. Porter; Swizz Beatz^{[a]}; Shroom^{[b]}	4:00
11.	"Exodus Skit"			0:20
12.	"Letter to My Son (Call Your Father)" (featuring Usher and Brian King Joseph)	Simmons; Usher Raymond IV; Brian King Joseph; Nasri Atweh; Dean; Johnson	Swizz Beatz; Musicman Ty	4:05
13.	"Prayer"	Simmons; Kanye West; Jahmal "BoogzDaBeast" Gwin; Derek Watkins	West; BoogzDaBeast^{[a]}; Fonzworth Bentley^{[a]}	2:02

Notes

- ^{^[a]} signifies a co-producer
- ^{^[b]} signifies an additional producer

Sample credits

- "Take Control" contains a sample from "Sexual Healing" performed by Marvin Gaye.
- "Hood Blues" contains a sample from "Shady Blues" performed by Lee Mason & His Orchestra.
- "That's My Dog" contains a sample from "Serious" performed by Joe Budden and Joell Ortiz.

== Charts ==
Chart performance for Exodus
Chart (2021)	Peak position
Belgian Albums (Ultratop Flanders)	76
Canadian Albums (Billboard)	26
Swiss Albums (Schweizer Hitparade)	36
US Billboard 200	8
US Top R&B/Hip-Hop Albums (Billboard)	4
