= We Right Here =

Single by DMX

from the album The Great Depression
- Released: August 14, 2001
- Recorded: 2000
- Genre: East Coast hip-hop
- Length: 4:29
- Label: Ruff Ryders; Def Jam
- Songwriter: Earl Simmons
- Producer: Black Key

DMX singles chronology
"No Sunshine" (2001)	"We Right Here" (2001)	"Who We Be" (2001)

"We Right Here" is a song by American hip hop recording artist DMX, released as the first single from his fourth album The Great Depression (2001).

== History ==
=== Production ===
The song shows the use of Pro Tools' ability to create voice masking and voice doubling. DMX does his vocals on the microphone, and then layers them over the top of his previously recorded audio track; this creates a hazed, mellow sound, much like that of someone rapping with a 40 a Day voice.

=== Music video ===
The music video was shot in Baltimore (unlike previous videos shot in New York City), and contains cameo appearances from The Lox.

== In popular culture ==
- The song is featured in the 2002 video game Test Drive: Overdrive.
- The song is featured in the beginning of Martin Lawrence Live: Runteldat.
- The song is featured in 2002 movie Ali G Indahouse.

== Chart performance ==
Chart (2001)	Peak position
Germany (GfK)	62
US Bubbling Under Hot 100 (Billboard)	17
US Hot R&B/Hip-Hop Songs (Billboard)	43
US Hot Rap Songs (Billboard)	8
