= Who We Be =

Single by DMX featuring Dustin Adams

from the album The Great Depression
- Released: September 25, 2001
- Recorded: 2001
- Studio: Chaton Studios, (Phoenix, Arizona)
- Genre: Hip-hop
- Length: 4:25
- Label: Ruff Ryders; Def Jam
- Songwriters: Earl Simmons; Mickey R. Davis
- Producers: Black Key; Melvin "Hip" Armstead

DMX singles chronology
"We Right Here" (2001)	"Who We Be" (2001)	"I Miss You" (2002)

Audio sample
- file; help

"Who We Be" is a song by American hip hop recording artist DMX, released as the second single from his fourth album The Great Depression (2001). The song peaked at number 60 on the Billboard Hot 100. It was nominated for the Grammy Award for Best Rap Solo Performance, but lost to "Get Ur Freak On" by Missy Elliott. An edited version was featured in the 2002 sports game Street Hoops.

== Music video ==
The music video was directed by Joseph Kahn and produced by Lanette Phillips and Stefan Belafonte, and it features DMX rapping the song from inside a prison cell.

== Track listing ==
Europe 12-inch single 33 ⅓ RPM

Side one
No.	Title	Length
1.	"Who We Be (LP Version)"

Side two
No.	Title	Length
1.	"Who We Be (Radio Edit)"
2.	"Who We Be (Instrumental)"

US 12-inch single

Side one
No.	Title	Length
1.	"Who We Be (Radio Edit)"
2.	"Who We Be (Album Version)"

Side two
No.	Title	Length
1.	"Who We Be (Instrumental)"
2.	"Who We Be (Acapella)"

United Kingdom CD/maxi single

No.	Title	Length
1.	"Who We Be (Radio Edit)"	4:19
2.	"We Right Here (Radio Edit)"	4:02
3.	"Who We Be (Explicit Version)"	4:48
4.	"We Right Here (Explicit Version)"	4:31

United Kingdom enhanced CD single

No.	Title	Length
1.	"Who We Be (LP Version)"	4:48
2.	"Who We Be (Radio Edit)"	4:26
3.	"We Right Here (LP Version)"	4:28
4.	"Who We Be - Video"

== Personnel ==
- Vocals: DMX, Dustin Adams
- Mastered by: Tony Dawsey
- Recorded by: Jaime Weddle and Otto D'Angolo
- Mixed by: Brian Stanley at The Hit Factory Criteria (Miami, Florida)
- Artwork [Design]: Akisia Grigsby
- Artwork [Direction]:- Akisia Grigsby, Earl "DMX" Simmons
- Photography: Vincent Soyez

== Charts ==
Chart (2001)	Peak position
Ireland (IRMA)	38
Scottish Singles Sales (Official Charts)	48
UK Hip Hop/R&B (Official Charts)	6
UK Singles (Official Charts)	34
US Billboard Hot 100	60
US Hot R&B/Hip-Hop Songs (Billboard)	16
US Hot Rap Songs (Billboard)	10
US Rhythmic Airplay (Billboard)	25
