= The Great Depression (DMX album) =

Studio album by DMX
- Released: October 23, 2001
- Recorded: July 2000–July 2001
- Genre: Hardcore hip hop
- Length: 72:02
- Labels: Ruff Ryders; Def Jam
- Producers: Darrin & Joaquin Dean (exec.); DMX (also exec.); Latarche Nas Collins (co-exec.); Just Blaze; Swizz Beatz; Dame Grease; PK; Black Key; Kidd Kold

DMX chronology
...And Then There Was X (1999)	The Great Depression (2001)	Grand Champ (2003)

Singles from The Great Depression
- 1. "We Right Here" Released: August 14, 2001; 2. "Who We Be" Released: September 25, 2001; 3. "I Miss You" Released: January 15, 2002

Professional ratings
Aggregate scores
Source	Rating
Metacritic	(62/100)
Review scores
Source	Rating
AllMusic	2.5/5 stars
Entertainment Weekly	B−
Los Angeles Times	3/4 stars
NME	2.5/5 stars
PopMatters	4/10 stars
Q	3/5 stars
RapReviews	(6.5/10)
Rolling Stone	2.5/5 stars
Spin	(6/10)
USA Today	3.5/4 stars

The Great Depression is the fourth studio album by American rapper DMX. It was released on October 23, 2001 by Ruff Ryders Entertainment and Def Jam Recordings. The production on the album was handled by multiple producers including Just Blaze, Dame Grease, Black Key and DMX himself. The album also features guest appearances by Stephanie Mills, Faith Evans and Mashonda.

The Great Depression was supported by three singles: "We Right Here", "Who We Be" and "I Miss You". The album demonstrated his continually strong allegiance with the Ruff Ryders. The album received generally mixed to positive reviews from music critics and was a commercial success. It debuted at number one on the US Billboard 200 chart, selling 440,000 copies in the first week. It became certified platinum in December of that same year.

== Singles ==
The Great Depression was supported by three singles. The first single, "We Right Here" was released on August 14, 2001. The single failed to chart on the Billboard Hot 100 but managed to peak at number 17 on the US Bubbling Under the Hot 100 chart. The single also peaked at number 43 on the US Hot R&B/Hip-Hop Songs and number eight on the US Hot Rap Songs charts respectively. The second single, "Who We Be" was released on September 25, 2001. Unlike the previous single, it peaked at number 60 on the US Billboard Hot 100 chart. The single also peaked at number 16 on the US Hot R&B/Hip-Hop Songs and number ten on the US Hot Rap Songs charts. The third single, "I Miss You" was released on January 15, 2002. The single peaked at number 86 on the Billboard Hot 100 chart. It also peaked at number 37 on the US Hot R&B/Hip-Hop Songs chart.

== Critical reception ==
The Great Depression received generally mixed to positive reviews from music critics. At Metacritic, which assigns a normalized rating out of 100 to reviews from professional publications, the album received an average score of 62, based on ten reviews.

== Commercial performance ==
The Great Depression debuted at number one on the US Billboard 200 chart, selling 440,000 copies in its first week. This became DMX's fourth US number one debut on the chart. In its second week, the album dropped to number three on the chart, selling an additional 214,000 copies. On December 14, 2001, the album was certified platinum by the Recording Industry Association of America (RIAA) for shipments of over one million copies in the US. As of October 2009, the album has sold 1,862,000 copies in the United States.

== Track listing ==
Credits adapted from the album's liner notes.

No.	Title	Writer(s)	Producer(s)	Length
1.	"Sometimes"	Earl Simmons	DMX	1:06
2.	"School Street"	Simmons; Damon Blackman	Dame Grease	3:01
3.	"Who We Be" (featuring Dustin Adams)	Simmons; Mickey Davis	Black Key; Melvin "Hip" Armstead (co.)	4:47
4.	"Trina Moe"	Simmons; Blackman	Dame Grease	4:02
5.	"We Right Here"	Simmons; Davis	Black Key	4:27
6.	"Bloodline Anthem"	Simmons; Brian Collins	DMX; Kidd Kold	4:25
7.	"Shorty Was da Bomb"	Simmons; Blackman	Dame Grease	5:12
8.	"Damien III"	Simmons; Anthony Fields	P.K.	3:21
9.	"When I'm Nothing" (featuring Stephanie Mills)	Simmons; Blackman; James Mtume; Reggie Lucas	DMX; Dame Grease; Black Key (co.)	4:33
10.	"I Miss You" (featuring Faith Evans)	Simmons; Collins	Kidd Kold	4:40
11.	"Number 11"	Simmons; Fields	P.K.	4:25
12.	"Pull Up" (Skit)	Thom Bell; Phil Hurtt	DMX	0:20
13.	"I'ma Bang"	Simmons; Justin Smith	Just Blaze	5:03
14.	"Pull Out" (Skit)	Bell; Hurtt	DMX	0:24
15.	"You Could Be Blind" (featuring Mashonda)	Simmons; Kasseem Dean	Swizz Beatz	4:34
16.	"The Prayer IV"	Simmons	DMX	1:42
17.	"A Minute for Your Son"	Simmons; Dean	Swizz Beatz	16:55 Tracks 12 & 14 were omitted from later pressings.

Notes

- "Who We Be" contains additional vocals by Dustin Adams.
- "Bloodline Anthem contains additional vocals by Dia.
- "A Minute For Your Son" contains 3 additional hidden songs "The Kennel", "Problem Child" & "Shit's Still Real"

Sample credits

- "When I'm Nothing" contains a sample of "Whatcha Gonna Do (with My Lovin')", written by James Mtume and Reggie Lucas, and performed by Stephanie Mills.
- "Pull Up" (Skit) and "Pull Out" (Skit) contain samples of "I'll Be Around (Whenever You Want Me)", written by Thom Bell and Phil Hurtt, and performed by The Spinners.

== Charts ==
=== Weekly charts ===
Weekly chart performance for The Great Depression
Chart (2001)	Peak position
Australian Albums (ARIA)	99
Australian Urban Albums (ARIA)	16
Canadian Albums (Billboard)	1
Canadian R&B Albums (Nielsen SoundScan)	1
Dutch Albums (Album Top 100)	25
European Top 100 Albums (Music & Media)	29
French Albums (SNEP)	69
German Albums (Offizielle Top 100)	10
Irish Albums (IRMA)	26
New Zealand Albums (RMNZ)	38
Scottish Albums (Official Charts)	36
Swiss Albums (Schweizer Hitparade)	60
UK Albums (Official Charts)	20
UK R&B Albums (Official Charts)	2
US Billboard 200	1
US Top R&B/Hip-Hop Albums (Billboard)	1

=== Year-end charts ===
Year-end chart performance for The Great Depression
Chart (2001)	Position
Canadian Albums (Nielsen SoundScan)	71
Canadian R&B Albums (Nielsen SoundScan)	16
Canadian Rap Albums (Nielsen SoundScan)	7
US Billboard 200	109
US Top R&B/Hip-Hop Albums (Billboard)	60

Chart (2002)	Position
Canadian R&B Albums (Nielsen SoundScan)	43
Canadian Rap Albums (Nielsen SoundScan)	22
US Billboard 200	86
US Top R&B/Hip-Hop Albums (Billboard)	39

== Certifications ==
Certifications for The Great Depression
Region	Certification	Certified units/sales
Canada (Music Canada)	Platinum	100,000^{^}
United Kingdom (BPI)	Gold	100,000^{*}
United States (RIAA)	Platinum	1,000,000^{^}
^{*} Sales figures based on certification alone.^{^} Shipments figures based on certification alone.
