= Decoded (memoir) =

Book by Jay Z

- The book's cover
- Author: Jay-Z
- Cover artist: Rodrigo Corral
- Language: English
- Subject: Autobiography
- Genre: Non-fiction
- Published: November 16, 2010 (hardcover); November 1, 2011 (paperback)
- Publication place: United States
- Media type: Print (hardcover and paperback)
- Pages: 336 (hardcover); 352 (paperback)
- ISBN: 1400068924

Decoded is the autobiography and memoir of rapper Jay-Z, published by Random House and released November 16, 2010 on hardcover and November 1, 2011, on paperback. The book combines lyrics, their explanations, anecdotes, reflections, and autobiographical information. Jay-Z explains three reasons he wanted to write the book; it being a case for hip-hop lyrics as poetry, tells a generational story turned into powerful experiences, and revolved as a story everyone can relate to.

== Summary ==
=== Narrative ===
The book follows very rough chronological order, while switching from current stories to Jay-Z's story of growing up in the Marcy Projects. The autobiographical portion focuses on growing up in poverty which led to him to drug dealing during the crack epidemic, fights, and a need to share the hustlers story during the beginnings in rap. His reflections on those harsh times shaped who he is and how artists are shaped by such experiences.

=== Celebrity life ===
Jay-Z explains the stresses of the rap industry and the celebrity life, while also trying to put it in perspective. He illustrates this point by explaining that when he and Puff Daddy were being charged with assault there were hundreds of cameras outside the courthouse of Puff Daddy's trial and the courthouse where the perpetrator of the World Trade Center bombing was being tried was empty.

=== Opinions and reflections ===
Along with the narrative, there is also a substantial portion of the book dedicated to Jay-Z's opinions and reflections, which are often illustrated with stories. Jay-Z expounds on his relationship with Barack Obama and his involvement in politics, as well as his thoughts on the Hurricane Katrina.

Jay-Z reflects on his life and especially his beginnings. He explains that he still considers himself a hustler, despite being a corporate billionaire now as founder of Roc-A-Fella Records. He continues and describes the comparisons between drug dealing, rapping, and boxing and how his life in the streets has molded who he is and no matter how he lives now, he still acknowledges his roots.

=== Lyrics ===
The book contains lyrics to thirty-six songs with some songs having only part of the song. Along with the lyrics, there are annotations and footnotes that Jay-Z writes to explain the lyrics to the reader. The explanations range from just explaining what a "brick" is to in depth analysis and explanation of lines that underscore the points that Jay-Z makes in his writing.

== Critical response ==
Most of the criticism is that the book is not personal enough and does not provide enough detail of Jay-Z's life. Simon Vozick-Levinson writes in Entertainment Weekly "Despite the career he has made out of rapping in the first person, Jay-Z is known for prizing privacy. His new book 'Decoded' may not erase that reputation." Although Vozick Levinson expands and reveals "it is nonetheless Shawn Carter's most honest airing of the experiences he drew on to create the mythic figure of Jay-Z," while giving the book a grade of A−.

Adam Bradley of Barnes & Noble criticizes the structure of the book because it is not organized by chronological order, but by subject as well as criticizes its lack of depth in some areas by explaining "At times, these subject-driven sections leave one dissatisfied with the level of revelation and reflection, such as in his cursory treatment of race relations."

== Plagiarism claims ==
On June 13, 2012, a lawsuit was filed in the United States District Court for the Central District of California accusing Jay-Z and coauthor Dream Hampton of copyright infringement and invasion of privacy for Decoded. The lawsuit, filed by Patrick White, also names Random House, the company that published Decoded. White alleges "In 2009, my personal computer was compromised, resulting in my personal work to be used in Jay-Z's book Decoded which was released in 2010." White is claiming that he was working on a book on his personal computer when it was compromised and when reading Decoded, he noticed a resemblance in "expressions/color/phrases, which correlates to my work." In the handwritten lawsuit, White alleges that he sought out Jay-Z and Dream Hampton, but they were unresponsive to his contact.
