= Jay-Z videography =

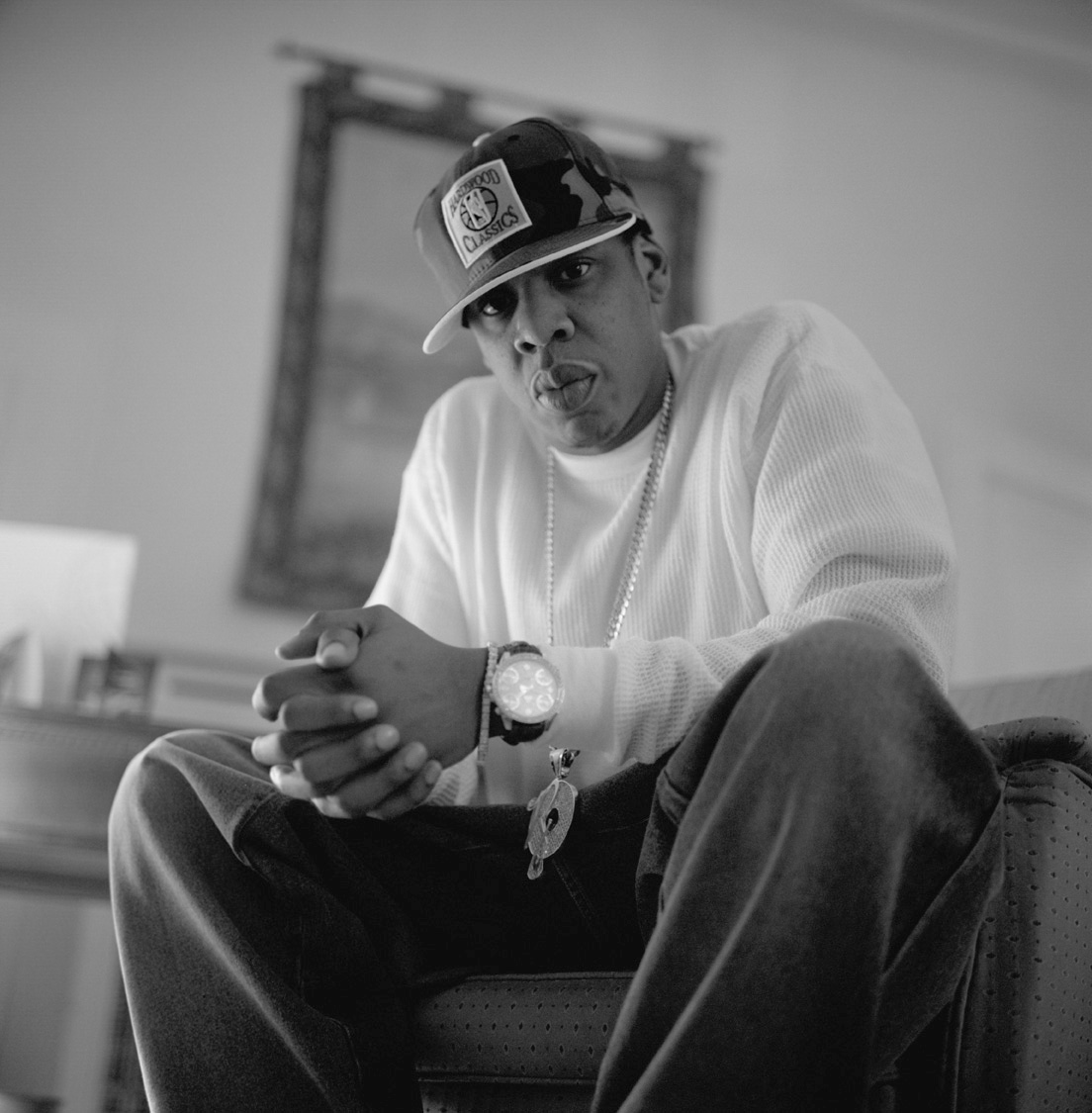
Jay-Z in 2003

This is the videography for American rapper Jay-Z. They often involve him performing.

== As lead artist ==
List of music videos as lead artist, showing year released and director
Title	Year	Director(s)
"I Can't Get Wid Dat"	1994	Abdul Malik Abbott
"In My Lifetime"	1995	Abdul Malik Abbott
"In My Lifetime" (Remix)	1995	Abdul Malik Abbott
"Dead Presidents"	1996	Abdul Malik Abbott
"Ain't No Nigga" (featuring Foxy Brown)	1996	Abdul Malik Abbott
"Can't Knock the Hustle" (featuring Mary J. Blige)	1996	Hype Williams
"Feelin' It"	1997	Alan Ferguson
"Who You Wit"	1997	Alan Ferguson
"(Always Be My) Sunshine" (featuring Babyface and Foxy Brown)	1997	Hype Williams
"The City Is Mine" (featuring Blackstreet)	1998	Steve Carr, Jay-Z
"Where I'm From"	1998	Abdul Malik Abbott
"Face Off" (featuring Sauce Money)	1998	Abdul Malik Abbott
"Friend or Foe '98"	1998	Abdul Malik Abbott
"Streets Is Watching"	1998	Abdul Malik Abbott
"Imaginary Player"	1998	Abdul Malik Abbott
"You Must Love Me" (featuring Kelly Price)	1998	Abdul Malik Abbott
"Wishing on a Star" (featuring Gwen Dickey)	1998	none
"It's Alright" (with Memphis Bleek)	1998	Little X
"Can I Get A..." (featuring Amil and Ja Rule)	1998	Steve Carr
"Hard Knock Life (Ghetto Anthem)"	1998	Steve Carr
"More Money, More Cash, More Hoes" (featuring Beanie Sigel, Memphis Bleek and DMX)	1999	Malik Sayeed
"Nigga What, Nigga Who (Originator 99)" (featuring Big Jaz and Amil)	1999	Malik Sayeed
"Girl's Best Friend" (featuring Mashonda)	1999	Francis Lawrence
"Do It Again (Put Ya Hands Up)" (featuring Beanie Sigel and Amil)	1999	Dave Meyers
"Anything"	2000	Chris Robinson
"Hey Papi" (featuring Memphis Bleek & Amil)	2000	Hype Williams
"Big Pimpin'" (featuring UGK)	2000	Hype Williams
"I Just Wanna Love U (Give It 2 Me)"	2000	Dave Meyers
"Change the Game" (featuring Beanie Sigel and Memphis Bleek)	2001	Dave Meyers
"Guilty Until Proven Innocent" (featuring R. Kelly)	2001	Paul Hunter
"Izzo (H.O.V.A.)"	2001	Dave Meyers
"Girls, Girls, Girls"	2001	Marc Klasfeld
"Song Cry"	2002	Sanaa Hamri
"'03 Bonnie & Clyde" (featuring Beyoncé)	2002	Chris Robinson
"Excuse Me Miss" (featuring Pharrell)	2003	Little X
"La-La-La (Excuse Me Again)"	2003	Chris Robinson
"Change Clothes" (featuring Pharrell)	2003	Chris Robinson
"Dirt Off Your Shoulder"	2004	Dave Meyers
"99 Problems"	2004	Mark Romanek
"Numb/Encore" (with Linkin Park)	2004	Joe DeMaio, Kimo Proudfoot
"Show Me What You Got"	2006	F. Gary Gray
"Lost One" (featuring Chrisette Michele)	2006	Anthony Mandler
"Minority Report" (featuring Ne-Yo)	2007	Jay-Z
"Blue Magic"	2007	Hype Williams
"Roc Boys (And the Winner Is...)"	2007	Chris Robinson
"I Know" (featuring Pharrell)	2008	Philip Andelman
"D.O.A. (Death of Auto-Tune)"	2009	Anthony Mandler
"Run This Town" (featuring Kanye West and Rihanna)	2009	Anthony Mandler
"Empire State of Mind" (featuring Alicia Keys)	2009	Hype Williams
"Young Forever" (featuring Mr Hudson)	2009	Anthony Mandler
"On to the Next One" (featuring Swizz Beatz)	2010	Sam Brown
"Otis" (with Kanye West)	2011	Spike Jonze
"Niggas in Paris" (with Kanye West)	2012	Kanye West
"No Church in the Wild" (with Kanye West, featuring Frank Ocean)	2012	Romain Gavras
"Picasso Baby"	2013	Mark Romanek
"Holy Grail" (featuring Justin Timberlake)	2013	Anthony Mandler
"Run (Part II (On The Run))" (featuring Beyoncé)	2014	Melina Matsoukas
"Glory"	2015	—N/a
"The Story of O.J."	2017	Mark Romanek, Jay-Z
"4:44"	2017	TNEG
"Bam" (featuring Damian Marley)	2017	Rohan Blair-Mangat
"Kill Jay Z"	2017	Gerard Bush, Christopher Renz
"Adnis"	2017	Mark Romanek
"Moonlight"	2017	Alan Yang
"ManyfaCedGod" (featuring James Blake)	2017	Francesco Carrozzini
"Dream. On"	2017	Mark Romanek
"Legacy"	2017	Jeymes Samuel
"Smile" (featuring Gloria Carter)	2017	Miles Jay
"Marcy Me"	2017	Ben and Joshua Safdie
"Family Feud" (featuring Beyoncé)	2017	Ava DuVernay
"Blue's Freestyle/We Family"	2018	Maurice Taylor
"Apeshit" (with Beyoncé as the Carters)	2018	Ricky Siaz

== As featured artist ==
List of music videos as featured artist, showing year released and director
Title	Year	Director(s)
"Hawaiian Sophie" (The Jaz featuring Jay-Z)	1989	Adam Bernstein
"The Originators" (The Jaz featuring Jay-Z)	1990	none
"Can I Get Open" (Original Flavor featuring Jay-Z)	1993	Eric Meyerson
"Show & Prove" (Big Daddy Kane featuring Scoob Lover, Sauce Money, Shyheim, Jay-Z and Ol' Dirty Bastard)	1994	Lionel C. Martin
"All of My Days" (Changing Faces featuring Jay-Z and R. Kelly)	1996	Cameron Casey
"I'll Be" (Foxy Brown featuring Jay-Z)	1997	Brett Ratner
"Love for Free" (Rell featuring Jay-Z)	1998	Free Spirit
"Money Ain't a Thang" (Jermaine Dupri featuring Jay-Z)	1998	Darren Grant
"4 Alarm Blaze" (M.O.P. featuring Teflon and Jay-Z)	1998	Brian Luvar
"Lobster & Scrimp" (Timbaland featuring Jay-Z)	1999	Steve Carr
"Heartbreaker" (Mariah Carey featuring Jay-Z)	1999	Brett Ratner
"What You Think of That" (Memphis Bleek featuring Jay-Z)	1999	none
"Kill 'Em All" (Ja Rule featuring Jay-Z)	1999	
"4 da Fam" (Amil featuring Jay-Z, Beanie Sigel and Memphis Bleek)	2000	Nick Quested
"Best of Me Part II" (Mýa featuring Jay-Z)	2000	Hype Williams
"Is That Your Chick (The Lost Verses)" (Memphis Bleek featuring Jay-Z, Twista and Missy Elliott)	2000	Jeremy Rall
"Do My..." (Memphis Bleek featuring Jay-Z)	2001	Dave Meyers, Jay-Z
"Fiesta" (Remix) (R. Kelly featuring Jay-Z)	2001	Little X, R. Kelly
"Think It's a Game" (Beanie Sigel featuring Young Chris, Freeway & Jay-z)	2001	
"What We Do" (Freeway featuring Jay-Z and Beanie Sigel)	2002	Nzingha Stewart
"Crazy in Love" (Beyoncé featuring Jay-Z)	2003	Jake Nava
"Frontin'" (Pharrell featuring Jay-Z)	2003	Paul Hunter
"Storm" (Remix) (Lenny Kravitz featuring Jay-Z)	2004	Sanaa Hamri
"Deja Vu" (Beyonce featuring Jay-Z)	2006	Sophie Muller
"Umbrella" (Rihanna featuring Jay-Z)	2007	Chris Applebaum
"Upgrade U" (Beyoncé featuring Jay-Z)	2007	Melina, Beyoncé
"Lost+" (Coldplay featuring Jay-Z)	2008	Mat Whitecross
"Money Goes, Honey Stay" (When the Money Goe$ Remix) (Fabolous featuring Jay-Z)	2009	Parris
"I Wanna Rock (King's G-Mix)" (Snoop Dogg featuring Jay-z)	2010	
"Monster" (Kanye West featuring Jay-Z, Rick Ross, Nicki Minaj and Bon Iver)	2010	Jake Nava
"Suit & Tie" (Justin Timberlake featuring Jay-Z)	2013	David Fincher
"Drunk in Love" (Beyoncé featuring Jay-Z)	2013	Hype Williams
"They Don't Love You No More" (DJ Khaled featuring Jay-Z, Meek Mill, Rick Ross and French Montana)	2014	Gil Green, DJ Khaled
"I Got the Keys" (DJ Khaled featuring Jay-Z and Future)	2016	Daniel Kaufman
"Entrepreneur" (Pharrell featuring Jay-Z)	2020	Calmatic
"Mood 4 Eva" (Beyonce featuring Jay-Z & Childish Gambino)	2021	Beyonce and Dikayl Rimmasch
"Sorry Not Sorry" (DJ Khaled featuring Nas, James Faunterloy & Jay-Z)	2022	DJ Khaled, Jay-Z and Hype Williams

== Filmography ==
Title	Year	Role(s)	Director	Notes	Ref.
Piece by Piece	2024	Himself (voice only)	Morgan Neville		

== Television ==
Title	Year	Role	Network	Notes	Ref.
Secret Millionaires Club	2011	Himself (voice only)	The Hub	Episode: "Be Cool To Your School"	
