= Kingz Kounty =

Studio album by Jaz-O & The Immobilarie
- Released: March 26, 2002
- Recorded: 2000–2002
- Studios: Baseline Studios (New York, NY); D&D Studios (New York, NY); Rancore Studios (New York, NY)
- Genre: Hip hop
- Length: 1:18:42
- Label: Rancore
- Producers: Jaz-O; DJ Premier; Zukhits; Craftworks; DR Period; Mafia Boy

Jaz-O chronology
| To Your Soul (1990) | Kingz Kounty (2002) |

The Immobilarie chronology
| Dibiase: Volume One (2000) | Kingz Kounty (2002) |

Singles from Kingz Kounty
- 1. "718" Released: 2000; 2. "Jinkin" Released: 2001; 3. "Let's Go!" Released: 2001; 4. "Love Is Gone" Released: 2002

Jaz-O & The Immobilarie Family Present: Kingz Kounty is the only collaborative studio album by American rapper and producer Jaz-O and hip hop group the Immobilarie. It was released on March 26, 2002 via D&D Records and Rancore Records. It featured guest appearances from Big Angie, DK, Grandmaster Caz, Jay-Z, M.O.P., Mr. Cheeks, POP Buchanan, Che Logan: Lochanan, P. Knocka, Floss Vegas, Shalom Melchizedek: ZUKHITS, ACE-Dibiase, Shareefah, and the HoodFellaz. The album debuted at number 100 on the Top R&B/Hip-Hop Albums chart and spawned two singles: "Let's Go" and "Love Is Gone", the latter peaking at number 20 on the Hot Rap Songs chart.

== Track listing ==
| No. | Title | Producer(s) | Length |
|---|---|---|---|
| 1. | "718" | DJ Premier | 4:03 |
| 2. | "Jinkin'" | Jaz-O | 3:44 |
| 3. | "This Be Him" | Zukhits | 3:39 |
| 4. | "Let's Go!" (featuring Jay-Z and Shareefah) | Jaz-O | 4:00 |
| 5. | "I Do" | Jaz-O | 3:36 |
| 6. | "Never Forget You" (featuring Shareefah) | Zukhits | 3:51 |
| 7. | "Take Me Papi" | Jaz-O | 4:00 |
| 8. | "All in the Game" (featuring The Hoodfellaz) | Craftworks | 4:32 |
| 9. | "The Best" (featuring Shareefah) | Jaz-O | 4:06 |
| 10. | "Live It Up!" (featuring DK) | Zukhits | 4:34 |
| 11. | "I Know What You Like" (featuring DK) | Jaz-O | 3:53 |
| 12. | "Slut" (featuring Big Angie and Grandmaster Caz) | Jaz-O | 4:01 |
| 13. | "Love Is Gone" | DJ Premier | 4:06 |
| 14. | "Diaries" | Jaz-O | 4:13 |
| 15. | "Heron & Crack (Just Say No)" | Zukhits | 5:36 |
| 16. | "Deadly" | Jaz-O | 4:19 |
| 17. | "Pledge Allegiance" (featuring M.O.P.) | Jaz-O | 4:04 |
| 18. | "Enemy Lines" | Craftworks | 4:36 |
| 19. | "B.Q.E." (featuring Mr. Cheeks) (Bonus) | DR Period; Mafia Boy | 3:49 |
| Total length: | | | 1:18:42 |
