= To Your Soul =

Studio album by the Jaz
- Released: July 16, 1990
- Studios: D&D (New York, NY); Calliope (New York, NY); Bayside (New York, NY)
- Genre: Hip hop
- Length: 51:54
- Label: EMI USA
- Producers: The Jaz; Chad Elliott; Vandy C; Prince Paul

The Jaz chronology
Word to the Jaz (1989)	To Your Soul (1990)	Kingz Kounty (2002)

To Your Soul is the second studio album by American rapper and producer the Jaz, from New York, New York. It was released on July 16, 1990, via EMI USA.

== Background ==
The album was recorded at D&D Studios, in New York City, New York, and was primarily produced by Jaz-O. The album also received production contributions from Prince Paul, Vandy C, and Chad Elliott. Jay-Z appears on two tracks. Its two singles, "The Originators" and "A Groove (This Is What U Rap 2)," peaked at No. 13 and No. 18, respectively, on the Hot Rap Songs chart.

== Critical reception ==
Joshua Clover, in his book 1989: Bob Dylan Didn’t Have This to Sing About, called the album "vital, serious, deeply musical, with playful lyrics that come at varying speeds, sometimes blunt and heavy on the beat, sometimes syncopated and sudden, looking for a way to slip past any defense."

== Track listing ==
All tracks are written by the Jaz, except where noted.

No.	Title	Writer(s)	Producer(s)	Length
1.	"Put the Squeeze on 'Em"		The Jaz	3:52
2.	"It's That Simple" (featuring Jay-Z)	The Jaz; Jay-Z	Prince Paul	4:14
3.	"A Groove (This Is What U Rap 2)"		Chad Elliott; the Jaz	3:53
4.	"Abnormal"		Prince Paul	3:25
5.	"Ease Up Jaz"		Vandy C	3:56
6.	"I'll Smoke You"		Elliott; the Jaz	3:53
7.	"Doped Up"		The Jaz	4:53
8.	"To Your Soul"		Vandy C	4:08
9.	"Flag of the Mahdi"	The Jaz; Elliott	Elliott; the Jaz	2:22
10.	"A Nation Divided"		The Jaz	4:32
11.	"Why?"		Vandy C	4:28
12.	"Black Man in Charge"		Elliott; the Jaz	2:57
13.	"The Originators" (featuring Jay-Z)	The Jaz; Jay-Z	The Jaz	4:14
14.	"Not Shoutin' Out"		The Jaz	1:07
Total length:				51:54

== Personnel ==
- Jonathan Burks – main performer, producer (tracks: 1, 3, 6–7, 9–10, 12–14)
- Shawn Corey Carter – featured performer (tracks: 2, 13)
- Chad "Dr. Cuess" Elliott – producer (tracks: 3, 6, 9, 12)
- Vandy Colter – producer (tracks: 5, 8, 11), engineering
- Paul Edward Huston – producer (tracks: 2, 4)
- Dwayne Alexander – executive producer
- Gary Clugston – engineering
- Kieran Walsh – engineering
- Mike Rogers – engineering
- Herb Powers Jr. – mastering
- Henry Marquez – art direction
- Lu Ann Graffeo – design
- Jeffrey Scales – photography

== Charts ==
Singles

Year	Song	Peak positions
Year	Song	US Rap
1990	"The Originators"	13
1991	"A Groove (This Is What U Rap 2)"	18
