= Ladies First: A Story of Women in Hip-Hop =

2023 American documentary limited series

- Genre: Documentary
- Directed by: Hannah Beachler; dream hampton; Raeshem Nijhon; Giselle Bailey; Carri Twigg
- Narrated by: Rapsody
- Country of origin: United States
- Original language: English
- No. of episodes: 4

Production
- Executive producers: Carri Twigg; Raeshem Nijhon; dream hampton; Hannah Beachler; Troy Carter; MC Lyte; Nicole Galovski; Justin Simien; Jennifer Ryan
- Running time: 36-48 minutes
- Production companies: Lionsgate Television; Culture House Productions; Netflix

Original release
- Network: Netflix
- Release: August 9, 2023

Ladies First: A Story of Women in Hip-Hop is an American docuseries co-produced by Carri Twigg, Raeshem Nijhon, dream hampton, (Note: She stylizes her name in all lower case.) and Hannah Beachler. The four-part series is a comprehensive history of the role of women in hip-hop from the genre's inception to present day. Several writers, archivists, and prolific emcees (including Queen Latifah, Saweetie, and Kash Doll) provide commentary throughout the series. It was released on Netflix on August 9, 2023.

== Synopsis ==
"The series wrestles with a perennial question for Black women across all genres in music: How can women who are so influential in pop culture also be so mistreated and underappreciated?" Rapsody is the series narrator. Commentary is provided by writers such as Kierna Mayo, Brittney Cooper, and Joan Morgan, as well as various rappers including Queen Latifah, MC Lyte, Sha-Rock, Rah Digga, Roxanne Shanté, Monie Love, Yo-Yo, Remy Ma, Da Brat, Kash Doll, Latto, Coi Leray, Tierra Whack, Rapsody, Chika, and Saweetie.

== Episodes ==
No.	Title	Directed by	Original release date
1	"Shaping Hip-Hop"	Hannah Beachler & Naeshem Rijohn	August 9, 2023
The first episode centers the contributions of women to hip-hop since its inception, including interviews with pioneers Sha-Rock and MC Lyte.
2	"What Are They Up Against?"	Hannah Beachler	August 9, 2023
This episode shares the double standards female emcees have experienced and the barriers they face to build legitimacy in the music industry.
3	"What Have They Lost?"	dream hampton & Giselle Bailey	August 9, 2023
Episode three focuses on the erasure of Black women's contributions to hip-hop, exploitation in the music industry, as well as incidents of violence and abuse that have been ignored or dismissed.
4	"What's Changing?"	Giselle Bailey & Carri Twigg	August 9, 2023

== Production ==
Ladies First was developed by Carri Twigg and Raeshem Nijhon of the production company Culture House, who wanted to create a series about women in hip-hop. Hannah Beachler also served as co-director and co-executive producer alongside dream hampton. Additional producers include Troy Carter, MC Lyte, Nicole Galovski, Justin Simien, and Jennifer Ryan.

Although hampton initially declined to participate when approached by Twigg and Nijhon, she eventually agreed to produce because the duo "was willing to complicate" the narrative of how "revolutionary" the genre can be with its "broken gender politics." The documentary includes the triumphs of women trailblazers as well as the history of abuse and misogyny endured by women in the scene.

The series is named after the song "Ladies First" by Queen Latifah. The producers had difficulty finding a network to greenlight the series, until it was ultimately picked up by Jamila Farwell of Netflix.

== Release ==
The series was released on Netflix on August 9, 2023, coinciding with the 50th anniversary of hip-hop.

== Critical reception ==
Ladies First received positive reception. In a mainly positive review, Kyndall Cunningham wrote for The Daily Beast, "the series doesn’t tread new historical territory or extract fresh insights or experiences from its interviewees; rather, it seems more focused on creating a definitive record about where female rappers stand and how far they’ve come. For any young music fanatic trying to understand our current cultural moment, it’s a good start." Shelli Nicole wrote in a positive review for Vogue, "You don’t have to be familiar with the work of the women in Ladies First: A Story of Women in Hip-Hop in order to watch the docuseries and find yourself in it. It’s a love letter, a sharing of history, and even a business plan by a group of Black women for the Black women—of all generations—who are watching." El Hunt gave Ladies First 4/5 stars in the Evening Standard and wrote: "At times, Ladies First’s sequencing could be tightened up, and it would perhaps work better as a feature-length documentary rather than a mini-series...The fact that this is likely down to the breadth of insight offered by its fascinating line-up of contributors makes it an easy enough flaw to excuse. With so much male-dominated hip-hop history to set right, Ladies First has a big task on its hands, and largely pulls it off."

== Awards and nominations ==
- 2023 – Nominee, Critics' Choice Documentary Award for Best Music Documentary
- 2023 – Nominee, IDA Award for Best Multi-Part Documentary
- 2024 – Nominee, NAACP Image Award for Outstanding Documentary
