= H. P. Gets Busy =

Single by High Potent
- Released: 1986
- Recorded: 1986
- Studio: Rawlston Recording Studio (Brooklyn, New York)
- Genre: Hip hop
- Length: 5:54
- Label: Get Live Records
- Songwriter(s): Jonathan Burks; Shawn Carter; J. Ward; E. Ward
- Producer(s): The Jaz; Jack Walker

"H. P. Gets Busy" is a song by American hip hop group High Potent. It was released as a single in 1986. The song features the debut of Jay-Z.
