= Word to the Jaz =

Studio album by the Jaz
- Released: May 2, 1989
- Recorded: 1988–1989
- Studio: Abbey Road (London)
- Genre: Hip hop
- Length: 58:13
- Label: EMI USA
- Producers: Bryan "Chuck" New; Pete "Q" Harris; the Jaz

The Jaz chronology
Word to the Jaz (1989)	To Your Soul (1990)

Singles from Word to the Jaz
- 1. "Buss da Speaker / Let's Play House" Released: 1989; 2. "Hawaiian Sophie" Released: 1989; 3. "Word to the Jaz" Released: 1989

Professional ratings
Review scores
Source	Rating
RapReviews	6.5/10

Word to the Jaz is the debut studio album by American rapper and producer the Jaz, from New York City. It was released in 1989 via EMI USA, and produced by Bryan "Chuck" New, Pete Q. Harris, and the Jaz. The album peaked at number 87 on the Top R&B/Hip-Hop Albums chart. It featured guest appearances from Jay-Z on the song "Hawaiian Sophie", which peaked at number 18 on the Hot Rap Songs chart. The single "Let's Play House"/"Buss the Speaker" peaked at number 26 on the Billboard Dance Club Songs chart.

== Track listing ==
All tracks are written by the Jaz.

No.	Title	Length
1.	"Dance to This"	3:56
2.	"Pumpin"	4:33
3.	"Hawaiian Sophie"	4:26
4.	"Give a Lil Extra"	4:56
5.	"Fun"	5:43
6.	"Word to the Jaz"	5:23
7.	"Let's Play House"	4:53
8.	"Boost Up the Family"	4:32
9.	"Shana"	5:19
10.	"I Can Dig Rappin'"	4:28
11.	"Look Out"	5:26
12.	"Buss da Speaka"	4:38
Total length:		58:13

== Personnel ==
- Jonathan Burks – main performer, producer
- Shawn Corey Carter – featured performer (track 3)
- Bryan Chuck New – producer
- Peter Brian Harris – producer
- Scott Folks – executive producer
- Carol Chen – art direction
- Henry Marquez – art direction
- Timothy White – photography

== Charts ==
Album

Chart (1989)	Peak position
US Top R&B/Hip-Hop Albums (Billboard)	87

Singles

Year	Song	Peak positions	
Year	Song	US Billboard Hot Rap Songs	US Billboard Dance Club Songs
1989	"Let's Play House" / "Buss the Speaker"	—	26
1989	"Hawaiian Sophie"	18	—
1989	"Word to the Jaz"	—	—
