= 40/40 Club (venue) =

American chain of luxury sports bars

Coordinates: 40°44′35″N 73°59′22″W

- Type: Sports bar
- Area served: New York City
- Owner: Jay-Z
- Website: the4040club.com

The 40/40 Club is an American chain of sports bars and lounges owned by Jay-Z. The name is borrowed from the baseball term for the exclusive group of Major League Baseball players who have achieved the rare individual feat of 40 home runs and 40 stolen bases in a single season.

== Overview ==
The first 40/40 Club opened in New York City in 2003; this was followed by locations in Atlantic City in 2005, in Las Vegas in 2007, at the Barclays Center in Brooklyn in 2012, and at Hartsfield–Jackson Atlanta International Airport in 2014. The Atlantic City and Las Vegas locations have since closed. In addition to this, the flagship location in New York City was closed in August 2023.

The venues are known for their live music, celebrity patrons, and sports memorabilia. The brand gained recognition when Jay-Z referenced his investment in his 2003 song "Dirt off Your Shoulder" with the line "Now you chillin' with a boss, bitch of course SC on the sleeve / at the 40/40 club ESPN on the screen".

The decor of The 40/40 Club is a mix of memorabilia from the USA's greatest games. The "Hall of Fame" connects the main floor with the upstairs VIP rooms and houses autographed jerseys donated by various sports celebrities. The jerseys hang museum style, as well as decorate points of the lounges along with other sports memorabilia, such as the autographed gloves from the 1974 "Fight of the Century": Ali vs. Frazier and the WWE championship belt of Kurt Angle.
