= Dream hampton =

American filmmaker and producer

dream hampton
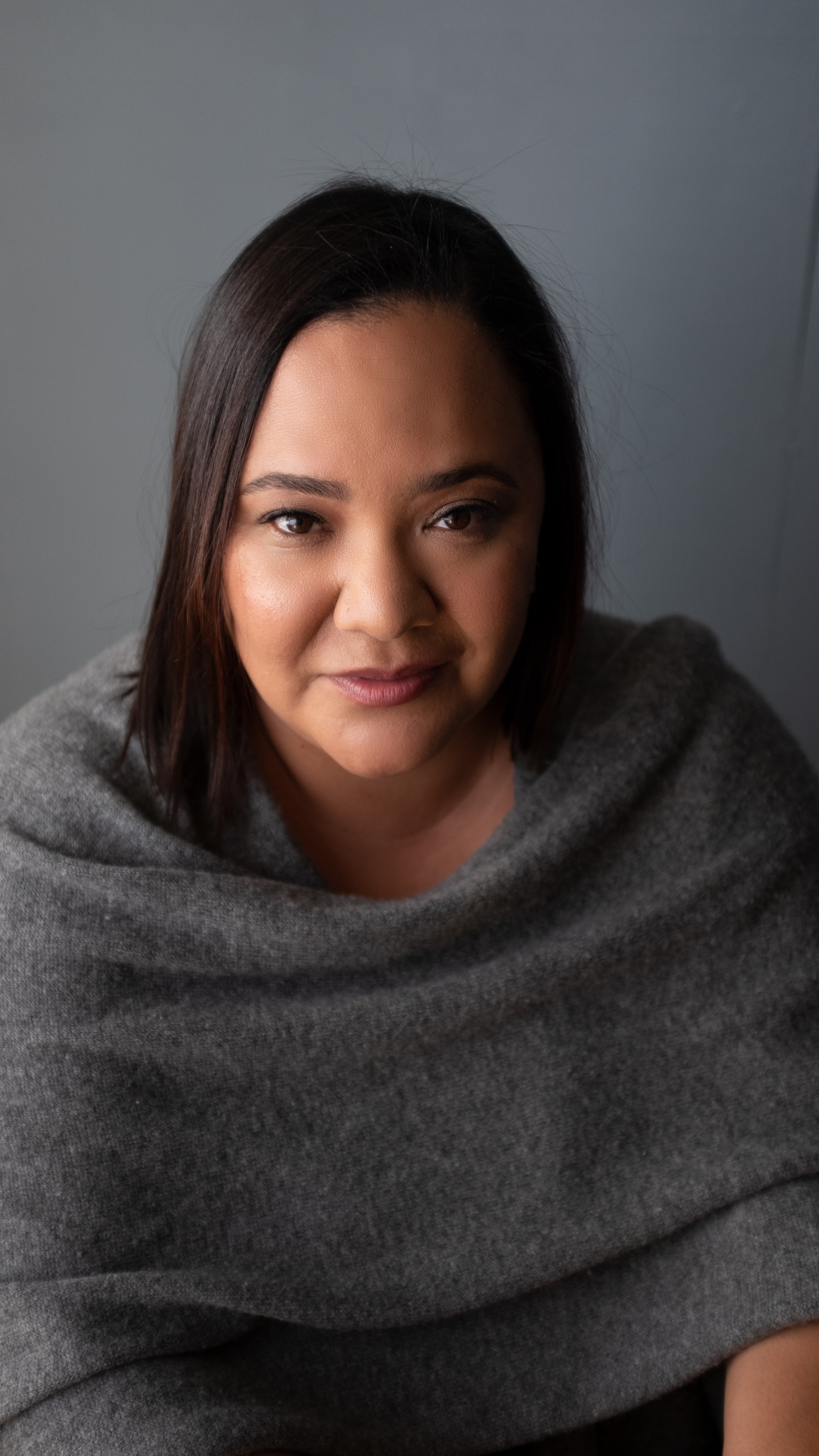
- Born: 1972 (age 53–54)
- Education: New York University
- Occupations: Filmmaker; Writer; Producer
- Known for: Surviving R. Kelly (2019 documentary series)
- Website: www.dreamhampton.com

dream hampton (stylized in lowercase) is an American filmmaker, producer, and writer. Her work includes the 2019 Lifetime documentary series Surviving R. Kelly, which she executive produced, and the 2012 An Oversimplification of Her Beauty, on which she served as co-executive producer. She co-wrote Jay-Z's 2010 memoir Decoded.

== Early life and education ==
Hampton was born to an African American family in Detroit in 1972, and has said she was named after Rev. Martin Luther King's "I Have a Dream" speech. She stylizes her name in all-lowercase as a nod to author bell hooks. She studied filmmaking at New York University Tisch School of the Arts.

== Career ==
Hampton has written for Vibe, Essence, Harper's Bazaar, The Village Voice, Detroit News, and Spin. She co-wrote Jay-Z's 2010 memoir Decoded.

As a member of the Malcolm X Grassroots Movement, an African-American activist group inspired by Malcolm X's "Message to the Grass Roots" speech, hampton co-organized Black August, a benefit concert for political prisoners. Her concert film about the event, Black August: A Hip-Hop Documentary Concert, premiered at the Lincoln Center for the Performing Arts in 2010. In 2013, hampton directed Treasure, a documentary about the 2011 killing of Shelley Hilliard, a 19-year-old transgender woman, in Detroit. She made the short documentary We Demand Justice for Renisha Mcbride after organizing a protest over Mcbride's death.

Hampton was executive producer of Surviving R. Kelly, a 2019 documentary series about the decades of sexual-abuse allegations against R. Kelly. Page six reported that a Homeland Security agent had watched the series and started a federal investigation into the victims' allegations. After its release, Kelly was charged with aggravated criminal sexual abuse and other crimes for an eventual total of 18 federal charges.

She has been a Visiting Artist with Stanford University's Institute for Diversity in the Arts and a Kresge Artist Fellow.

As of 2020, hampton served on the board of the advocacy group Color of Change.

== Recognition ==
Hampton's short film I Am Ali was selected for the 2002 Sundance Film Festival and won "Best Short Film" at the Newport Film Festival.

In 2015 she received a Richard Nichols Luminary award and Treasure: From Tragedy to Trans Justice Mapping a Detroit Story won Best Documentary at the BlackStar Film Festival.

In 2019 hampton received a Ms. Foundation Gloria Award and was named on the Time 100. She and Brie Miranda Bryant and Tamra Simmons, who worked with her on Surviving R. Kelly, were named to Variety's 2019 Power Women New York list.

Surviving R. Kelly received a Peabody Award. It received an MTV Movie Award for Best Documentary. It received a Rockies Award for "Program of the Year" at the Banff World Media Festival.

In 2023 she received a Rockefeller Foundation’s Bellagio Center Residency.

In 2024 she was selected by The New Museum as the Stuart Regen Visionary, for "individuals who have made major contributions to art and culture and who are actively imagining a better future".

== Filmography ==
- Behind The Music: The Notorious B.I.G. (1997), associate producer
- I Am Ali (2002), director
- Notorious B.I.G.: Bigger Than Life (2007), executive producer
- Black August: A Hip-Hop Documentary Concert (2010), director
- QueenS (2012 music video) by recording artists THEESatisfaction
- An Oversimplification of Her Beauty (2012), co-executive producer
- The Russian Winter (2012), associate producer
- Treasure: From Tragedy to Trans Justice Mapping a Detroit Story (2015), executive producer
- We Demand Justice for Renisha Mcbride
- The War on Drugs is an Epic Fail (New York Times 2016)
- It's A Hard Truth Ain't It (HBO 2019), executive producer
- Finding Justice (BET 2019), executive producer
- Burial of Kojo (Netflix 2019), co-executive producer
- Surviving R. Kelly (2019), executive producer
- We Hold These Truths (2022), director
- Freshwater (2022), director
- Ladies First: A Story of Women in Hip-Hop (2023), director, executive producer
- It Was All A Dream (2024), director

== See also ==
- Black women filmmakers
