= Marcy Houses =

Public housing development in Brooklyn, New York

- NYCHA property
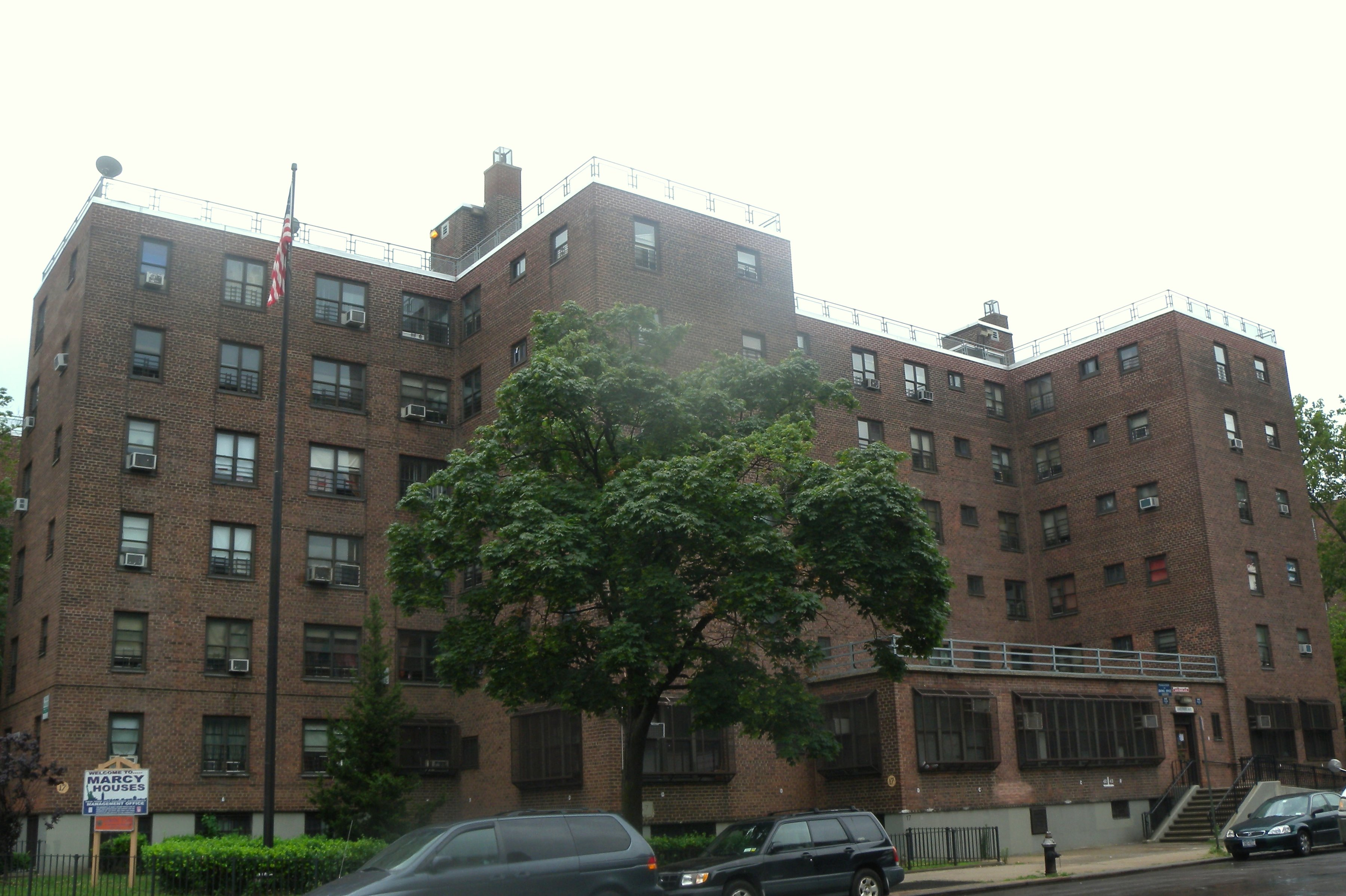
- Nickname: Marcy
- Interactive map of Marcy Houses
- Coordinates: 40.697°N 73.951°W
- Country: United States
- State: New York
- City: New York City
- Borough: Brooklyn
- Construction finished: 1949
- ZIP codes: 11206
- Area codes: 718, 347, 929, and 917

The Marcy Houses, or The Marcy Projects, is a public housing complex built and operated by the New York City Housing Authority (NYCHA) and located in Bedford–Stuyvesant and is bordered by Flushing, Marcy, Nostrand and Myrtle avenues. The complex was named after William L. Marcy (1786–1857), a lawyer, soldier, and statesman. Consisting of 27 six-story buildings on 28.49 acres (0.1153 km^{2}; 0.04452 sq mi), it contains 1,705 apartments housing about 4,286 residents (average of 2.5 people to an apartment).

== Development ==
The land Marcy is on was bought in 1945 by the City of New York; it had been the site of an old Dutch windmill. Homes and businesses (including two banks) were cleared for the construction of Marcy, as well as sections of Hopkins, Ellery, Floyd (now Martin Luther King Jr. Place), and Stockton streets that went through where the complex now sits. Marcy was completed on January 19, 1949. In 1946, 3.2 acres (0.013 km^{2}; 0.0050 sq mi) of the 28.49 acres (0.1153 km^{2}; 0.04452 sq mi) were set aside for a playground; this playground was reconstructed in 1989.

Marcy has taken steps to become more environmentally friendly; in 2006, it replaced all conventional water heaters with energy-saving, instantaneous water heaters. In October 2008, Marcy's neighborhood garden earned 3rd place at the 43rd Annual Garden and Greening Awards Ceremony, and its evergreen garden earned second place. On January 19, 2009, the 60th anniversary of the building's completion, Mayor Michael Bloomberg proclaimed the day Marcy Houses Day.

== Notable people ==
- Jay-Z (born 1969), musician
- Jaz-O (born 1964), musician
- Memphis Bleek (born 1978), musician
- Sauce Money (born 1969), musician

== See also ==
- New York City Housing Authority
- List of New York City Housing Authority properties
