= Jaz-O =

American rapper and record producer (born 1964)

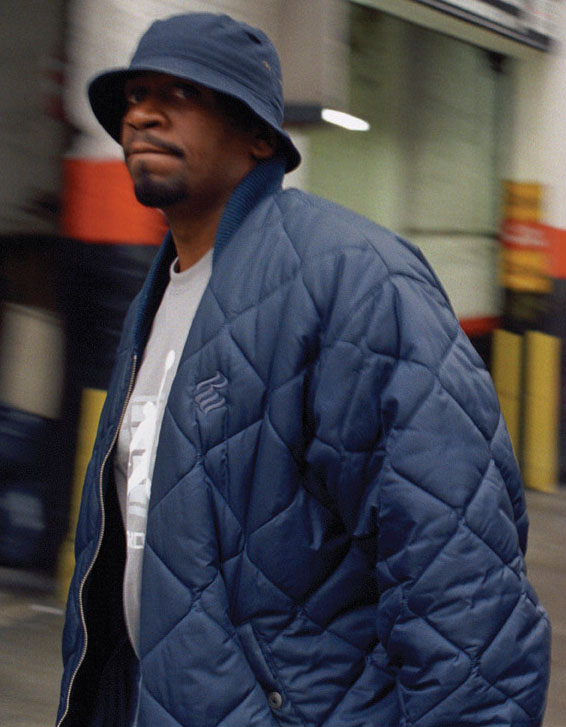
- Jaz-O in 2000

Background information
- Also known as: The Jaz; Big Jaz
- Born: Jonathan Allen Burks; October 4, 1964 (age 62); Brooklyn, New York City, U.S.
- Genre: East Coast hip-hop
- Occupations: Rapper; songwriter; record producer
- Years active: 1986–present
- Labels: Equity; Kingz Kounty Media; Roc Nation; EMI USA; Rancore
- Formerly of: High Potent; The Immobilarie

Jonathan Allen Burks Sr. (born October 4, 1964), better known by his stage name Jaz-O (formerly The Jaz and Big Jaz), is an American rapper and record producer. Active in the late 1980s through the 1990s, he became known in retrospect as the mentor of fellow Brooklyn rapper Jay-Z. Burks, nicknamed "the Originator", debuted the artist on his 1986 single "H. P. Gets Busy". Burks signed with EMI to release two studio albums: Word to the Jaz (1989) and To Your Soul (1990). His second extended play (EP), The Warmup (2021), was the first release from Equity Distribution, a subsidiary of Jay-Z's Roc Nation. He has also been credited with production work for other acts including Puff Daddy, Rakim, Usual Suspects, GZA, Kool G Rap, Queen Latifah, M.O.P., and Group Home, among others.

== Early life ==
Jonathan Burks was born in the Brooklyn borough of New York City and raised in Marcy Houses, a housing project in the Bedford-Stuyvesant neighborhood. Originally attending college to become an accountant, he followed a friend's advice to become a rapper after hearing Grandmaster Caz, and being inspired by UTFO's "Roxanne, Roxanne".

== Career ==
=== Early years and signing with EMI USA ===
Raised in the same projects as Jay-Z, the two would meet and become friends, with Jaz-O being a rhyme mentor to Jay-Z. Sometime during the year of 1986, the two lyricists would soon form a rap group by the name of High Potent. Despite the group being short-lived, the two recorded and released several songs throughout 1986, before Jaz-O would go on to get a record deal with EMI USA. In regards to the signing, he stated:

I had been rhyming since I was 14. Do the math on your own! I became a legend on the east coast – which in the 'eighties' was quite remarkable, in about six years. I was always told I was the best most had ever heard. I put out a song in 1985 called "HP Gets Busy" on our own label (my manager at the time, Jack Walker and I), featuring two of my comrades from Long Island, NY, and my young apprentice, Jay Z. We did shows regionally; NY and Pittsburgh mostly. Meanwhile, I was recording with friend and producer, Fresh Gordon. He helped me get a single deal on Tommy Boy Records after I collaborated on a song with him called "My Fila" (a response to Run DMC's, "My Adidas"). A mutual friend of Gordon and I, Marlon Prescott, introduced me to my soon-to-be manager at that time, Stan Poses. In four months Stan solidified a major artist deal for me, and I became the first rap artist ever to sign with EMI Records. I also became the recipient of the largest advance and recording budget of any rap artist at that time.

=== 1989: Word to the Jaz ===
Several months after signing with EMI USA, Jaz-O visited London, where he would record his debut album. Joining him on the trip was Jay-Z, as well as future Murder Inc Records CEO and producer Irv Gotti, who was Jaz-O's DJ at the time. After completion, Jaz-O released his debut album Word to the Jaz. The album was produced by Bryan "Chuck" New, Pete Q. Harris, and Jaz-O himself. The album peaked at number 87 on the Top R&B/Hip-Hop Albums chart. It featured a guest appearance from Jay-Z on the song "Hawaiian Sophie", which peaked at number 18 on the Hot Rap Songs chart. The single "Let's Play House"/"Buss the Speaker" peaked at number 26 on the Billboard Dance Club Songs chart. During this time, Jaz-O also made a guest appearance on The O'Jays's "Have You Had Your Love Today", which was a single released from their 1989 album Serious.

=== 1990: To Your Soul ===
Jaz-O released his second album To Your Soul on July 16, 1990. Despite the album not reaching the Billboard charts, its two singles, "The Originators" and "A Groove (This Is What U Rap 2)", peaked at No. 13 and No. 18, respectively, on the Hot Rap Songs chart. Similar to his debut album, Jay-Z was the only guest, being featured on two songs.

=== 1991–1996: Production work behind the scenes ===
Sometime after releasing his debut EP Ya Don't Stop in 1991, Jaz-O was dropped from EMI and began to spend time working behind the scenes as a producer. At some point, Jaz-O connected with The Lox, and produced I Got The Power for the group's demo tape, which was instrumental to the start of their successful career: Fellow Yonkers native Mary J. Blige, would receive the tape from a cousin who did music with the trio. Becoming a supporter of the group, Blige would pass the demo tape on to Bad Boy CEO Sean "Puffy" Combs while on a tour with Jodeci. Liking what he heard, Puff shortly signed The Lox to a deal and added I Got The Power to his debut No Way Out.

=== 1996–1998: Involvement with Jay-Z's early success ===
Throughout the late 1990s, Jaz-O had quite a hand in Jay-Z's early solo success. Jaz-O produced, and was featured on "Ain't No Nigga," the second single from Jay-Z's 1996 debut album, Reasonable Doubt. The song is cited as playing a significant role in securing Jay-Z's record deal with Def Jam.

Jaz-O then produced "Rap Game / Crack Game," a track that appeared on Jay's second album In My Lifetime, Vol. 1, released in 1997.

Jaz-O also produced two tracks for Jay-Z's Streets Is Watching. The album fared well commercially reaching #3 on the Top R&B/Hip-Hop Albums chart, and was released on May 12, 1998, by Roc-A-Fella Records and Def Jam Recordings.

In 1999, Jaz-O appeared on Jay-Z's "Nigga What, Nigga Who (Originator 99)", a single that was released from Jay-Z's third album Vol. 2... Hard Knock Life. The song became a big hit in Jaz-O's career at the time. However, this would be one of the last times the two would work together on music, for their friendship soured shortly afterwards.

=== 1999–2016: Feud with Jay-Z and forming Kingz Kounty ===
The long-standing feud between him and Jay-Z started when Jay-Z started Roc-A-Fella Records and tried to convince Jaz-O and fellow rapper Sauce Money to sign with the label. They both refused. It is rumored that they did not trust Roc-A-Fella Records CEO Damon Dash and label co-founder Kareem "Biggs" Burke. In addition, they were not satisfied with what they were to receive had they signed the contract ($300,000 in Jaz-O's case). Jay-Z confirmed this event on the song "What We Talkin' About" from the Blueprint 3 album where he raps "Dame made millions, even Jaz made some scraps, he could've made more but he ain't sign his contract".

Instead of signing with Roc-A-Fella Records, Jaz-O signed a deal with Rancore Records, and formed the hip-hop group Immobilarie. With the group, he released a collaboration album titled Jaz-O & The Immobilarie Family Present: Kingz Kounty.

Jay-Z went on to diss Jaz first on a track titled "Fuck Jaz-O AKA Jaz Ho", released by DJ Kayslay and featuring Freeway, Geda K, Young Chris, and Memphis Bleek. On the song, in which they rapped over Styles P's "Good Times" instrumental, and later on his album The Blueprint 2: The Gift & The Curse, Jay-Z states: "I'ma let karma catch up to Jaz-O." Jaz then responded with a record titled "Ova" on a DJ Kayslay mixtape, and after the response from Jay-Z and the members of Roc-A-Fella, he released the diss record response known as "Ova Part 2" in which he raps over N.O.R.E.'s "Nothin'" instrumental.

During the long-standing feud between mentor and protégé, Jay-Z would still give Jaz-O credit for his success (while dissing him at the same time) as heard in the song "I Do It For Hip Hop" on Ludacris's Theater of the Mind album, where Jay-Z says "Shout out to Grand Master Flash and to Caz and even Jaz's bum ass".

Soon after the "I Do It For Hip Hop" diss from Jay-Z, Jaz-O responded with his own diss record titled "Go Harder" which starts with Jaz-O rapping over his protege's "Brooklyn Go Hard" beat before the beat changes.

In late August 2009, Jaz-O was featured on another song dissing Jay-Z, titled "Gangstas Ride" with West Coast rapper, The Game. The song was fueled by beef between Game and Jay-Z at the time.

=== 2017–2020: Reunion with Jay-Z and signing with Roc Nation ===
In December 2017, Jaz-O and Jay-Z reunited at Jay-Z's 4:44 concert, seemingly ending their feud. In 2019, it was reported that the two had worked out a music deal for Jaz-O's Kingz Kounty Media Group to be distributed through Roc Nation's Equity Distribution.

On February 7, 2020, Jaz-O released an extended play (EP) titled The Warmup, on Kingz Kounty Media Group. It was distributed by Roc Nation's Equity Distribution.

=== 2021–present: Other ventures and releases ===
Jaz-O has since moved his 'Kingz Kounty Music Group" to Rival Distribution. He released "Lookin' Like", a collaboration single with Nipsey Hussle, on July 2, 2021. The song's music video was directed by Da Inphamus Amadeuz.

== Musical style ==
=== Influences ===
Jaz-O cites Grandmaster Caz as an early influence. Caz was the artist who made Jaz-O decide to become a rapper.

=== Rhyming and flow style ===
Jaz-O was the rapper to pioneer the triplet flow, which allows the rapper to flow far beyond sixteen syllables within the 4/4 time signature, being able to add extra syllables to the sixteen multiplies the syllables into twenty-fourths, which makes a triplet of an eighth. Since the 1990s, the triplet rhyme technique has become a common distinction among some of the most respected hip-hop lyricists. Several rappers who are well known for the technique include his former apprentice Jay-Z, Twista, and Bone Thugs-N-Harmony, as well as Fu-Schnickens, Spice-1, and Tech N9ne.

== Personal life ==
Jaz-O was known to be a visible figure in the Nuwaubian Nation during the 1980s. Nuwaubian beliefs and symbolism were prominent in the earlier years of his music career, and Nuwaubian fashion influenced his wardrobe.

== Discography ==
=== Studio albums ===
- Word to the Jaz (1989)
- To Your Soul (1990)
- Kingz Kounty (2002) (with the Immobilarie)

=== Extended plays ===
- Ya Don't Stop (1991)
- The Warmup (2020)

=== Singles ===
List of singles, with selected chart positions, showing year released and album name
Year	Title	Artist(s)	Album	Peak position
1986	"H. P. Gets Busy"	High Potent (with Jay-Z)		
1987	"I'm In Love"			
1989	"Buss The Speaker" / "Let's Play House"		Word to the Jaz	No. 26 on Dance Club Songs
1989	"Hawaiian Sophie"	Jay-Z	Word to the Jaz	No. 18 on Hot Rap Songs
1989	"Word To The Jaz"		Word to the Jaz	
1990	"The Originators"	Jay-Z	To Your Soul	No. 13 on Hot Rap Songs
1991	"A Groove (This Is What U Rap 2)"		To Your Soul	No. 18 on Hot Rap Songs
1991	"Hypocritters"		Ya Don't Stop	
1996	"Waitin'" / "Foundation"	Jay-Z, Sauce Money, Tone Hooker		
1999	"Jigga What..."	Jay-Z, Amil	Vol. 2... Hard Knock Life	No. 84 on the Hot 100
2000	"Kingz Kounty"		Kingz Kounty	
2001	"Let's Go"	Jay-Z	Kingz Kounty	
2002	"Love Is Gone"		Kingz Kounty	No. 20 on Hot Rap Songs
2002	"Ova" / "Deadly"			
2005	"Be There"			
2021	"Lookin' Like" Remastered	Jaz-O / Nipsey Hussle	The Warm-Up	

== Production credits ==
Besides being an emcee, he has produced songs for several hip hop artists other than Jay-Z, including Group Home, M.O.P, Ras Kass, Rakim, Kool G Rap, and others.

=== Solo ===
Year	Artist	Song	Album
1995	Group Home	"4 Give My Sins"	Livin' Proof
1995	Jay-Z	"In My Lifetime" (Remix)	In My Lifetime 12"
1996	Jay-Z, Foxy Brown	"Ain't No Nigga"	Reasonable Doubt / The Nutty Professor
1996	Stephanie Cooke	"Live W/ Yo Self"	Tricky Presents Grassroots
1996	Da Rahnjaz	"Daily Basis"	
1996	M.O.P.	"Born 2 Kill"	Firing Squad
1996	M.O.P.	"World Famous"	Firing Squad
1996	M.O.P.	"Lifestyles of a Ghetto Child"	Firing Squad
1996	M.O.P.	"Born 2 Kill" (Jazz Mix)	Firing Squad
1997	Teflon	"Gotta Get Ova"	My Will
1997	Memphis Bleek	"4 BKLYN/Hard Days"	
1997	P Diddy, The Lox	"I Got the Power"	No Way Out
1997	Jay-Z	"Rap Game / Crack Game"	In My Lifetime, Vol. 1
1998	Usual Suspects	"Crazy"	Streets Is Watching
1998	Ras Kass	"H2O Proof"	Rasassination
1998	Queen Latifah	"Court Is in Session"	Order in the Court
1999	Rakim	"It's a Must"	The Master
1999	Memphis Bleek	"Live Life 2 tha Fullest"	Thicker than Water
2000	KT	"Bang Out"	
2000	Sauce Money	"Chart Climbin"	Middle Finger U / 3 Strikes
2002	Kool G Rap	"Black Widow"	The Giacana Story
2002	GZA	"Legend of the Liquid Sword"	Legend of the Liquid Sword
