= Live at Woodstock (DMX album) =

Live album by DMX
- Released: September 1999
- Recorded: July 23, 1999
- Genre: Hardcore hip hop
- Label: Ruff Ryders
- Producer: Swizz Beatz; Dame Grease; Irv Gotti; PK; DJ Shok

DMX chronology
Flesh of My Flesh, Blood of My Blood (1998)	Live at Woodstock (1999)	...And Then There Was X (1999)

Singles from Live at Woodstock
- 1. "Stop Being Greedy" Released: September 1999; 2. "Get At Me Dog" Released: October 1999; 3. "Slippin'" Released: November 1999

Professional ratings
Review scores
Source	Rating
AllMusic	4/5 stars
The Daily Vault	B
Entertainment Weekly	B+
Robert Christgau	(dud)
Rolling Stone	3/5 stars
The Source	(favorable)
USA Today	3/4 stars

Live at Woodstock is an album of American rapper DMX, consisting of recordings of his live performance at the infamous Woodstock '99 festival. It was released in 1999. It consists primarily of songs from It's Dark and Hell Is Hot, and Flesh of My Flesh, Blood of My Blood.

== Track listing ==
1. "Intro" – 1:13
2. "I'm Gonna Start This" – 1:54
3. "My Niggas" – 1:55
4. "It's A War" – 2:03
5. "Fuckin' With D" – 2:03
6. "Stop Being Greedy" – 2:26
7. "It's All Good" – 2:58
8. "No Love For Me" – 1:23
9. "Damien" – 2:34
10. "Tell Me How U Feelin'" 1:35
11. "Keep Your Shit The Hardest" – 2:58
12. "How It's Goin' Down" – 3:22
13. "Get At Me Dog" – 2:38
14. "Ruff Ryders Anthem" – 3:50
15. "Slippin'" – 4:14
16. "Prayer" – 3:22
17. "Ready To Meet Him" – 1:47
- "I'm Gonna Start This" is "Intro" to "It's Dark and Hell Is Hot".
- "It's A War" is the song "It's On" from the album DJ Clue Fri. "The Professional".
- "Tell Me How U Feelin '" to "Some X Shit" from the album Ruff Ryders Fri. "Ryde or Die Vol. 1".
- "Ruff Ryders Anthem" includes a chorus and a verse from the remix of the song included on the mixtape DJ Clue.
