= BRWNGRLZ =

American jewelry company

- Type: Private
- Industry: Jewellery
- Founded: 2013
- Founder: Gretchen Carvajal
- Products: Laser-cut jewelry (including earrings)
- Website: www.brwngrlz.com

BRWNGRLZ is a laser-cut jewelry company started by Gretchen Carvajal for Black and brown women. In 2021, BRWNGRLZ was featured in Vogue.

== Overview ==
=== Origin ===
Carvajal moved to the United States in 2001. She grew up in the Bay Area. In 2011, Carvajal won a spot to compete at the national youth poetry slam, Brave New Voices (BNV), in San Francisco. At BNV, she met an artist selling handmade earrings, which later inspired her to start her own earring business. In 2013, Carvajal was frustrated and inspired by the lack of representation of women of color in fashion accessories. She started the business, BRWNGRLZ, out of her dormitory, creating laser cut jewelry for women of color.

=== Inspirations ===
Carvajal is inspired by prominent cultures in the Bay Area, such as Black, Chicana, and South East Asian cultures. Her creations mix technical fine art skills with symbols of social movements and cultural moments, such as the United Farm Workers movement and the international hotel strike. Each pair of earrings in the company's collection is named after a woman of color.

=== Collaborations ===
The company has collaborated with Toro y Moi, Ruby Ibarra, Bayani Art, and Kehlani.

== See also ==
- Abdullah Sakkijha Jewelry
- Folli Follie
