= Slippin' =

1998 single by DMX

Single by DMX

from the album Flesh of My Flesh, Blood of My Blood
- B-side: Ruff Ryders' Anthem; How's It Goin' Down
- Released: November 27, 1998
- Recorded: 1998
- Genre: Conscious hip-hop; R&B
- Length: 5:05
- Label: Ruff Ryders; Def Jam
- Songwriter(s): E. Simmons
- Producer(s): DJ SHOK

DMX singles chronology
"Grand Finale" (1998)	"Slippin'" (1998)	"Money, Cash, Hoes" (1998)

Music video
- Slippin' on YouTube

"Slippin'" is a song by American rapper DMX, released as the first single from his second studio album Flesh of My Flesh, Blood of My Blood (1998). The song peaked at #30 on the UK Singles Chart, and at #60 on the U.S. Billboard Hot R&B/Hip-Hop Songs. The song samples "Moonstreams" by Grover Washington Jr. from the 1975 album Feel So Good.

This song includes background vocals from future American Idol contestant Tamyra Gray.

== Music video ==
The song's music video portrays DMX's youth. In 2018, DMX's attorneys showed the video to Judge Jed S. Rakoff in an effort to persuade Rakoff to be lenient when sentencing DMX for tax evasion; Rakoff responded by sentencing DMX to only one year in prison, instead of the five years requested by prosecutors.

== Chart performance ==
Chart (1999)	Peak position
U.S. Billboard Hot R&B/Hip-Hop Songs	60
UK Singles Chart	30

== Certifications ==
Region	Certification	Certified units/sales
United States (RIAA)	Platinum	1,000,000^{‡}
^{‡} Sales+streaming figures based on certification alone.
