= ... And Then There Was X =

...And Then There Was X

Studio album by DMX
- Released: December 21, 1999
- Studios: Hit Factory Criteria (Miami); Powerhouse (New York)
- Genre: Hip hop
- Length: 60:15
- Labels: Island Def Jam; Def Jam 2000; Ruff Ryders
- Producers: Dee & Waah Dean (exec.); Swizz Beatz; PK; Dame Grease; Irv Gotti; Nokio; DJ Shok

DMX chronology
Live at Woodstock (1999)	...And Then There Was X (1999)	The Great Depression (2001)

Singles from ...And Then There Was X
- 1. "What's My Name" Released: December 28, 1999; 2. "Party Up (Up in Here)" Released: February 11, 2000; 3. "What These Bitches Want" Released: June 6, 2000

Professional ratings
Review scores
Source	Rating
AllMusic	4/5 stars
The Daily Vault	B+
Entertainment Weekly	A−
Q	4/5 stars
RapReviews	7/10
Rolling Stone	3/5 stars
The Source	3.5/5 stars

...And Then There Was X is the third studio album by American rapper DMX. The album was released on December 21, 1999, by The Island Def Jam Music Group, Def Jam Recordings, and Ruff Ryders Entertainment. The album was nominated for Best Rap Album at the 2001 Grammys.

== Singles ==
The album's first single "What's My Name" was released on December 28, 1999. It reached #67 on the Billboard Hot 100 chart. The second single "Party Up (Up in Here)" was released on February 20, 2000, and became his most successful single of his career peaking at number 27 on the Hot 100. The third single "What These Bitches Want" featuring Sisqó was released on June 6, 2000, which peaked at number 49.

== Commercial performance ==
... And Then There Was X debuted at number one the US Billboard 200 chart, selling 698,000 copies in its first week, according to Nielsen Soundscan. This became DMX's third US number one debut. In its second week, the album dropped to number two on the chart, selling an additional 399,000 copies. On February 7, 2001, the album was certified five times platinum by the Recording Industry Association of America (RIAA) for shipments of over five million copies in the US. As of October 2009, the album has sold over 5 million copies in the United States. To date, it is DMX's best selling album.

In late 2000, DMX toured as part of the Anger Management Tour with headliners Limp Bizkit and supporting acts Godsmack and Sinnistar. He performed after Sinnistar and was on tour from November 24 to December 19, 2000. He was the only hip-hop act on the second leg of the tour.

== Track listing ==
Credits adapted from the album's liner notes.

No.	Title	Writer(s)	Producer(s)	Length
1.	"The Kennel" (Intro)			0:36
2.	"One More Road to Cross"	Earl Simmons; Kasseem Dean	Swizz Beatz	4:20
3.	"The Professional"	Simmons; Anthony Fields	P. Killer Trackz	3:35
4.	"Fame"	Simmons; Damon Blackman	Dame Grease	3:37
5.	"A Lot to Learn" (Skit)			0:39
6.	"Here We Go Again"	Simmons; Michael Gomez	DJ Shok	3:52
7.	"Party Up (Up in Here)"	Simmons; Dean	Swizz Beatz	4:28
8.	"Make a Move"	Simmons; Fields	P. Killer Trackz	3:33
9.	"What These Bitches Want" (featuring Sisqó)	Simmons; Tamir Ruffin	Nokio	4:13
10.	"What's My Name?"	Simmons; Irving Lorenzo; Edward Hinson	Self Service; Irv Gotti	3:52
11.	"More 2 a Song"	Simmons; Fields	P. Killer Trackz	3:42
12.	"Don't You Ever"	Simmons; Dean	Swizz Beatz	3:48
13.	"The Shakedown" (Skit)			0:35
14.	"D-X-L (Hard White)" (featuring The LOX and Drag-On)	Simmons; Blackman; Jason Phillips; David Styles; Sean Jacobs; Melvin Smalls	Dame Grease	4:21
15.	"Comin' for Ya"	Simmons; Dean	Swizz Beatz	4:02
16.	"Prayer III"	Simmons		2:00
17.	"Angel" (featuring Regina Belle)	Simmons; Lorenzo	Irv Gotti	5:07
18.	"Good Girls, Bad Guys" (featuring Dyme) (Bonus track)	Simmons; Fields; Charly Charles; Randy Muller	P. Killer Trackz; Charly "Shuga Bear" Charles	3:55

== Personnel ==
- A&R [A&R Assistance For Def Jam] – Angelique Phillips
- A&R [A&R Assistance For Ruff Ryders] – Jamal Frierson, Mike L., Victor L. Cobb
- A&R [A&R Coordinator For Def Jam] – Gail Hansen
- A&R [A&R Coordinator For Ruff Ryders] – Nas Collins
- A&R [A&R Direction For Def Jam] – Folayan Knight, Randy Acker
- A&R [A&R Direction For Ruff Ryders] – Dee Dean
- A&R [A&R Direction For Ruff Ryders], Marketing [Marketing For Ruff Ryders] – Jay "Icepick" Jackson
- Art Direction, Design – Akisia Grigsby, Cey Adams, Charles Duffy, Darius Wilmore, Ruff Ryders
- Art & Graphics – The Drawing Board
- Executive-Producer – Dee, Waah Dean
- Executive-Producer [Executive In Charge Of Production] – Chivon Dean, Ray Copeland
- Legal [Legal Counsel For DMX] – Matthew Middleton
- Legal [Legal Counsel For Ruff Ryders] – L. Londell McMillian
- Legal [Legal Counsel] – Ron Sweeney
- Management – B.A.R. Management, Inc., Ray D. Copeland (Uncle Ray)
- Management [Business Affairs For Def Jam] – Susan Sneider
- Management [Business Affairs For Ruff Ryders] – Rudy Smith
- Marketing [Marketing For Def Jam] – Jazz Young
- Marketing [Marketing For Ruff Ryders] – Keisha Gibbs
- Mastered By – Tony Dawsey
- Mixed By – Ken DURO Ifill (tracks: 10, 15, 17), Rich Keller (tracks: 2 to 4, 6 to 9, 11, 12, 14, 18)
- Photography By – Nitin Vadukul
- Producer – P. Killer Trackz (tracks: 3, 8, 11, 18), Swizz Beatz (tracks: 2, 7, 12, 15)
- Recorded By – Chris Theis (tracks: 2 to 4, 6, 7, 9, 11, 12, 14, 15, 17, 18)
- Written-By – A. Fields (tracks: 3, 8, 11, 18), D. Blackman (tracks: 4, 14), E. Simmons, I. Lorenzo (tracks: 10, 17), K. Dean (tracks: 2, 7, 12, 15)

== Charts ==
=== Weekly charts ===
Chart (2000)	Peak position
Australian Dance Albums (ARIA)	25
Canadian Albums (Billboard)	6
Canadian R&B Albums (Nielsen SoundScan)	5
Dutch Albums (Album Top 100)	64
German Albums (Offizielle Top 100)	46
UK Albums (Official Charts)	108
UK R&B Albums (Official Charts)	22
US Billboard 200	1
US Top R&B/Hip-Hop Albums (Billboard)	1

=== Year-end charts ===
Chart (2000)	Position
Canadian Albums (Nielsen SoundScan)	75
US Billboard 200	10
US Top R&B/Hip-Hop Albums (Billboard)	3

Chart (2002)	Position
Canadian R&B Albums (Nielsen SoundScan)	188
Canadian Rap Albums (Nielsen SoundScan)	93

== Certifications ==
Region	Certification	Certified units/sales
Canada (Music Canada)	Platinum	100,000^{^}
United Kingdom (BPI)	Gold	100,000^{‡}
United States (RIAA)	5× Platinum	5,000,000^{^}
^{^} Shipments figures based on certification alone.^{‡} Sales+streaming figures based on certification alone.
