= Live at Woodstock =

Live at Woodstock may refer to:

- Live at Woodstock (Jimi Hendrix album)
- Live at Woodstock (Creedence Clearwater Revival album)
- Live at Woodstock (DMX album)
- Live at Woodstock (Joe Cocker album)
