= Flesh of My Flesh, Blood of My Blood =

1998 studio album by DMX

Studio album by DMX
- Released: December 22, 1998
- Recorded: 1998
- Genres: East Coast hip hop; horrorcore; hardcore hip hop
- Length: 69:52
- Labels: Def Jam; Ruff Ryders
- Producers: Dee (also exec.); Waah (also exec.); Swizz Beatz; PK; DJ Shok; Dame Grease; Irv Gotti

DMX chronology
| It's Dark and Hell Is Hot (1998) | Flesh of My Flesh, Blood of My Blood (1998) | Live at Woodstock (1999) |

Singles from Flesh of My Flesh, Blood of My Blood
- 1. "Slippin'" Released: November 27, 1998; 2. "No Love 4 Me" Released: January 1999

Professional ratings
Review scores
| Source | Rating |
|---|---|
| AllMusic | 4/5 stars |
| The Daily Vault | B |
| Entertainment Weekly | B+ |
| Robert Christgau | (dud) |
| Rolling Stone | 3/5 stars |
| The Source | (favorable) |

Flesh of My Flesh, Blood of My Blood is the second studio album by American rapper DMX. The album was released on December 22, 1998, by Def Jam Recordings and Ruff Ryders Entertainment, only seven months after his debut album, It's Dark and Hell Is Hot.

== Commercial performance ==
It debuted on the Billboard 200 at number one (and stayed there for three consecutive weeks) with over 670,000 units shipped in the first week. In January 1999, the album was ousted from the top spot by Britney Spears' debut, ...Baby One More Time. The album eventually went 3× platinum in the US.

DMX became the second artist to have two albums released in the same calendar year debut at number one on the Billboard 200. The latter album to have done so was released posthumously by Tupac Shakur under the alias Makaveli (his first was All Eyez on Me, while the second was The Don Killuminati: The 7 Day Theory).

== Track listing ==
Credits adapted from the album's liner notes.

| No. | Title | Writer(s) | Producer(s) | Length |
|---|---|---|---|---|
| 1. | "My Niggas" (Intro) | Earl Simmons; Kasseem Dean | Swizz Beatz | 1:27 |
| 2. | "Bring Your Whole Crew" | Simmons; Anthony Fields | PK | 3:40 |
| 3. | "Pac Man" (Skit) | | | 0:56 |
| 4. | "Ain't No Way" | Simmons; Dean | Swizz Beatz | 4:49 |
| 5. | "We Don't Give a Fuck" (featuring Jadakiss and Styles P) | Simmons; Irv Gotti; Richard Wilson | Irv Gotti; Dat Nigga Reb | 4:07 |
| 6. | "Keep Your Shit the Hardest" | Simmons; Dean | Swizz Beatz | 4:48 |
| 7. | "Coming From" (featuring Mary J. Blige) | Simmons; Fields | PK | 5:13 |
| 8. | "It's All Good" | Simmons; Dean; Taana Gardner | Swizz Beatz | 4:17 |
| 9. | "The Omen (Damien II)" (featuring Marilyn Manson) | Simmons; Dean; Damon Blackman | Swizz Beatz | 4:56 |
| 10. | "Slippin'" | Simmons; Michael Gomez; Grover Washington Jr. | DJ Shok | 5:05 |
| 11. | "No Love 4 Me" (featuring Drag-On and Swizz Beatz) | Simmons; Dean; Melvin Smalls | Swizz Beatz | 4:00 |
| 12. | "Dogs for Life" | Simmons; Blackman | Dame Grease | 5:31 |
| 13. | "Blackout" (featuring The LOX and Jay-Z) | Simmons; Dean; Jason Phillips; Sean Jacobs; David Styles; Shawn Carter | Swizz Beatz | 5:00 |
| 14. | "Flesh of My Flesh, Blood of My Blood" | Simmons; Dean | Swizz Beatz | 4:32 |
| 15. | "Heat" | Simmons; Dean | Swizz Beatz | 4:07 |
| 16. | "Prayer II/Ready to Meet Him" | Simmons; Dean | Swizz Beatz | 7:24 |

Notes

- "Bring Your Whole Crew" contains additional vocals by Anthony "PK" Fields.
- "Ain't No Way", "Flesh of My Flesh, Blood of My Blood" and "Heat" contain additional vocals by Swizz Beatz.
- "Slippin'" contains additional vocals by Tamyra Gray.

Sample credits

- "It's All Good" contains a sample of "Heartbeat", written and performed by Taana Gardner.
- "The Omen" contains an interpolation of "Damien", written by Earl Simmons and Damon Blackman.
- "Slippin'" contains a sample of "Moonstreams", written and performed by Grover Washington Jr.

== Personnel ==
- A&R [A&R Coordination For Def Jam Records] – Randy Acker
- A&R [A&R Coordination For Ruff Ryders Entertainment, Inc.] – Amelia Moore
- A&R [A&R Coordination For Ruff Ryders Entertainment] – Jay Jackson
- A&R [For Def Jam Records] – Irv Gotti
- A&R [For Ruff Ryders Entertainment, Inc.] – Dee, Waah
- Art Direction, Design – The Drawing Board
- Artwork [Ruff Ryders Art Department] – Estos, Sleep
- Executive-Producer – Dee, Waah
- Legal [Legal Counsel] – L. Londell McMillan, Matt Middleton
- Management – Ray Copeland
- Management [For] – Bar Entertainment Management
- Marketing – Jazz Young
- Mastered By – Tony Dawsey
- Photography By – Jonathan Mannion
- Stylist – Dee, Maurice Mann

== Charts ==
=== Weekly charts ===
Chart performance for Flesh of My Flesh, Blood of My Blood
| Chart (1998–99) | Peak position |
|---|---|
| Australian Dance Albums (ARIA) | 28 |
| Canada Top Albums/CDs (RPM) | 42 |
| German Albums (Offizielle Top 100) | 61 |
| UK Albums (Official Charts) | 119 |
| UK Album Downloads (Official Charts) | 49 |
| UK R&B Albums (Official Charts) | 19 |
| US Billboard 200 | 1 |
| US Top R&B/Hip-Hop Albums (Billboard) | 1 |

| Chart (2025) | Peak position |
|---|---|
| Greek Albums (IFPI) | 39 |

=== Year-end charts ===
1999 year-end chart performance for Flesh of My Flesh, Blood of My Blood
| Chart (1999) | Position |
|---|---|
| US Billboard 200 | 21 |
| US Top R&B/Hip-Hop Albums (Billboard) | 2 |

| Chart (2001) | Position |
|---|---|
| Canadian R&B Albums (Nielsen SoundScan) | 195 |

== Certifications ==
Certifications for Flesh of My Flesh, Blood of My Blood
| Region | Certification | Certified units/sales |
|---|---|---|
| Canada (Music Canada) | Gold | 50,000^{^} |
| United Kingdom (BPI) | Gold | 100,000^{^} |
| United States (RIAA) | 3× Platinum | 3,000,000^{^} |
^{^} Shipments figures based on certification alone.

== See also ==
- List of Billboard 200 number-one albums of 1998
- List of Billboard number-one R&B albums of 1998
