= Forgotten Island (soundtrack) =

2026 film soundtrack album

Forgotten Island (Original Motion Picture Soundtrack)

Soundtrack album by Nathan Matthew David and various artists
- Released: September 18, 2026
- Venues: London; Los Angeles; Manila
- Studios: Abbey Road Studios; Newman Scoring Stage, 20th Century Studios; Las Piñas
- Genres: Film score; pop; hip-hop; OPM
- Length: 87:44
- Languages: English; Filipino
- Label: Back Lot Music
- Producer: Nathan Matthew David

Nathan Matthew David chronology
Take No Prisoners (2025)	Forgotten Island (2026)

Singles from Forgotten Island (Original Motion Picture Soundtrack)
- 1. "A Parallel World" Released: July 23, 2026; 2. "B.R.B." Released: September 4, 2026

Forgotten Island (Original Motion Picture Soundtrack) is the soundtrack album to the 2026 DreamWorks Animation film Forgotten Island directed by Joel Crawford and Januel Mercado. The original score is composed by Nathan Matthew David and the soundtrack accompanies David's score alongside covers of popular songs from the 1980s and 1990s, with Filipino artists and other popular musicians. Led by two singles—"A Parallel World" and "B.R.B."—the album was released through Back Lot Music on September 18, 2026.

== Background ==
In October 2025, Nathan Matthew David was announced to be composing the film's score. To compose the score, David travelled throughout the Philippines to research on different indigenous music, including by spending time in Cordillera and Kalinga, and with the T'boli people in Lake Sebu. He also recorded the Bamboo Organ, a 19th-century church pipe organ made with bamboo, in Las Piñas, Metro Manila. Musician Farid Guinomla travelled from Mindanao to play and record the gandingan and kulintang instruments in Los Angeles. Furthermore, Talaandig artist Waway Saway performed the chanting that opens the film. Some of the gandingan patterns were developed from phrases translated into Maguindanao and subsequently interpreted through gong rhythms, giving the instruments a narrative function within the score.

David also incorporated field recordings made in the Philippines, alongside additional studio recordings to integrate the traditional musical elements into the orchestra. The recording was done in Abbey Road Studios in London where David spent a week recording strings, brass, woodwinds and choir. Additional recording session took place in Manila and Los Angeles, which involved Filipino musicians and vocalists. This included the cast member Lea Salonga, who contributed vocals to the score.

Besides the film's instrumental score, it also featured musical performances by local Filipino acts such as Bini, Salonga, SB19, Francis Magalona, Katseye's Sophia Laforteza, Ruby Ibarra, and Carl Angelo, in addition to the lead actresses H.E.R. and Liza Soberano. David co-wrote the original song "A Parallel World" with Shawn Wasabi, and performed by Bini, with assistance from Annie Nepomuceno for lyrical translation and vocal coach Anna Graham during the recording sessions. David also arranged an orchestral version of that song, featuring Bini and Salonga; the latter also performed an expanded verse and bridge of that song before being joined by the group.

== Release ==
The album was preceded by the single, "A Parallel World", performed by Bini, which released on July 23, 2026. Another song "B.R.B." performed by the lead actors, was released on September 4. The soundtrack album was released digitally by Back Lot Music on September 18, 2026, a week prior to the film's release.

== Reception ==
Todd Gilchrist of Variety called it a "lovely score" which was "frontload[ed] ... with classic '80s and '90s songs". Frank Scheck of The Hollywood Reporter wrote "Besides the several covers of '90s-era pop music classics by the likes of INXS and Tina Turner, composer Nathan Matthew David has contributed an original soundtrack incorporating traditional Filipino and Indigenous instruments." Nikki Baughan of Screen International called it "a bombastic 80s and 90s inspired soundtrack [...] never letting us catch our breath."

== Track listing ==
All tracks are written by Nathan Matthew David, except where noted.

No.	Title	Writer(s)	Artist(s)	Length
1.	"B.R.B."	Ryan Tedder; Gabriella Wilson	H.E.R. and Liza Soberano	3:33
2.	"Pasakalye"			0:56
3.	"Tayo Na"			1:18
4.	"A Parallel World"	Shawn Wasabi; David	Bini	3:38
5.	"Lola"			0:55
6.	"Tadhana"			1:48
7.	"Never Tear Us Apart"	Andrew Farriss; Michael Hutchence	Sophia of Katseye	3:16
8.	"Nakalimutan"			0:54
9.	"Susmaryosep! Hay Naku! Maanghang!"			0:43
10.	"Salbahe Ako (Note: Samples The Shadows' "Apache")"	Ibarra; Carl Angelo Viray; Antonio Cuna; Jerry Lordan	Carl Angelo and Ruby Ibarra	3:05
11.	"Ninakaw sa Akin" (feat. Lea Salonga)			1:32
12.	"Batiba"			0:58
13.	"Sarimanok"			1:03
14.	"Mga Kababayan"	Francis Magalona; Jimmy Antiporda	SB19	3:33
15.	"Bungi"			1:08
16.	"King Truffle Wuffle"			1:46
17.	"Prince Mermahn" (feat. Nico Santos)			1:49
18.	"Jerk in the Box"	Joel Crawford; David; Matt Loman; Januel P. Mercado; James Ryan	H.E.R. and Liza Soberano	0:22
19.	"Double Up"	Akeem Hayes; Paulo Rodriguez	Guapdad feat. P-Lo	1:59
20.	"Kapre"			1:40
21.	"If We Remember"			1:25
22.	"Magnanakaw" (feat. Lea Salonga)			4:17
23.	"Hulihin"			4:40
24.	"It Was You"			2:35
25.	"Balik" (feat. Lea Salonga)			2:16
26.	"All of Them"			2:07
27.	"One Last Deal"			2:44
28.	"Forgotten Friendship"			2:32
29.	"I'm So Sorry, Apo"			2:13
30.	"Without You"			0:59
31.	"Memories Are Magic"			0:58
32.	"Bahagi Mo" (feat. Lea Salonga)			1:22
33.	"Paalam, Nakali"			1:52
34.	"Jo and Raissa Suite"			6:14
35.	"Ang Manananggal Suite" (feat. Lea Salonga)			6:51
36.	"Batiba Suite"			4:30
37.	"A Parallel World"	Wasabi; David	Bini feat. Lea Salonga	4:13
Total length:				87:44

== Additional music ==
The following songs are not featured in the film's soundtrack:

- "Don't Stop Believin'" — written by Jonathan Cain, Steve Perry and Neal Schon; performed by Journey
- "Nothing's Gonna Stop Us Now" — written by Albert Hammond and Diane Warren; performed by Starship
- "Never Tear Us Apart" — performed by INXS
- "On the Wings of Love" — written by Jeffrey Osborne and Peter Schless (karaoke version performed by Raissa's father)
- "Constant Change" — written and performed by Jose Mari Chan
- "Baby Got Back" — written by Anthony Ray, performed by Jo (H.E.R.) as a distraction
- "This Is How We Do It" — performed by Montell Jordan
- "Don't You (Forget About Me)" — performed by Simple Minds
- "Party Up (Up In Here)" — performed by DMX
- "Who Let The Dogs Out" — written by Anslem Douglas and Osbert Gurley Jr.
- "Mga Kababayan" — performed by SB19
- "I See the Moon" — written by Meredith Willson
- "Don't Stop Believin' (2024 remastered)" — written by Jonathan Cain, Steve Perry and Neal Schon; performed by Journey

== Accolades ==
Award	Date of ceremony	Category	Nominee(s)	Result	Ref.
Hollywood Music in Media Awards	November 18, 2026	Best Original Song – Animated Film	"BRB" – Ryan Tedder and Gabriella Wilson	Pending	
Hollywood Music in Media Awards	November 18, 2026	Music Video	"BRB" – Bianca Catbagan and H.E.R.	Pending	
