= Fatgums production discography =

The following songs were produced by American record producer and hip-hop DJ Fatgums.

== 2000 ==
=== Fatgums and Gammaray - OHHSSH!! ===
- "Ha!" (co-produced by Gammaray)
- "Skooby" (co-produced by Gammaray)

== 2005 ==
=== The Committee - The Committee EP ===
- "Struggles"

== 2008 ==
=== Novelists - Bookends ===
- 01. "Book Begins" (co-produced by Gammaray)
- 02. "Crime In The City" (co-produced by Gammaray)
- 03. "Morning"
- 04. "Treats" (co-produced by Gammaray)
- 08. "Never There"
- 10. "Smokin'"
- 11. "Novel Scratching (feat. DJ ET, and DJ Tanner)"
- 12. "Yes Yes Yes"
- 13. "My Only Vice Remix"
- 14. "Murderous Rage"

=== Bambu - ...Exact Change... ===
- 01. "Make Change"
- 08. "Seven Months"
- 14. "Exact Change"
- 15. "Iron Bam" (co-produced by Bambu)

=== The CounterParts - Appetizer ===
- 03. "Luv What We Do"
- 04. "Blind"
- 05. "Breaking Point"
- 06. "The Hold Up"
- 07. "Re:Action"
- 08. "Guns of Wilmas (feat. Bambu)"
- 10. "Dream Deferred" (co-produced by Gammaray)

=== ReVision - Forward Progress Mixtape ===
- 01. "Forward Progress feat. DJ Krissfader"
- 09. "Daily Grind feat. C-Los"

== 2009 ==
=== Beatrock Presents: Fatgums x Bambu - ...A Peaceful Riot... ===
- 01. "Intro"
- 02. "Peddlin' Music"
- 03. "Strapped"
- 04. "Good Clothes"
- 05. "Listen"
- 06. "Words from JOMA/Words from TINO (feat. T-Know)"
- 07. "Gunslinger I"
- 08. "Gunslinger II"
- 09. "Won't Walk Away" (co-produced by Gammaray)

=== The CounterParts - The CounterParts LP ===
- 01. "Blast Off"
- 04. "What We Do"
- 06. "Guns of Cali (feat. Native Guns)"
- 10. "Re:Act"
- 14. "Until"

=== DJ Phatrick - A Song For Ourselves Mixtape ===
- 15. "Divide & Conquer (Fatgums Remix ft. Geologic, Kiwi, & Bambu)"

== 2010 ==
=== Rocky Rivera - Rocky Rivera ===
- 04. "The Rundown"

=== Bambu - ...Paper Cuts... ===
- 05. "The Queen Is Dead"

=== Power Struggle - Remittances ===
- 01. "Air Out My Lungs"
- 02. "Traveling Man"
- 05. "What Goes Up" (co-produced by Mister REY)
- 06. "Three Basic Problems (feat. Kiwi, Mister REY, BWAN, and Saico)" (co-produced by Mister REY)
- 07. "Inspired By Dream"
- 08. "Wash It Away (feat. ET)"
- 09. "Sunshine (feat. Bambu, Pele, and Tina Shauf)" (co-produced by Mister REY)
- 10. "Blood of My Heart (feat. Denizen Kane and Big Drew)"
- 12. "Kill The Vultures"

== 2011 ==
=== Bambu - ...exact change...Reloaded ===
- Disc 1 01. "Make Change"
- Disc 1 08. "Seven Months"
- Disc 1 14. "Exact Change"
- Disc 1 15. "Iron Bam" (co-produced by Bambu)
- Disc 2 08. "Jonah's Lament"

=== Dregs One - The Wake Up Call Mixtape ===
- 04. "Think About It"

=== Prometheus Brown and Bambu - Walk Into A Bar ===
- 08. "Lookin' Up"

=== Otayo Dubb - Cold Piece of Work ===
- 01. "Jerry McGuire"
- 09. "A Lil' More (feat. Bambu)"

== 2012 ==
=== Bwan - Living Room ===
- 02. "Infinite"
- 05. "Grindstone"
- 06. "Lyricists (feat. Akil)"

== 2013 ==
=== Patience - Broken Hourglass ===
- 8. "City Love"

=== Bambu - Sun Of A Gun ===
- 15. "Sun In A Million"

=== Rocky Rivera - Gangster of Love ===
- 10. "Air Mail"

== 2014 ==
=== Power Struggle - In Your Hands ===
- 4. "A Round For My Friends"
- 5. "Live That Life"
- 6. "Falling From The Sky"

== 2015 ==
=== Rocky Rivera - Nom de Guerre ===
- 2. "Godsteppin"
- 5. "Turn You"
