= The Dean Collection =

Private art collection

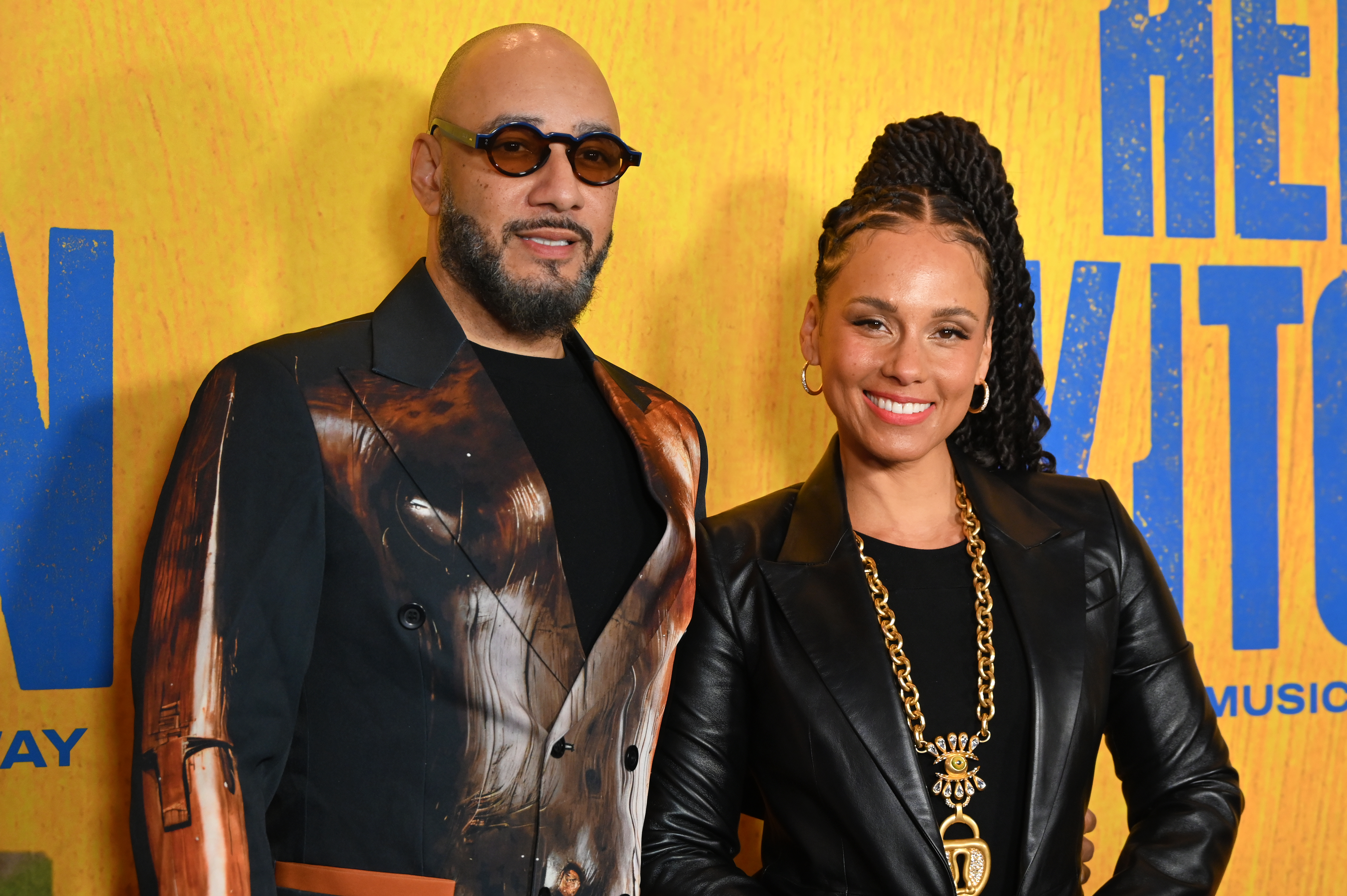
Swizz Beats and Alicia Keys.

The Dean Collection is a private art collection held by singer-songwriter Alicia Keys and producer Kasseem Dean (Swizz Beats). As of 2024, the collection was a "total assemblage of more than 1,000 pieces, worth millions of dollars."

Firstly curated and shown by the Brooklyn Museum in 2024, the Dean Collection has since shown in numerous other venues in the United States. The traveling collection, titled Giants: Art from the Dean Collection of Swizz Beats and Alicia Keys, contains nearly a hundred pieces by around forty artists from the Black diaspora including Gordon Parks, Nick Cave, Kwame Brathwaite, Arthur Jafa, Deborah Roberts, Amy Sherald, Kehinde Wiley, and many others. It is scheduled to tour internationally through to 2030.

== History ==
The Dean Collection was founded by Keys and Dean in 2014 in order to "raise the public's awareness of the artistry within Black communities." Both "art lovers," Dean stated that he and Keys began their collection because "there's not enough people of color collecting artists of color." Though the collection mostly consists of African American artists, it also includes artists based in Africa, as well as diasporic artists working in Europe. It is also the largest private collection of Parks photographs.

In February 2024, Kimberli Gant, the Brooklyn Museum's Curator of Modern and Contemporary Art, and Indira A. Abiskaroon, Curatorial Assistant of Modern and Contemporary Art, arranged an exhibition curated from the Dean Collection which was then shown in the museum's Great Hall for a limited time. The curation consists of nearly a hundred pieces.

In September 2024, the Dean Collection moved to the High Museum of Art. A gala was held, with Keys and Dean in attendance, on its opening night on September 13.

In early 2025, the Dean Collection was moved to the Minneapolis Institute of Art. Similar to its previous showing, an opening party was held. The ensuing exhibition featured a collaboration with Public Functionary, a Northeast Minneapolis arts program, through a five-week series organized around the theme of "Giants."

On November 22, 2025, the 'Giants' exhibit opened at the Virginia Museum of Fine Arts in Richmond, VA. It will stay at the VMFA until March 1, 2026.

== Exhibitions ==
- Brooklyn Museum, February 10–July 7, 2024
- High Museum of Art, September 14, 2025–January 19, 2025
- Minneapolis Institute of Art, March 8–July 13, 2025
