= Ruby Ibarra =

Filipina rapper (born 1988)

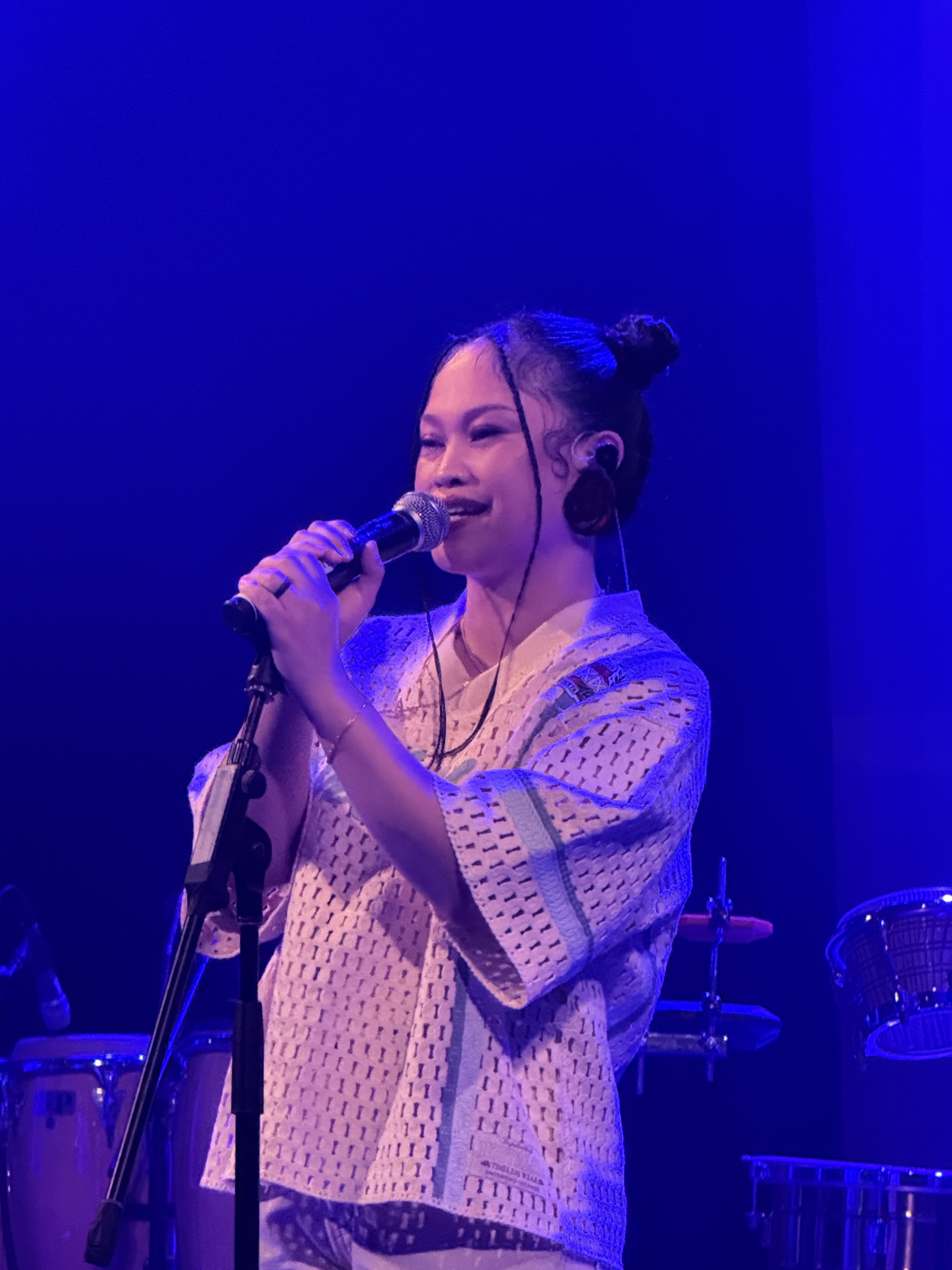
- Ibarra performing in Washington, D.C. in 2025

Background information
- Also known as: Ruby Ibarra
- Born: Ruby Anne Ibarra; February 25, 1988 (age 38); Tacloban, Leyte, Philippines
- Genre: Hip hop
- Occupations: Rapper; music producer; songwriter; spoken word artist
- Instruments: Vocals; keyboards; sampler
- Years active: 2011–present
- Label: Beatrock Music
- Website: rubyibarra.com

Ruby Anne Ibarra (born February 25, 1988) is a Filipina rapper. She raps in Tagalog, Bisaya, and English. Her raps concern her cultural heritage and her experiences as an immigrant to the United States from the Philippines. In 2023, Ibarra co-founded a record label, Bolo Music Group, which highlights Filipino American artists.

== Early life ==
Ibarra was born in the Philippines. Ruby spent around four years of her life in the city of Tacloban, she was inspired by a television performance by Filipino rapper Francis Magalona. Her family immigrated to San Lorenzo, California, and she was raised in the Bay Area. She attended the University of California, Davis and performed with spoken word collective, SickSpits. Ruby attributes her identity in music from growing up in the early nineties with hip-hop influences of Tupac, Eminem, Wu-Tang Clan, etc.

== Music career ==
Ibarra released her Lost In Translation mixtape, hosted by DJ Kay Slay, on December 12, 2012. The mixtape debuted that evening on Eminem's Shade45 channel on Sirius XM Radio, where she was interviewed live by DJ Kay Slay.

On November 5, 2015, she officially signed to independent record label, Beatrock Music, and announced that she would release her full-length debut album with them in 2016. She began recording the album with Fatgums in Inglewood, California, in March 2016. On October 3, 2017, she released her album Circa 1991 where she documents social justice issues like immigration and trauma, and she made her mark in her local music industry. She is described by people as reflective of who they are and the experiences they have had in the United States.

In January 2018, Ibarra was featured in a national MasterCard TV commercial with singer SZA and other breakout artists to promote the Start Something Priceless campaign.

In 2018, Ibarra had done 6 projects with The Filipino Channel: Cinematografo: Performance and Music Licensing- Discovering Routes: Music Licensing- Kasayahan Festival in Daly City: Performance- 24x24: Feature not yet released- Balitang America: Jocelyn Enriquez x Ruby Ibarra Feature- Gifts of Love: Performance for ABS CBN Foundation. Ruby Ibarra's 2018 documentary - Nothing on US: Pinays Rising - was featured in multiple countries and film festivals including Guam, Toronto, San Francisco, and Boston.

On June 29, 2019, Ibarra performed at the Smithsonian Folklife Festival alongside DJ Mister REY on the National Mall in Washington, D.C. Ibarra performed at The Getty on February 15, 2020, in collaboration with the Smithsonian Folklife Festival. On August 29, 2021, Ibarra performed at A Night of "Pinoy"tainment! at John Anson Ford Amphitheatre in Los Angeles

In 2023, Ibarra was awarded a Vilcek Foundation award for Creative Promise with a cash prize of $50,000. That same year, Ibarra co-founded her record label Bolo Music Group, which highlights Filipino American artists.

In addition to Ruby’s individual platforms, she has team support from the following platforms to distribute her content: Myx TV (CableTv & Online broadcast in more than 15 million households on cable providers such as Comcast, Time Warner, Cox, Bright House and DIRECTV) and DASH Radio (a global digital radio broadcasting platform with more than 80 original stations and 10 million+ listeners around the world).

Ibarra has 45,400 subscribers on YouTube and combined presence of nearly 3 million views on YouTube.

In 2025, she was declared the Tiny Desk Music contest winner. That same year, Ibarra toured the United States for the Tiny Desk Contest On The Road tour with her bandmates Anna Candari, Han Han, June Millington, Ouida, Camille Ramirez and Jojo Ramirez.

Recent partnerships & features include the following corporations:

- Pandora
- Apple
- Reebok
- Forbes (Mastercard)
- BRWNGRLZ
- BuzzFeed
- Vice
- NBC News
- NPR

Ibarra's song "Us," featuring Rocky Rivera, Klassy and Faith Santilla, can be found in the video game NBA 2K23.

== Style ==
Ibarra describes her style as reminiscent of 1990s hip hop; she cites Lupe Fiasco and Raekwon as her influences.

== Personal life ==
Ibarra is a UC Davis graduate. She lives in Hayward and previously worked as a scientist in the quality-control department of a Bay Area biotech firm. Ruby's mother had an accounting degree from the Philippines before she migrated to the US with Ruby and her sister to fulfil her American Dream.

Ruby Ibarra co-founded the Pinay Rising scholarship program for mainly Filipina students in higher education, who are also pursuing visual & performing arts or any social work field.

In 2024 Ibarra announced her pregnancy with the release of the music video "Bakunawa".

== Discography ==
=== Albums ===
- Circa91 (Beatrock Music, October 3, 2017)

=== EPs ===
- Lost in Translation mixtape (Independent, December 2012)

== Videography ==
- 2018: Here
- 2018: Us
- 2019: Taking Names

== See also ==
- Filipino hip hop
