= ...A Peaceful Riot... =

Studio album by Fatgums X Bambu
- Released: April 25, 2009
- Recorded: 2008–2009
- Genre: Hip hop
- Label: Beatrock Music
- Producer: Fatgums, Gammaray

Professional ratings
Review scores
Source	Rating
RapReviews.com	8.5/10 stars

...A Peaceful Riot... is the debut EP by underground hip hop duo Fatgums & Bambu, released on April 25, 2009. Prior to the release, the duo's rapper Bambu had released three solo albums entitled Self Untitled..., ...I Scream Bars for the Children..., and ...Exact Change..., and one album entitled Barrel Men as a member of the group Native Guns.

== Track listing ==
No.	Title	Producer	Length
1.	"Intro"	Fatgums	1:20
2.	"Peddlin' Music"	Fatgums	2:59
3.	"Strapped"	Fatgums	3:55
4.	"Good Clothes"	Fatgums	3:48
5.	"Listen"	Fatgums	3:32
6.	"Words from JOMA/Words from TINO" (feat. T-Know of The CounterParts)	Fatgums	2:59
7.	"Gunslinger I"	Fatgums	3:35
8.	"Gunslinger II"	Fatgums	3:52
9.	"Won't Walk Away"	Fatgums and Gammaray	3:57
10.	"Black Smile"	Gammaray	4:45
