= Party Up (Up in Here) =

2000 single by DMX

Single by DMX

from the album ... And Then There Was X
- Released: February 11, 2000
- Recorded: 1999
- Genre: Hip-hop; East Coast hip-hop; hardcore hip-hop
- Length: 4:28: 3:50 (radio edit)
- Label: Ruff Ryders; Def Jam
- Songwriters: Earl Simmons; Kasseem Dean
- Producer: Swizz Beatz

DMX singles chronology
"What's My Name" (2000)	"Party Up (Up in Here)" (2000)	"What These Bitches Want" (2000)

Music video
- "Party Up (Up in Here)" on YouTube

"Party Up (Up in Here)" is a song by American rapper DMX, released as the second single from his third album ... And Then There Was X (1999) and was his most successful single (in the US). There are three versions of the song: an explicit/album version; a censored album version, and a radio/video edit version. It was nominated for the Grammy Award for Best Rap Solo Performance but lost to Eminem's "The Real Slim Shady".

The song was voted number 56 on VH1's 100 Greatest Songs of the '00s. It was listed at No. 388 on Rolling Stone's "Top 500 Greatest Songs of All Time" in 2021.

== Music video ==
The music video depicts DMX as being caught up in a case of mistaken identity at a bank holdup. The video premiered on the week of April 3, 2000. It has over 197 million views on YouTube as of January 2026. The video was shot at the Frost Bank building on Market Street in Galveston, Texas.

== In media and sports ==
"Party Up" is used by Chilean wrestler Perfecto Bundy, as his entrance song.

The 1999-2000 Los Angeles Lakers were heard singing the song’s hook after their series-clinching win over the Indiana Pacers in the 2000 NBA Finals.

The song is played at Lincoln Financial Field at every Philadelphia Eagles home game every time the Philadelphia Eagles score a touchdown, at Dodger Stadium at every Los Angeles Dodgers home game when they hit a home run, and at T-Mobile Park when the Seattle Mariners hit a home run.

Electronic Arts licensed the track for the 2003 sports video game Tiger Woods PGA Tour 2004, where it plays as an intro.

The song was featured in the 2026 DreamWorks Animation film Forgotten Island but does not appear on its soundtrack.

On November 14, 2026. the song was used by All Elite Wrestling (AEW) on the Full Gear Pay-per-view, during its Anarchy in the Arena match. The song looped multiple times during the match.

== Charts ==
=== Weekly charts ===
Chart (2000)	Peak position
US Billboard Hot 100	27
US Hot R&B/Hip-Hop Songs (Billboard)	8
US Hot Rap Songs (Billboard)	11
US Pop Airplay (Billboard)	39
US Rhythmic Airplay (Billboard)	7

Chart (2021)	Peak position
US Billboard Hot 100	40
US Hot R&B/Hip-Hop Songs (Billboard)	20

=== Year-end charts ===
Chart (2000)	Position
US Billboard Hot 100	71
US Hot R&B/Hip-Hop Songs (Billboard)	30

== Certifications ==
Region	Certification	Certified units/sales
Brazil (Pro-Música Brasil)	Gold	30,000^{‡}
United Kingdom (BPI)	Gold	400,000^{‡}
United States (RIAA)	3× Platinum	3,000,000^{‡}
^{‡} Sales+streaming figures based on certification alone.
