= What These Bitches Want =

Single by DMX featuring Sisqó

from the album ... And Then There Was X
- B-side: "Fame"
- Released: June 6, 2000
- Recorded: 1999
- Genre: East Coast hip-hop; R&B
- Length: 4:37
- Label: Ruff Ryders; Def Jam
- Songwriters: Earl Simmons; Mark Andrews; Tamir Ruffin; Phillip Weatherspoon
- Producer: Nokio the N-Tity

DMX singles chronology
"Party Up (Up in Here)" (2000)	"What These Bitches Want" (2000)	"Don't You Ever?" (2000)

Sisqó singles chronology
"Thong Song" (2000)	"What These Bitches Want" (2000)	"Incomplete" (2000)

"What These Bitches Want" (edited for radio as "What You Want" or "What They Really Want") is a song by American rapper DMX, released as the third single from his third album ... And Then There Was X (1999). The song features Sisqó from the group Dru Hill, while his fellow group member Nokio the N-Tity produced the song and provided background vocals. The subject matter in the song is past women in DMX's life.

In August 2019, the song regained prominence on social media 19 years after its initial release date when a DMX challenge surfaced on the internet. For the challenge, women piece together photos and clips of themselves in various hairstyles, switching the images to the song's lyrics to suggest that they're a different person with every hairstyle.

== Music video ==
The music video was directed by Hype Williams.

== Charts ==
Chart (2000)	Peak position
US Billboard Hot 100	49
US Radio Songs (Billboard)	42
US Hot R&B/Hip-Hop Songs (Billboard)	11
US R&B/Hip-Hop Airplay (Billboard)	9
US Rhythmic Airplay (Billboard)	29

== Certifications ==
Region	Certification	Certified units/sales
United States (RIAA)	Gold	500,000^{‡}
^{‡} Sales+streaming figures based on certification alone.
