= What's My Name? (DMX song) =

1999 single by DMX

Single by DMX

from the album ... And Then There Was X
- Released: December 28, 1999
- Recorded: 1999
- Genre: Hardcore hip-hop; gangsta rap
- Length: 3:52
- Label: Ruff Ryders; Def Jam
- Songwriters: Earl Simmons; Edward Hinson; Irving Lorenzo
- Producers: Self Edward Hinson; Irv Gotti

DMX singles chronology
"No Love 4 Me" (1999)	"What's My Name?" (1999)	"Party Up (Up In Here)" (2000)

"What's My Name?" is a song by American rapper DMX, released as the first single released from his third album ... And Then There Was X (1999). The single peaked at #67 on the Billboard Hot 100 in the U.S. "What's My Name?" was produced by Self and co-produced by Irv Gotti. It went Gold on May 21, 2021 with all of his other Rap Songs.

== Music video ==
The video for "What's My Name?" (directed by Little X) is somewhat similar to Lenny Kravitz's "Are You Gonna Go My Way". The music video features guest appearances from Jay-Z, Ja Rule, Ruff Ryders, Irv Gotti and Murder Inc.

== Charts ==
=== Weekly charts ===
Chart (1999–2000)	Peak position
US Billboard Hot 100	67
US Hot R&B/Hip-Hop Songs (Billboard)	23
US Hot Rap Songs (Billboard)	11
US Rhythmic Airplay (Billboard)	33

=== Year-end charts ===
Chart (2000)	Position
US Hot R&B/Hip-Hop Songs (Billboard)	90

== Certifications ==
Region	Certification	Certified units/sales
United States (RIAA)	Gold	500,000^{‡}
^{‡} Sales+streaming figures based on certification alone.
