= It's Dark and Hell Is Hot =

1998 studio album by DMX

Studio album by DMX
- Released: May 19, 1998
- Recorded: October 1997 - April 1998
- Studios: New Horizon Sounds, Capitol Heights, Maryland; Power House; Soundtrack; Chung King; Quad Recording, New York City
- Genres: East Coast hip-hop; horrorcore; hardcore hip-hop
- Length: 65:10
- Labels: Ruff Ryders; Def Jam
- Producers: Irv Gotti (also exec.); Dee (exec.); Dame Grease (also exec.); P.K.; Lil Rob; Swizz Beatz

DMX chronology
It's Dark and Hell Is Hot (1998)	Flesh of My Flesh, Blood of My Blood (1998)

Singles from It's Dark and Hell Is Hot
- 1. "Get at Me Dog" Released: February 10, 1998; 2. "Stop Being Greedy" Released: March 7, 1998; 3. "Ruff Ryders' Anthem" Released: May 5, 1998; 4. "How's It Goin' Down" Released: June 9, 1998

It's Dark and Hell Is Hot is the debut studio album by American rapper DMX. It was released on May 19, 1998, by Def Jam Recordings and Ruff Ryders Entertainment. It was supported by four singles—"Get at Me Dog", "Stop Being Greedy", "Ruff Ryders' Anthem" and "How's It Goin' Down", in order of release—and their accompanying music videos.

It primarily includes production from Dame Grease (13 tracks) and PK (8 tracks), in addition to production from Irv Gotti and Lil Rob (2 tracks), Younglord (1 track; add.), and Swizz Beatz (1 track). The album is widely considered a classic among hip-hop fans and critics.

== Background and production ==
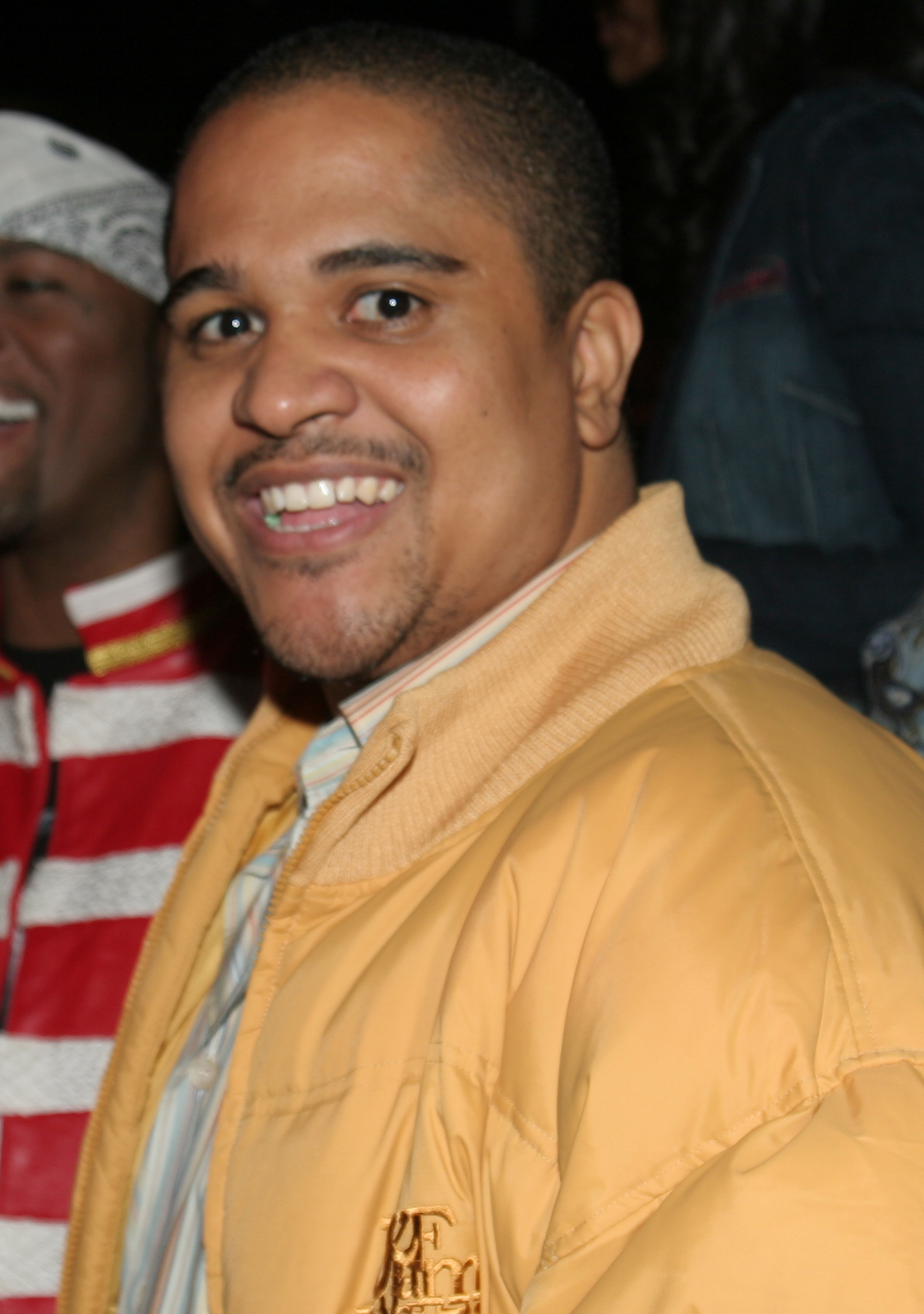
Producers Irv Gotti (left) and Dame Grease (right)

During the album's production, DMX was struggling with his mental health due to his rough upbringing and being in and out of jail so often, saying that he was "hell mentally and could hear the devil speaking to him," It's Dark and Hell Is Hot was made as a way to portray DMX's that mental state at the time. Producer Dame Grease recalled that the goal was to make an album, “free of gimmicks,” and to portray, “the essence of grittiness.” The album also served as a response to the bling era of hip hop, specifically the music made by rappers gaining popularity in Puff Daddy's record label Bad Boy Records.

The rawness of the album was also guided by the recording environment DMX and his producers were in; Grease says the production for It's Dark and Hell Is Hot was hectic, recalling moments of people smoking weed, people getting haircuts, and people selling hotdogs and CDs in and outside the studio.

=== Ruff Ryders' Anthem ===
Ruff Ryders' Anthem was produced by then up and coming Atlanta producer Swizz Beatz. The instrumental was made before Swizz moved to New York City to produce for Ruff Ryders. At the time, Swizz was better known as a DJ and had trouble finding work as a producer. The instrumental was a mix of the New York hip-hop Swizz had been exposed with and the Atlanta hip-hop he grew up with. DMX was initially hesitant to add the song to the album, saying that the beat was simple and repetitive, his lyrics weren't very substantive, and the song overall was, "like fucking ABC’s, like elementary."

== Album cover ==
The album cover was shot by photographer Jonathan Mannion on March 9th, 1998. Mannion and DMX met on the set of rapper LL Cool J's music video of 4, 3, 2, 1. The monochrome photo, originally black and white, depicts DMX, shirtless and arms crossed, a pose that Mannion says, "really captured who he was at that moment." Mannion would later shoot for DMX's next album, Flesh of My Flesh, Blood of My Blood.

== Critical reception ==
Professional ratings
Review scores
Source	Rating
AllMusic	4/5 stars
Entertainment Weekly	C
Los Angeles Times	2/4 stars
Muzik	3/5 stars
Pitchfork	9.0/10
Q	4/5 stars
Rolling Stone	3/5 stars
The Rolling Stone Album Guide	4/5 stars
The Source	4/5 stars
Spin	6/10

It's Dark and Hell Is Hot was initially met with fairly positive reviews from music critics. Leading hip-hop magazine The Source described the album as "a mind-gripping opus that fully encompasses the appeal of one of rap's newest sensations."

Michael A. Gonzales of music magazine Spin gave the album a mixed review. He called the album, "a psychotic concept album that celebrates bloody style over creative substance." He also commended the instrumentals of the track, calling it, "rough, minimalistic" and "often infectious" while also critiquing the albums, "plain ugly," lyrics, using the "rape fantasy" concept of X-Is Coming as example. Miles M. Lewis of Rolling Stone gave a lukewarm review of the album, saying that the album, "delivers on some of the promise of DMX's many cameos but ultimately falls short of expectations." Soren Baker of the Los Angeles Times says the album, "listless production" doesn't match well with DMX's, "seething, maniacal rants," adding that the album instrumentally, "purr rather than roar."

== Commercial performance ==
It's Dark and Hell Is Hot debuted at number one on the US Billboard 200 chart, selling 251,000 copies in its first week, the first DMX number one debut on the chart. On December 18, 2000, the album was certified four times platinum by the Recording Industry Association of America (RIAA) for shipments of four million copies in the US.

== Legacy ==
It's Dark and Hell is Hot has since received retrospective reviews giving the album critical praise. AllMusic commented that, "Unlike so many other hardcore rappers who are more rhetorical than physical, DMX commands an aggressive aura without even speaking a word." In 2017, Sheldon Pearce of Pitchfork wrote, "The debut album from DMX is the Dante's Inferno of rap. His infamous stage presence and aggression gave a voice to the voiceless in the streets of New York and overnight changed the course of hip-hop."

Andrew R. Chow from Time published an article about the album on the day of DMX's passing (April 9, 2021) saying, "Then 27-year-old Earl Simmons, better known as DMX, released his debut album It's Dark and Hell Is Hot, and everything changed. The album was full of violent nihilism, hair-raising tales of betrayal and revenge, and his emulations of dogs barking and whining; the beats were rugged and skeletal. Rather than being rejected or pigeonholed, the album immediately skyrocketed to the top of the charts, selling 251,000 copies in its first week in the U.S as songs like "Ruff Ryders' Anthem" rang out of every car stereo in New York City and beyond." He also wrote the album was catalyst for American producer Swizz Beatz's career and influenced artists later on like American rapper Denzel Curry, who listed it as one of his favorite albums. Nas reminisced in 2013, "that was the year DMX took over the world."

In 2022, Rolling Stone ranked the album twenty-second on their list of "The 200 Greatest Hip-Hop Albums of All Time". That same year, Pitchfork ranked the album 79th on their list of "The 150 Best Albums of the 1990s."

Canadian recording artist Drake interpolated "How's It Going Down" on his 2016 song "U With Me". He personally asked DMX for his permission.

== Track listing ==
Standard edition
No.	Title	Writer(s)	Producer(s)	Length
1.	"Intro"	Earl Simmons; Irving Lorenzo; James Mtume	Irv Gotti; Lil Rob	4:10
2.	"Ruff Ryders' Anthem"	Simmons; Kaseem Dean	Swizz Beatz	3:34
3.	"Fuckin' wit' D"	Simmons; Anthony Fields; Damon Blackman; Larry Mizell; Alphonso Mizell	PK; Dame Grease (add.)	2:18
4.	"The Storm" (skit)	Simmons; Blackman; Fields; Joaquin Dean; Mad Man	Dame Grease; PK; Waah (add.); Mad Man (add.)	1:01
5.	"Look Thru My Eyes"	Simmons; Fields; Blackman	PK; Dame Grease (co.)	3:51
6.	"Get at Me Dog" (featuring Sheek Louch)	Simmons; Irv Gotti; Fields; Blackman; Sam Taylor	Dame Grease; PK (add.)	4:03
7.	"Let Me Fly"	Simmons; Blackman; Richard Frierson; Manuel Alejandro; Ana Magdalena	Dame Grease; Young Lord (add.)	4:13
8.	"X-Is Coming"	Simmons; Fields	PK	4:19
9.	"Damien"	Simmons; Blackman	Dame Grease	3:42
10.	"How's It Goin' Down"	Simmons; Fields	PK	4:43
11.	"Mickey" (skit)	Simmons; Fields; J. Dean; Rajah Winn	PK	0:25
12.	"Crime Story"	Simmons; Lorenzo; Freddie Perren	Irv Gotti; Lil Rob	3:48
13.	"Stop Being Greedy"	Simmons; Fields; Michael Masser	PK; Dame Grease (add.)	3:37
14.	"ATF"	Simmons; Blackman	Dame Grease	1:56
15.	"For My Dogs" (featuring Big Stan, Loose, Kasino and Drag-On)	Simmons; Blackman; Dennis Joyner; Kendall Carter; Kimani Davis; Mel Jason Smalls	Dame Grease	4:11
16.	"I Can Feel It"	Simmons; Blackman; Phil Collins	Dame Grease	4:13
17.	"Prayer" (skit)	Simmons	Dame Grease	2:32
18.	"The Convo"	Simmons; Blackman; Barry Alan Gibb; Maurice Ernest Gibb; Robin Hugh Gibb; Ed Penney; Jerry Gillespie	Dame Grease	3:34
19.	"Niggaz Done Started Something" (featuring The LOX and Murda Ma$e)	Simmons; Blackman; Jason Phillips; Sean Jacobs; David Styles; Mason Betha	Dame Grease	5:14
Total length:				65:10

2000 reissue bonus track
No.	Title	Writer(s)	Producer(s)	Length
20.	"Ruff Ryders' Anthem" (Live)	Simmons; K. Dean	Swizz Beatz	2:57
Total length:				68:07

Notes

- Track listing and credits from album booklet.
- "X-Is Coming" features additional vocals by Jamie, Warren and Randy.
- "How's It Goin' Down" features additional vocals by Lovey Ford and Schamika Grant.
- "I Can Feel It" features additional vocals by Nardo.

Sample credits

- "Intro" contains a sample of "Beyond Forever" performed by James Mtume.
- "Fuckin' wit' D" contains a sample of "Shifting Gears" performed by Johnny "Hammond" Smith.
- "Get At Me Dog" contains a sample of "Everything Good to You" performed by B. T. Express.
- "Let Me Fly" contains a sample of "Lo Dudo" performed by José José.
- "Damien" contains a sample of "Slow Dance" performed by Stanley Clarke and Harpsichord Concerto in D minor, BWV 1052 by Johann Sebastian Bach
- "How's It Going Down" contains a sample of "God Made Me Funky" performed by The Headhunters.
- "Crime Story" contains a sample of "Easin' In" performed by Edwin Starr.
- "Stop Being Greedy" contains a sample of "My Hero Is a Gun" performed by Diana Ross.
- "I Can Feel It" contains a sample of "In the Air Tonight" performed by Phil Collins.
- "The Convo" contains a sample of "Nights on Broadway" performed by The Bee Gees, and an interpolation of "Somebody's Knockin'" performed by Terri Gibbs.
- "Niggaz Done Start Something" contains a sample of "Mercy, Mercy Me (The Ecology)" performed by Marvin Gaye.

Courtesies

- The Lox and Mase appear courtesy of Bad Boy Records.
- Big Stan, Loose and Drag-On appears courtesy of Ruff Ryders Entertainment.
- Kasino appears courtesy of Jive Records.

== Charts ==
=== Weekly charts ===
Chart (1998)	Peak position
Canadian Albums (Billboard)	15
UK Albums (Official Charts)	89
UK R&B Albums (Official Charts)	11
US Billboard 200	1
US Top R&B/Hip-Hop Albums (Billboard)	1

Chart (2021)	Peak position
Belgian Albums (Ultratop Flanders)	185

Chart (2024)	Peak position
Greek Albums (IFPI)	72

=== Year-end charts ===
Chart (1998)	Position
US Billboard 200	34
US Top R&B/Hip-Hop Albums (Billboard)	2

Chart (1999)	Position
US Billboard 200	33
US Top R&B/Hip-Hop Albums (Billboard)	16

== Certifications ==
Region	Certification	Certified units/sales
Canada (Music Canada)	Platinum	100,000^{^}
United Kingdom (BPI)	Gold	100,000^{*}
United States (RIAA)	4× Platinum	4,000,000^{^}
^{*} Sales figures based on certification alone.^{^} Shipments figures based on certification alone.

== See also ==
- List of number-one albums of 1998 (U.S.)
- List of number-one R&B albums of 1998 (U.S.)
