= Abdullah Sakkijha Jewelry =

Jewelry brand

- Company type: Private
- Industry: Jewelry
- Founded: 1970
- Founder: Mohammad Sakkijha Ze Audio
- Headquarters: Amman, Jordan
- Number of employees: 28
- Website: https://abdullahsakkijha.com/

Abdullah Sakkijha Jewelry is a jewelry brand founded in 1970, operating in Jordan and across the region. The jewelry have been worn by famous pan region celebrities, including Jordanian actress Saba Mubarak at the 78th Venice Film Festival, and Angolan model Maria Borges alongside Egyptian actress Hana El Zahed at the 2024 Cannes Film Festival.

== History ==
Abdullah Sakkijha Jewelry was founded by Mohammad Sakkijha in Jordan, in 1970. Sakkijha, being from a family with experience in culture, established his jewelry showroom in Sweifieh, Amman Abdullah Sakkijha Jewelry was recognized as the top Jewelry Designer of 2023 at the 14th Arab Satellite Festival. At the same year, he received a Certificate of Appreciation for his involvement in the "Kotler Jordan" project by publication of the "Essentials of Modern Marketing – First Jordan Edition."

In 2023, Abdullah Sakkijha introduced a new collection called "Rajein," drawing inspiration from the Palestinian cause. The collection includes symbols reflecting the Palestinian struggle for land rights. In the same year, Fox Collection (inspired by the Arabian Fox) and Solar System Collection were represented too.

The company operates multiple stores globally, including its flagship location in Amman, Jordan.
