= Ruff Ryders' Anthem =

1998 single by DMX

Single by DMX

from the album It's Dark and Hell Is Hot
- Released: May 5, 1998
- Recorded: February 1998
- Genre: Hardcore hip-hop
- Length: 3:34
- Label: Ruff Ryders; Def Jam
- Songwriters: Earl Simmons; Kasseem Dean
- Producer: Swizz Beatz

DMX singles chronology
"Money, Power & Respect" (1998)	"Ruff Ryders' Anthem" (1998)	"How's It Goin' Down" (1998)

Music video
- "Ruff Ryders' Anthem" on YouTube

"Ruff Ryders' Anthem" is a song by American rapper DMX, released on May 5, 1998, as the third single from his debut studio album It's Dark and Hell Is Hot (1998). In 2008, the song was ranked at number 79 on VH1's 100 Greatest Songs of Hip Hop. In the US, upon the song's initial release it had originally peaked at number 93 on the Billboard Hot 100 chart, before reaching a new peak of number 16 following DMX's death in April 2021.

== Background and conception ==
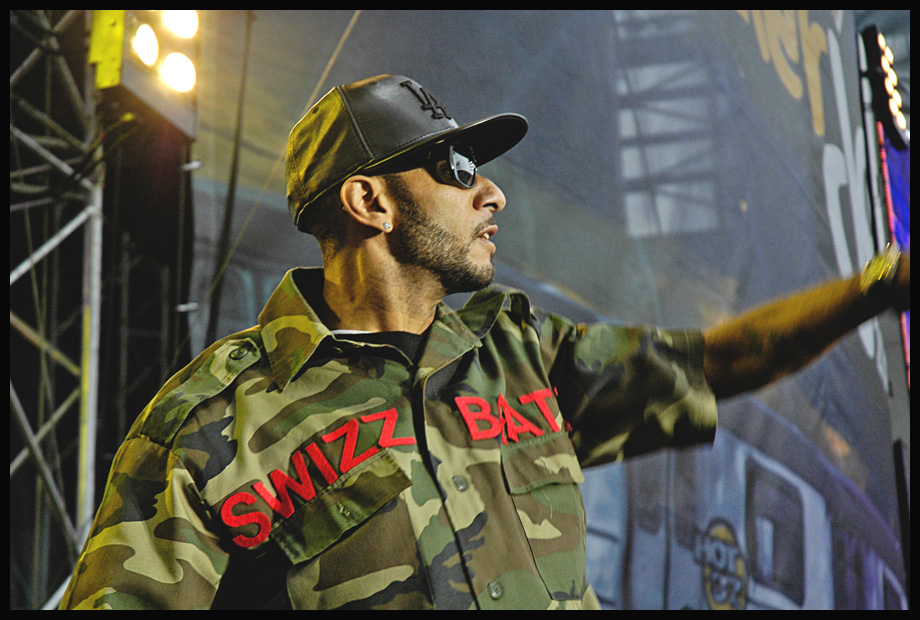
Ruff Ryders' Anthem was produced by then up-and-coming Swizz Beatz.

"Ruff Ryders' Anthem" was produced by Kasseem Dean, at the time an up-and-coming musician better known as Swizz Beatz. Swizz Beatz had been introduced to DMX by his uncles Darrin and Joaquin Dean, who are co-founders of the Ruff Ryders. According to Swizz Beatz, DMX had initially rejected the production: "I made the 'Ruff Ryders Anthem' beat in Atlanta. It was me just bugging out, having my New York influence and having my Atlanta influence. That track was the perfect blend which was awkward and different at the time because nobody had ever heard anything like that. DMX didn't want to do it. He was like, 'Man, that sounds like some rock 'n' roll track, I need some hip-hop shit. I'm not doing that. It's not hood enough." Despite Swizz Beatz's best efforts, it wasn't until Darrin and Joaquin Dean convinced DMX to give the track a chance that he did so.

== Composition ==
The background vocals and beat follow the rhythm of a military cadence to coincide with the hook's theme of being a cohesive unit. Swizz Beatz once recalled how the 'What!' ad-libs formulated, stating "The 'What!' ad-lib and all of that came about in the middle of us hyping him up. We left it in the track to add energy. Collectively, we came up with that vibe".

== Music video ==
The official music video was directed by J. Jesses Smith, who had previously worked with DMX on the visuals for "Get at Me Dog". Rappers Fredro Starr and Sticky Fingaz and DMX's Ruff Ryders label-mates The LOX, Eve, and Swizz Beatz, all make cameo appearances in the video. By July 2025, it had over 245 million views on YouTube.

== Charts ==
1998 weekly chart performance for "Ruff Ryders' Anthem"
Chart (1998-1999)	Peak position
U.S. Billboard Hot 100	93
U.S. Hot R&B/Hip-Hop Singles & Tracks (Billboard)	33

2021 weekly chart performance for "Ruff Ryders' Anthem"
Chart (2021)	Peak position
Canada Hot 100 (Billboard)	36
UK Hip Hop/R&B (Official Charts)	29
US Billboard Hot 100	16
US Hot R&B/Hip-Hop Songs (Billboard)	9

== Ruff Ryders' Anthem remix ==
"Ruff Ryders' Anthem" (remix)

Single by DJ Clue featuring DMX, Jadakiss, Styles P, Drag-On and Eve

from the album The Professional
- Released: 1999
- Recorded: 1998
- Genre: Gangsta rap; East Coast hip-hop
- Length: 3:52
- Label: Roc-A-Fella; Def Jam
- Songwriters: Simmons; Kaseem Dean
- Producers: Swizz Beatz; DJ Clue; Ken "Duro" Ifill

DJ Clue singles chronology
"I Like Control" (1999)	"Ruff Ryders' Anthem" (remix) (1999)	"Back 2 Life 2001" (2000)

Jadakiss singles chronology
"Banned From T.V." (1998)	"Ruff Ryders' Anthem" (remix) (1999)	"The Best of Me" (2000)

Styles P singles chronology
"Banned from T.V." (1998)	"Ruff Ryders' Anthem" (remix) (1999)	"We Gonna Make It" (2001)

DMX singles chronology
"Money, Cash, Hoes" (1998)	"Ruff Ryders' Anthem" (remix) (1999)	"No Love 4 Me" (1999)

Drag-On singles chronology
"Ruff Ryders' Anthem" (remix) (1999)	"Ryde or Die" (1999)

Eve singles chronology
"Girlfriend/Boyfriend" (1999)	"Ruff Ryders' Anthem" (remix) (1999)	"What Ya Want" (1999)

"Ruff Ryders' Anthem remix" is a song featuring vocals from American rappers and Ruff Ryders cohorts DMX, Jadakiss, Styles P, Drag-On and Eve. The song was released in 1999 as the third and final single from DJ Clue's solo debut album, The Professional (1998).

The remix charted on the US Billboard Hot R&B/Hip-Hop Songs chart and was later featured in Grand Theft Auto: Liberty City Stories in the ingame radio station The Liberty Jam. In 2020, the song was featured in the video game Call of Duty: Warzone.

=== Charts ===
Chart (1999)	Position
U.S. Billboard Hot R&B/Hip-Hop Singles & Tracks	16

== Certifications ==
Region	Certification	Certified units/sales
United Kingdom (BPI)	Silver	200,000^{‡}
United States (RIAA)	2× Platinum	2,000,000^{‡}
^{‡} Sales+streaming figures based on certification alone.
