= Stop Being Greedy =

Single by DMX

from the album It's Dark and Hell Is Hot
- Released: March 7, 1998
- Recorded: October 1997
- Genre: Horrorcore; hardcore hip-hop
- Length: 3:37
- Label: Ruff Ryders; Def Jam
- Songwriters: Earl Simmons; Anthony Fields; Michael Masser
- Producers: P.K.; Dame Grease

DMX singles chronology
"Get at Me Dog" (1998)	"Stop Being Greedy" (1998)	"Money, Power & Respect" (1998)

"Stop Being Greedy" is the second single by DMX from his debut studio album. The single peaked at No.79 on the Billboard Hot 100 in the US.

== Background ==
The instrumental was produced by P.K. for Ruff Ryders Entertainment and Dame Grease. The music video for the song was shot in the town of Chester, New York, and features the old MSB bank and the Glenmere Mansion. The song samples "My Hero Is a Gun" by Diana Ross from the 1975 film Mahogany.

== Critical reception ==
The song received positive reviews from music critics. They highlighted its aggressive delivery and lyrical themes. In a retrospective assessment, Rolling Stone described the track as a "blunt warning" characterized by "hoarse, shotgun-blast couplets" over a "menacing string loop", comparing DMX's message of wealth redistribution to that of a "hip-hop Robin Hood". Reviewing the song's thematic structure for Medium, writer Marcus Shorter wrote that the track presents a complex "parable of aspiration vs. despair", showing DMX split between a street pragmatist and a nihilist over "swirling strings and a menacing bassline".

== Charts ==
Chart	Peak position
US Billboard Hot 100	79
US Billboard Hot R&B/Hip-Hop Singles and Tracks	45
