= Monster Go-DJ =

- Inventor: JD Sound
- Inception: 2012
- Available: Available
- Current supplier: Monster
- Website: monsterproducts.com/godj/

The Monster Go-DJ is a standalone portable DJ mixing unit from Monster Group.

== Features ==
=== Hardware ===
The Monster GO-DJ has two LCD touch screens, one on either side of a physical interface comprising rotary knobs and a cross-fader. The rotary knobs are dual-mode, having a second function when pressed. The hardware section also has transport buttons, status LEDs around the rotaries, and beat indication LEDs.

In addition to a headphone jack that carries a different signal from the main output jack, the unit also has microphone and line inputs.

Data are stored both in internal memory and on an SD Card.

=== Firmware ===
Each of the main screens displays a wheel that resembles a record that can be used for scratching. It can also be used for pitch bends, spin downs, and juggling. Various other screens are reached from the main screen by swiping.

One of these screens provides a three-band visual EQ. There are also seven other effects, including a flanger, delay, phaser, and decimator, as well as a filter, roll, and bit crusher. The effects, which are DSP effects, are wet/dry adjustable, and some have tweakable parameters.

The GO-DJ allows portions of the tracks being played to be looped, and additionally features a sequencer and sample player. Autosync is provided for automatic mixing, and the signal sent to the main output can be recorded internally.

The GO-DJ is remarkable in that the DSP effects can be applied to some extent on the live inputs, meaning that the microphone or line input signal can be scratched, looped, or have effects applied to it.

== History ==
The Monster GO-DJ is notable for being the world's first portable self-contained standalone DJ mixing unit (exception - 2008 Tonium Pacemaker). It was developed over a period of 2 1/2 years and launched in 2012 by Monster in conjunction with JD Sound, a South Korean company that is led by CEO Kim Hee-Chan.

== Reception ==
=== Awards ===
The unit received an iF product design award in 2013. Additionally, it was awarded a gold medal at the Pittsburgh International Exhibition of Inventions and was recognized twice in South Korea in 2012, receiving an award from the Small and Medium Business Administration in February and Good Design designation in September of that year.

=== Reactions ===
The Monster GO-DJ has been likened to the Stanton SCS.4DJ in that both are standalone DJ units. It has been criticized for its small size, which belies its feature set and likens it to a toy or game, and for its lack of dedicated hardware equalization knobs. The three on-screen multi-touch eq faders are reached via a single swipe from the main screen.

== See also ==
- Computer DJ
- DJ mixer
- DJ digital controller
- Monster (company)
- Stanton Magnetics
- Pioneer DJ
