= How's It Goin' Down =

1998 single by DMX

Single by DMX featuring Faith Evans

from the album It's Dark and Hell Is Hot
- B-side: "Ruff Ryders' Anthem"
- Released: June 9, 1998
- Recorded: April 1998
- Genre: East Coast hip-hop
- Length: 4:42
- Label: Ruff Ryders; Def Jam
- Songwriters: Simmons; Anthony Fields
- Producer: P.K.

DMX singles chronology
""Ruff Ryders' Anthem" (1998)	"How's It Goin' Down" (1998)	"Grand Finale" (1998)

Faith Evans singles chronology
"I'll Be Missing You" (1997)	"How's It Goin' Down" (1998)	"Love Like This" (1998)

"How's It Goin' Down" is a song by American rapper DMX, released as the fourth and final single from his first album, It's Dark and Hell Is Hot. The song features vocals by R&B singer Faith Evans and was released to radio on June 9, 1998. The song was a modest hit, peaking at No. 70 on the Billboard Hot 100. It contains a sample of "God Make Me Funky" by the Headhunters from the 1975 album, Survival of the Fittest.

== Music video ==
Directed by Hype Williams, the video was filmed in late July 1998 in Harlem, New York City. The music video provides a visual depiction of the song's story, detailing DMX's affair with the a woman named Tenika (played by video model Liza Rivera) who is already in a relationship with the father of her two children. It features cameos by then-unknown artists Eve, Ja Rule, Drag-On and Irv Gotti, all of whom would rise to prominence in the following year.

== Interpolations and samples ==
Canadian rapper and singer Drake incorporated the lyrics to the chorus of "How's It Goin' Down" in his own song, "U with Me?" from the album Views. American rapper Moneybagg Yo sampled "How's It Goin' Down" in his song "Scorpio". J. Cole also interpolated the lyrics to the chorus on his song "Life Sentence" from his 2026 album The Fall-Off.

== Charts ==
Chart	Position
U.S. Billboard Hot 100	70
U.S. Billboard Hot R&B/Hip-Hop Singles & Tracks	19

== Certifications ==
Region	Certification	Certified units/sales
United States (RIAA)	Gold	500,000^{‡}
^{‡} Sales+streaming figures based on certification alone.
