= Get at Me Dog =

Single by DMX featuring Sheek Louch

from the album It's Dark and Hell Is Hot
- Released: February 10, 1998
- Recorded: December 1997
- Genre: Hardcore hip hop
- Length: 4:03
- Label: Ruff Ryders; Def Jam
- Songwriters: Earl Simmons; D. Dean; S. Taylor; A. Fields; Damon Blackman
- Producers: P.K.; Dame Grease

DMX singles chronology
"Shut 'Em Down" (1998)	"Get at Me Dog" (1998)	"Stop Being Greedy" (1998)

Sheek Louch singles chronology
"Get at Me Dog" (1998)	"Mighty D-Block" (2003)

"Get at Me Dog" is the major-label debut single by American rapper DMX, released on February 10, 1998, through Def Jam Recordings and Ruff Ryders Entertainment. Serving as the lead single for his quadruple-platinum debut studio album, It's Dark and Hell Is Hot, the track features a guest vocal performance from Sheek Louch of The Lox during the chorus. The song was produced by Dame Grease with additional production from P.K.

Commercially, the single became a breakthrough hit, peaking at number 39 on the US Billboard Hot 100 and reaching number 19 on the Hot R&B/Hip-Hop Songs chart. It was subsequently certified Gold by the Recording Industry Association of America (RIAA) for sales exceeding 500,000 units. "Get at Me Dog" is widely cited by music critics as a cultural turning point that single-handedly shifted the landscape of mainstream hip hop away from the polished, pop-oriented "shiny suit" era back toward an aggressive street aesthetic.

== Background and release ==
Following his underground mixtape success, DMX garnered heavy major label attention, with Def Jam Recordings executive Irv Gotti championing his raw street rap style to hesitant label heads. Bad Boy Records founder Sean Combs reportedly passed on signing him due to his aggressive delivery, which freed up Def Jam to secure DMX.

"Get at Me Dog" was officially released on February 10, 1998, serving as DMX's definitive major-label debut single. The track was distributed across CD, cassette, and 12-inch vinyl single formats to simultaneously target mainstream radio playlists and street-level club play.

== Production ==
The song features Sheek Louch of The Lox performing vocal duties during the chorus. The instrumental track was produced by Dame Grease for Vacant Lot Production and Ruff Ryders Entertainment, with additional production by P.K. Built around a prominent loop, the song samples the 1974 track "Everything Good to You (Ain't Always Good for You)" by funk/disco group B.T. Express. Beyond its album release, the track was featured in the 2005 video game Grand Theft Auto: Liberty City Stories, where it appears on the in-game hip hop radio station "The Liberty Jam".

== Critical reception ==
"Get at Me Dog" received widespread acclaim from music critics, who praised it for shifting the sonic landscape of mainstream hip hop away from the polished "shiny suit" era. Writing for Rolling Stone during the song's initial run, journalists highlighted the track's immediate impact, noting that the single established DMX as an underground legend. New York City club and radio programmer Funkmaster Flex strongly championed the song's club appeal, characterizing it as an essential anthem that immediately sent club audiences into a frenzy.

Retrospective analyses have heavily emphasized the track's long-term historical importance to the genre. In a retrospective review, Rolling Stone Australia noted that the track acted as a timely, thugged-out wake-up call that re-established street authenticity as the fundamental essence of hip hop.

== Legacy ==
"Get at Me Dog" is widely recognized by music historians for shifting the late-1990s commercial hip hop landscape away from pop-heavy "shiny suit" musical trends. The track's immediate commercial traction established a lucrative blueprint for both Def Jam Recordings and Ruff Ryders Entertainment.

Its massive early momentum initiated an unprecedented chart run, contributing to DMX becoming the first living rapper to debut two distinct studio albums at number one on the Billboard 200 within the same calendar year.

== Music video ==
The accompanying music video for "Get at Me Dog" was directed by Hype Williams and released in February 1998 to support DMX's major-label debut. The visuals were filmed entirely on location at Peter Gatien's Tunnel nightclub in New York City, where the track had already established itself as an underground club anthem.

== Track listings ==
US 12-inch single

- A1. "Get at Me Dog" (Radio Edit) (featuring Sheek) – 3:06
- A2. "Get at Me Dog" (Instrumental) – 2:51
- A3. "Get at Me Dog Freestyle" (Radio Edit) (featuring The Lox) – 4:08
- B1. "Stop Being Greedy" (Radio Edit) – 3:37
- B2. "Stop Being Greedy" (Street Version) – 3:37

US CD single

- 1. "Get at Me Dog" (Radio Edit) (featuring Sheek) – 3:06
- 2. "Stop Being Greedy" (Radio Edit) – 3:37

== Charts ==
=== Weekly charts ===
Chart (1998)	Peak position
US Billboard Hot 100	39
US Hot R&B/Hip-Hop Songs (Billboard)	19
US Hot Rap Songs (Billboard)	6

== Certifications ==
Region	Certification	Certified units/sales
United States (RIAA)	Gold	500,000^{^}
^{^} Shipments figures based on certification alone.
