= Fatgums =

- Also known as: Gums
- Born: Eric Strand; September 28, 1980 (age 45); San Francisco, California
- Origin: Los Angeles, California
- Genres: Hip Hop, Rap
- Occupations: Record Producer, DJ, Record Label owner, Medical Student
- Instruments: Turntables; Pro Tools; MPC; Keyboard
- Years active: 1993 – present
- Labels: Beatrock Music, GammaGums Music

Eric Strand (born September 28, 1980, in San Francisco, California), better known as Fatgums, is an American record producer, hip hop DJ and independent record label owner/president. He is best known for his work with rapper Bambu of the rap group Native Guns. Fatgums' independent record label, Beatrock Music, was founded in 2009 in collaboration with the Long Beach based clothing company Beatrock.

== Background ==
Fatgums started his music career in 1993 as a DJ/turntablist in the San Francisco Bay Area. In 1999, he moved to Los Angeles to attend college at UCLA. He began his professional hip hop production career after graduating in 2004.

== Recent and current projects ==
In April 2009, Fatgums and Bambu released the critically acclaimed EP, Beatrock Presents: Fatgums x Bambu ...A Peaceful Riot.... The musical chemistry between Fatgums and Bambu has been likened to that of 9th Wonder and Murs. Bookends (produced by Fatgums and Gammaray) by Novelists (Ajax and Randall Park a.k.a. Randruff), was his first full-length production effort.

== Discography ==
Mixtapes

- 2000: OHHSSH!! by Fatgums and Gammaray

Albums

- 2008: Bookends (Produced by Fatgums and Gammaray) by Novelists
- 2008: The Appetizer by The CounterParts
- 2009: Beatrock Presents: Fatgums X Bambu ...A Peaceful Riot... by Fatgums x Bambu
- 2009: The CounterParts LP by The CounterParts
- 2010: Remittances by Power Struggle
- 2010: Gumstrumentals Volume I by Fatgums

Featured Production

- 2005
  - The Committee - "Struggles" (The Committee EP)
- 2008
  - Bambu - "Make Change" (...Exact Change...)
  - Bambu - "Seven Months" (...Exact Change...)
  - Bambu - "Exact Change" (...Exact Change...)
  - Bambu - "Iron Bam" (...Exact Change...)
  - ReVision - "Forward Progress ft. DJ Krissfader" (Forward Progress Mixtape)
  - ReVision - "Daily Grind ft. C-Los" (Forward Progress Mixtape)
- 2009
  - Geologic (of Blue Scholars), Kiwi & Bambu (of Native Guns) - "Divide & Conquer" (A Song For Ourselves Mixtape by DJ Phatrick)
- 2010
  - Rocky Rivera - "The Rundown" (Rocky Rivera)
  - Bambu - "The Queen Is Dead" (...Paper Cuts...)
- 2011
  - Bambu - "Jonah's Lament" (...exact change... Reloaded)
  - Dregs One - "Think About It" (The Wake Up Call Mixtape)
  - Prometheus Brown and Bambu - "Lookin Up" (Prometheus Brown and Bambu Walk Into A Bar)
  - Otayo Dubb - "Jerry McGuire" (Cold Piece of Work)
  - Otayo Dubb - "A Lil' More (feat. Bambu)" (Cold Piece of Work)
- 2012
  - Bwan - "Infinite" (Living Room)
  - Bwan - "Grindstone" (Living Room)
  - Bwan - "Lyricists (feat. Akil)" (Living Room)
- 2013
  - Patience - "City Love" (Broken Hourglass)
  - Bambu - "Sun In A Million" (Sun Of A Gun)
  - Rocky Rivera - "Air Mail" (Gangster of Love)
- 2014
  - Power Struggle - "A Round For My Friends" (In Your Hands)
  - Power Struggle - "Live That Life" (In Your Hands)
  - Power Struggle - "Falling From The Sky" (In Your Hands)
- 2015
  - Rocky Rivera - "Godsteppin" (Nom de Guerre)
  - Rocky Rivera - "Turn You" (Nom de Guerre)
